= Markle House =

Markle House may refer to:

- Dixon–Markle House, Aspen, Colorado
- Markle House and Mill Site, Otter Creek Township, Indiana
- George and Eugene Markle House, Petoskey, Michigan
- Jacob F. Markle Stone House, Rochester, New York
- Markle–Pittock House, Portland, Oregon
