= Shilling–Lamb House =

Historic house in Colorado, United States

- U.S. National Register of Historic Places
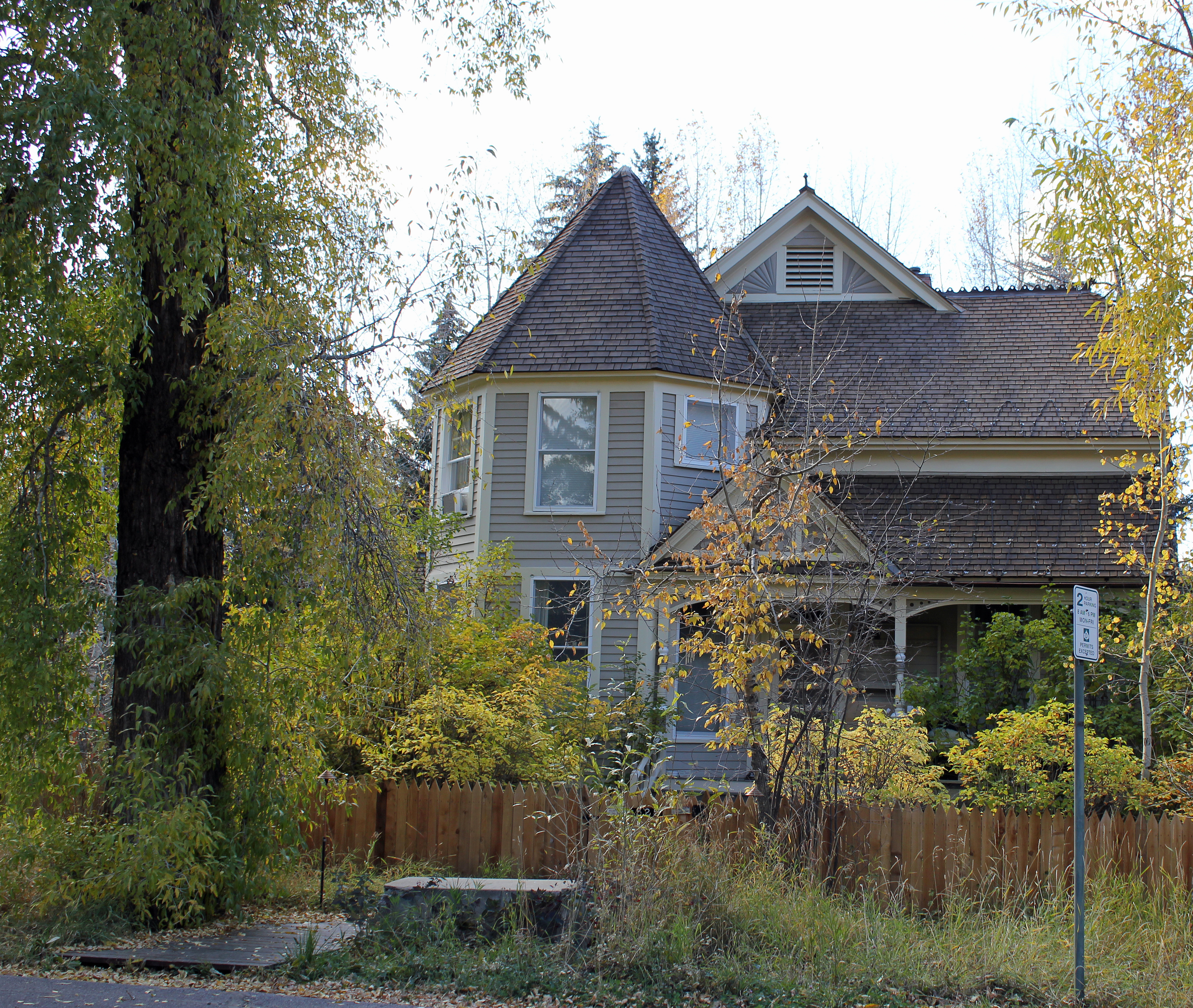
- East elevation, 2011

- Location within Colorado
- Location: Aspen, CO
- Coordinates: 39°11′43″N 106°49′26″W
- Built: 1890
- Architectural style: Queen Anne
- MPS: Historic Resources of Aspen
- NRHP reference No.: 87000163
- Added to NRHP: March 6, 1987

The Shilling–Lamb House, also sometimes referred to as Victoria House, is located on North Second Street in Aspen, Colorado, United States. It is a wood frame structure in the Queen Anne architectural style built around 1890. In 1987 it was listed on the National Register of Historic Places.

It is unique among Aspen's Queen Anne houses both for its minimal decoration and its corner tower. The name comes from its first two occupants. In the later 20th century it was the home of Edgar Stanton, a cofounder of the Aspen Music Festival and School who established its training program for recording engineers. It has remained a private residence, largely intact from the time of its construction.

== Building ==
The house is located on the north fringe of Aspen's residential West End, on the west side of North Second between West Smuggler Street and Lake Avenue. It is surrounded by other houses, most of a more modern construction, but another surviving Victorian residence, the Newberry House, also listed on the Register, is located a block to the east. Tall mature trees provide shade throughout the neighborhood, which has generally level terrain, sloping very slightly to the Roaring Fork River to the north. Across the street a small playground faces the house on an otherwise undeveloped triangular lot.

A plain wooden picket fence sets off the house from the street. It is a two-story wood frame house on a high sandstone foundation. It is mostly sided with clapboard except in the fields of its cross-gabled roofs, which use wood "dog-ear" shingles, common in the city. On the southeast corner is a large octagonal tower with a conical roof. Like the main block its roof is shingled.

North of the tower a porch runs across the east (front) facade at the first story. It has a shed roof supported by wooden piers with decorative woodwork between them, crossed by a gable sheltering the main entrance. An open porch is located along the rear. All windows are one-over-one double-hung sash windows, except for the second story of the northeast facet of the tower, which has a single-pane window. A small louvered vent is in the uppermost cross-gable field.

== History ==
Arthur Shilling built the house around 1890. At the time, Aspen was a booming mining town that had barely been much more than a primitive encampment of tents and log cabins a decade earlier. Fortunes were being made from the abundant silver lodes in the neighboring mountains, and many who had earned them put some of them into building lavish houses for themselves.

Many of those houses were erected in the undeveloped West End, which had long been platted and drawn up with a grid plan for its streets. Shilling, a dry goods store owner, chose a lot near the north side for his home. It was fairly unrestrained in its application of the contemporary Queen Anne style, with nested and cross-gabling creating a complex interplay of forms, and a signature tower attached to the house. That, and its relatively plain facades, distinguished it from some of other surviving Queen Annes in the city, like the Smith–Elisha House on West Main Street (also listed on the National Register) and the Ola Case House on West Francis Street.

Three years later, the Panic of 1893 led Congress to repeal the Sherman Silver Purchase Act, which had sustained Aspen's growth by requiring the government to buy silver to support the dollar. Mines closed, people left Aspen for opportunities elsewhere. This began a long period of the city's history known as the "quiet years", marked by a constantly declining population and economic hardship. Five years later, Albert Lamb, who had come from Leadville in 1887 and established a successful drugstore, bought Shilling's house.

During the quiet years, many of the buildings from the city's prosperous beginnings fell vacant, often becoming the property of Pitkin County due to tax foreclosures. With no money available to maintain them, they succumbed to either fires or the effects of the severe Rocky Mountain winters at almost 8,000 feet (2,400 m) above sea level.

At some point during this time, the house was modified slightly. Some of the windows were expanded. Finials were removed from the tower and roof. The rear porch, original covered by a gabled roof supported by turned wooden columns, was extended and its roof removed.

The quiet years came to an end just before the middle of the 20th century, after World War II. Skiing enthusiasts had begun developing trails on the nearby mountains in the late 1930s, and returned to continue their work a decade later. The new Aspen Skiing Company received a boost from investments by Walter Paepcke, a Chicago executive who, along with his wife Elizabeth, saw in Aspen the perfect place to establish a classical music festival in the U.S. to rival Salzburg.

The Paepckes bought most of the old houses and commercial properties in Aspen with the intent of restoring them. Among their purchases was the Shilling—Lamb house. They in turn sold it to Francis and Edgar Stanton and their wives in 1950. The Stantons had been taken with Aspen four years earlier and were spending more time there, eventually becoming full-time residents.

Along with the Paepckes, Edgar Stanton was a founding board member of the Aspen Music Festival and School. He had worked in audio engineering during the war, and established the Edgar Stanton Audio Recording Institute in the early 1950s to complement the music festival and train engineers. He soon developed new property of his own on the mountains across the Roaring Fork, and sold his share of the house to his brother and sister-in-law. Francis Stanton sold it in 1958, also to move to house on the slopes of Red Mountain.

== See also ==
- National Register of Historic Places in Pitkin County, Colorado
