= Smith–Elisha House =

Historic house in Colorado, United States

- U.S. National Register of Historic Places
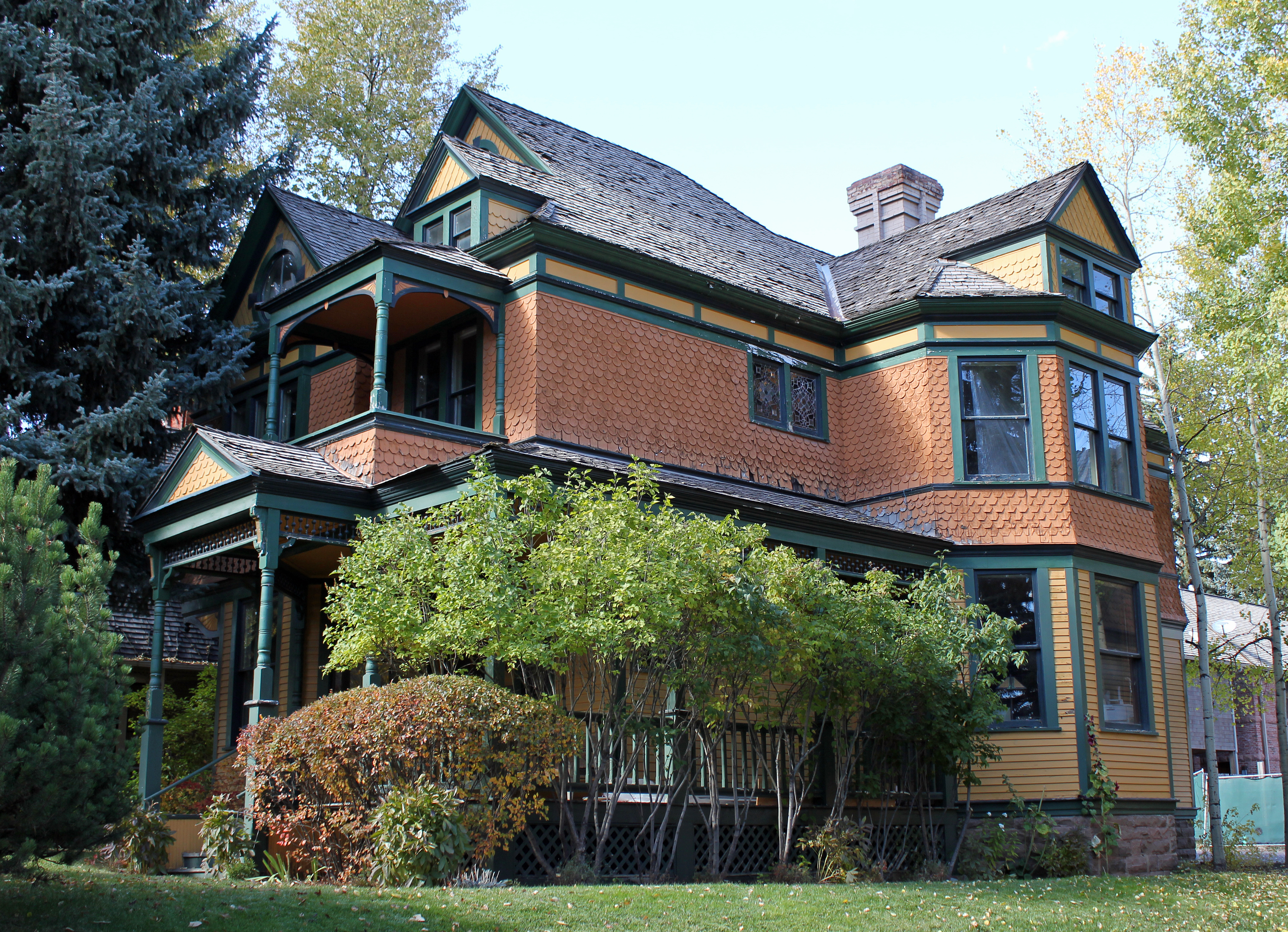
- South elevation and east profile, 2011

- Location within Colorado
- Location: Aspen, CO
- Coordinates: 39°11′32″N 106°49′32″W
- Built: ca. 1890
- Architectural style: Queen Anne
- MPS: Historic Resources of Aspen
- NRHP reference No.: 87002121
- Added to NRHP: January 19, 1989

The Smith–Elisha House, sometimes known just as the Elisha House or the Christmas Tree House, is located on West Main Street (State Highway 82) in Aspen, Colorado, United States. It is a wood frame structure in the Queen Anne style built in the late 19th century. In 1989 it was listed on the National Register of Historic Places.

It is considered one of the best Queen Anne houses in the city. Eben Smith, its original owner, was a mine owner during Aspen's boomtown years who worked to improve mine safety. Mansor Elisha, its other titular owner, was an accidental owner of the Hotel Jerome who later became mayor. Since those times it has remained intact.

== Buildings and grounds ==
The house is located on the north side of West Main, between North Second and North Third streets. The neighborhood, two blocks west of downtown Aspen, is primarily residential, with multiple-unit dwellings of more modern construction giving way to the older single-family houses of the city's West End. Terrain is level, midway between the slopes of Aspen Mountain to the south and the Roaring Fork River to the north. There is, in addition to the house, a barn and carriage house in the rear with a cupola on its cross-gabled roof. The barn is considered a contributing resource to the Register listing.

A block to the north is the D.E. Frantz House, also listed on the Register. The Matthew Callahan Log Cabin, one of the few original such structures left in Aspen, is a block away on South Third Street, and Pioneer Park is to the northwest at the same distance. Both, too, are listed.

The main house is a two-and-a-half-story wood frame structure on a stone foundation. It is irregular in plan and topped by several steeply pitched shingled gables, with a tall decorative chimney piercing the rear roof. The first story is sided in clapboard while the upper stories are done in shingles.

A shed-roofed porch wraps around the southeast corner, where the main entrance is located, ending at a large projecting bay on the east facade. It is supported by turned posts with latticework between them at the upper ends and a simple balustrade at the deck. In front of it the steps are sheltered by a gabled hood with a shingled pediment supported by similar posts. A decorative wooden railing runs up them.

At the second story the shingled section flares outward slightly at the bottom. Above the main entrance is a hip roofed balcony also supported by decorative wooden posts. It is topped by a small gabled dormer window on the attic level. Another dormer tops the projecting bay.

External image
- Mid-20th century view of house from different angle

Most windows on the house are one-over-one double-hung sash with plain wooden surrounds. In the dormers, and on the east facet of the projecting bay, the windows are paired. A large oculus with crossed muntins and keystones is in the western gable apex on the south (front) facade, above a triple window. Two paired casement windows with decorative patterned glass are on the second story just south of the projecting bay, the only windows on that side of the second story.

== History ==
In the late 1880s, Aspen was booming. Its mines produced silver in quantity, selling primarily to the U.S. government, required by the Sherman Silver Purchase Act to buy the metal to support the dollar. What had a decade earlier started as a primitive encampment of tents and log cabins was now a bustling settlement of almost 10,000 with luxury hotels and other amenities. Those who had grown rich from the boom built large houses for themselves in the city's West End.

Eben Smith was one. His mines in Aspen were among many he owned or co-owned in the state, and he did a lot to improve safety in the industry. Around 1890 he erected the house in the then-popular Queen Anne style. Two years later he left the city.

The Panic of 1893 ended the city's early growth. Congress repealed the Sherman Act to combat inflation. With the market no longer so sustained, the price of silver dropped and many mines became unprofitable and closed. Miners then went to work elsewhere. The houses that had been built fell vacant as the city entered a period now known as its "quiet years" when its population dwindled to ultimately less than a thousand by 1930.

During this period, Mansor Elisha, a Lebanese immigrant, came to Aspen. He managed to thrive despite the economy, and in 1911 became the owner of the Hotel Jerome, the only hotel in the city left from the early years. He did well enough that he was able to buy Smith's house for his family, preserving it from the neglect which led many other old buildings from the 1880s in the city to burn or collapse.

Elisha and his descendants owned or operated the Jerome for the next 50 years. During the latter half of that time, prosperity gradually began to return to Aspen as it developed into a ski resort and popular retreat for celebrities and corporate executives. The Aspen Skiing Company leased the hotel and let Laurence Elisha, Mansor's son, manage it until his death in 1968.

His widow Svea sold the hotel but kept the house until her own death in the mid-1980s. At that time, her estate objected to its listing on the Register along with other properties in the city's multiple property submission, and it was not listed until 1989. The following year it won an award from Colorado Preservation for excellence in the adaptive reuse of a residential structure. It was remodeled and has been used as offices for several businesses since then.

== See also ==
- National Register of Historic Places in Pitkin County, Colorado
