= Samuel I. Hallett House =

Historic house in Colorado, United States

- U.S. National Register of Historic Places
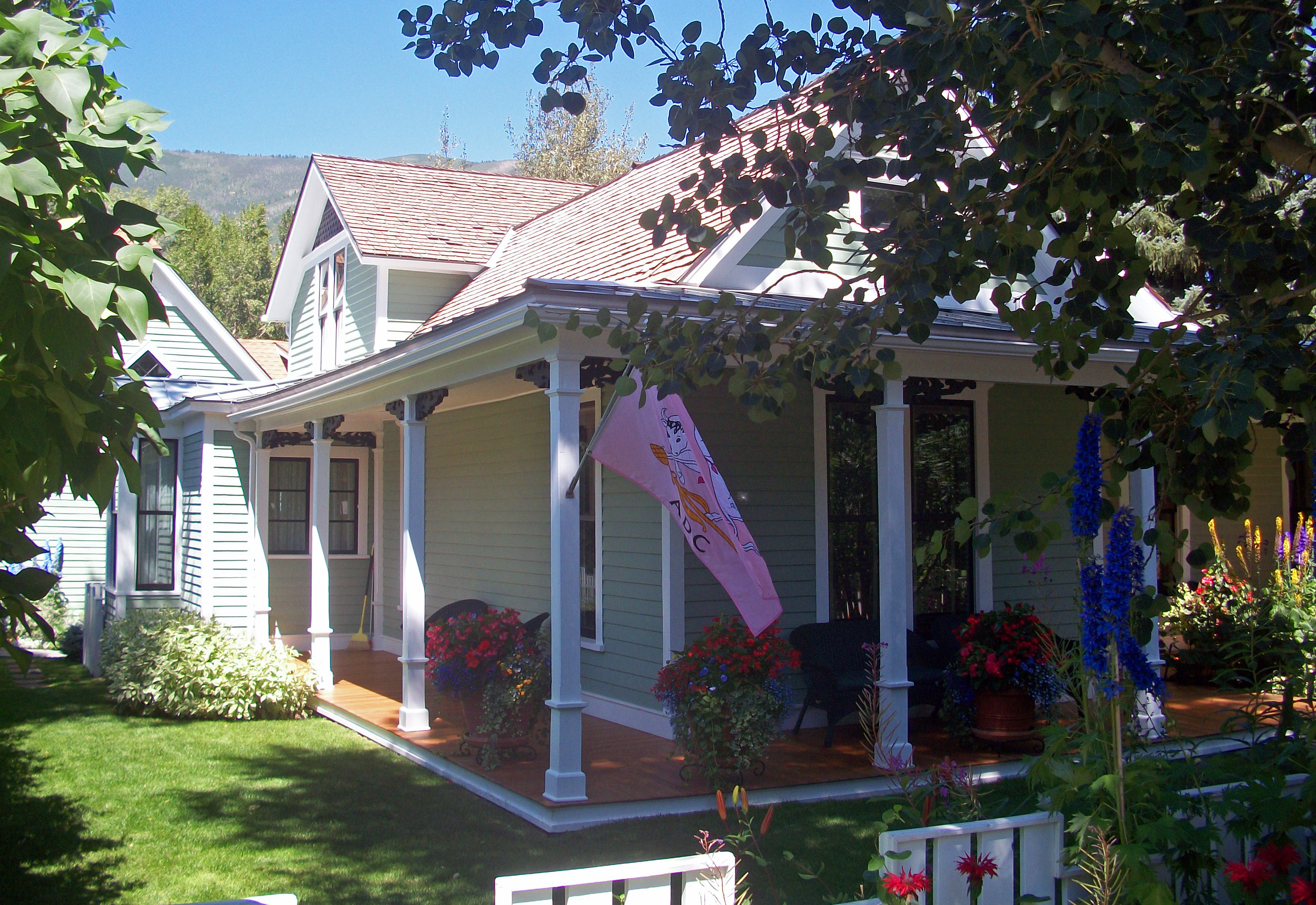
- South elevation and west profile, 2010

- Location within Colorado
- Location: Aspen, CO
- Coordinates: 39°11′41″N 106°49′35″W
- Built: 1885
- Architectural style: Victorian
- MPS: Historic Resources of Aspen
- NRHP reference No.: 87000155
- Added to NRHP: March 6, 1987

The Samuel I. Hallett House is located on West Francis Avenue in Aspen, Colorado, United States. It is a timber frame structure built in the late 19th century. In 1987 it was listed on the National Register of Historic Places.

It was originally a log cabin built by one of the miners who came to Aspen in its earliest years of settlement, during the Colorado Silver Boom. Samuel I. Hallett, who later expanded it, was an officer of the Smuggler Mine, one of Aspen's largest and most lucrative. When its owners renovated it in the mid-20th century, they discovered the remnants of the original log cabin. Since then it has been through multiple owners, and remains a private residence.

== Building ==
The house is located at the northeast corner of West Francis and North Fourth streets in Aspen's residential West End. All the neighboring properties are houses, generally of a more modern construction. Many are surrounded by mature trees. The land is generally level, midway between the slopes of Aspen Mountain to the south and the Roaring Fork River to the north.

A stone mounting block with the name "Hallett" on it is located at the street. The building itself occupies a narrow lot ending at the alley in the middle of the block. It has a one-and-a-half-story L-shaped front-gabled main block, sided in clapboard and topped with a shingled roof. A short cross-gabled section projects from the east side, with a longer cross-gable at the northwest corner. North of the house is a rear outbuilding, in a style similar to the main house.

On the three sides of the main block is a wraparound porch. It has a shed roof supported by square wooden pillars that rise from the tiled deck. Fenestration on the first floor consists of narrow casement and one-over-oine double-hung sash windows. Fish-scale shingles side the gable apexes.

== History ==
Aspen was incorporated as a city in 1879, when it was just a few tents and log cabins. By 1885 the Colorado Silver Boom was underway, and the city was growing rapidly. It is believed that a man named Thomas Anson built the original log cabin that year although some sources date the original construction to 1888, three years later.

Two years later the cabin was purchased by Samuel I. Hallett and his wife. He had just arrived in Aspen from the Black Hills of South Dakota, and found his mining experience there in high demand in his new home. Soon he became superintendent of the Smuggler Mine northeast of the city, and secretary of several other major mines. In 1892 the Halletts decided to remodel the old log cabin into a house more befitting someone of his stature in town. Clapboard siding, similar to that seen on most of Aspen's larger house, went up over the logs.

The city's prosperity abruptly ended the next year when Congress repealed the Sherman Silver Purchase Act in response to the Panic of 1893. The silver market contracted, mines closed and miners left for more promising opportunities elsewhere. Nonetheless, the house remained in the Hallett family until 1935.

It is not known whether any work was done during the city's "quiet years" of the early 20th century. The next known renovation after Hallett's took place in the late 1940s, when new owners acquired the property. They removed the walls and found the original logs beneath. A cast bronze fireplace with bas-relief designs in the downstairs bedroom is the only other remnant of the original house.

City records show that a bed and bath were added in 1953, and the one-story frame bathroom wing in 1960. The front porch and roof were repaired seven years later. There have been no other significant changes to the house.

== See also ==
- National Register of Historic Places listings in Pitkin County, Colorado
