= Ute Cemetery =

Cemetery in Aspen, Colorado, United States

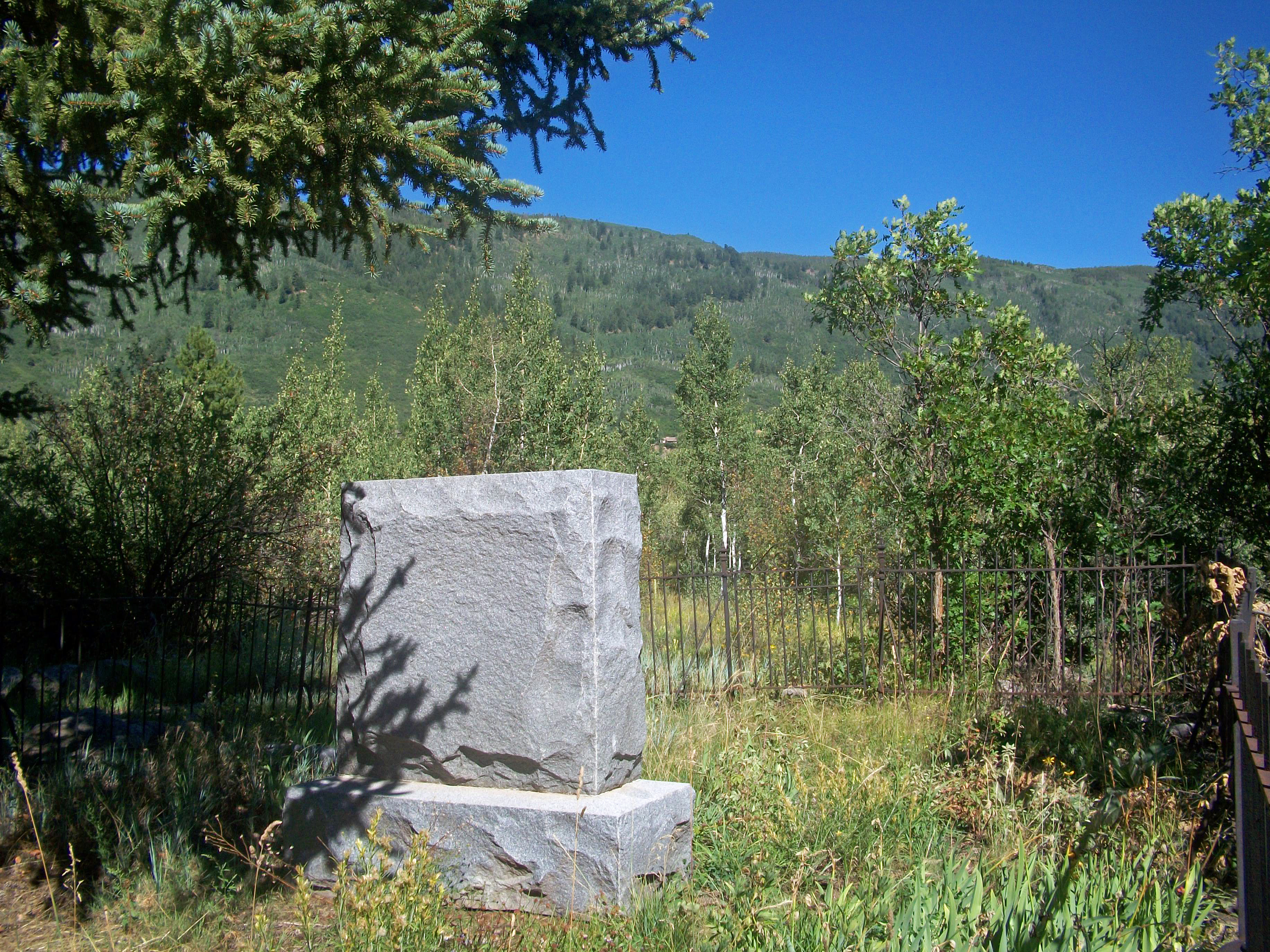
- Monument in cemetery, 2010
- Interactive map of Ute Cemetery

Details
- Established: 1880
- Location: Aspen, CO
- Country: US
- Coordinates: 39°10′55″N 106°48′44″W
- Type: Public
- Owned by: City of Aspen
- Size: 4.7 acres (1.9 ha)
- No. of graves: 200
- Find a Grave: Ute Cemetery

Ute Cemetery, known as Evergreen Cemetery in the 19th century, is located on Ute Avenue in Aspen, Colorado, United States. It is a small, overgrown parcel with approximately 200 burials. In 2002 it was listed on the National Register of Historic Places.

The cemetery was established early in Aspen's history, when a visiting prospector died upon arrival from Texas. There were no formal burial grounds in the new settlement, not even yet incorporated as a city, and the land later used for the current cemetery was used for this first death in the new community. Later, even as two more formal cemeteries were established elsewhere in the city, it continued to be the burial ground for the city's poorer citizens, including some Civil War veterans, until the Great Depression in the 1930s.

After its last burials it fell unmaintained and overgrown, even as skiing and other resort industries revived Aspen's economy in the late 20th century. Trees grew amid many graves. A renovation in the early 21st century, following the listing on the Register, took account of the total graves and restored the many footpaths through the cemetery, popular with local hikers and mountain bikers, but left the wooded nature of the cemetery undisturbed. It is one of the few historic cemeteries in Colorado to have been completely restored.

== Grounds ==
The cemetery occupies an irregularly hexagonal 4.7-acre (1.9 ha) parcel on the north side of Ute Avenue just east of Ute Place in southeastern Aspen. A paved bike path runs between it and Ute. To the east, where the bike path turns to divide the two, is the city's small Ute Park. The Roaring Fork River is to the northeast and the residences of Ute Place to the northwest. Across Ute Avenue to the south are more residences.

Within the cemetery grounds the land is gently rolling, cresting in the west central area and at the southern corners, where the slopes of Aspen Mountain rise across the street. On the northeast the land drops toward the river. The terrain is overgrown with many native species, including not only aspens but gambel oak, serviceberry and sagebrush, and some evergreen species.

On all but the Ute Place side the cemetery's boundaries are marked by a wooden split-rail fence, with openings for some of the trails. At the main entrance, midway along the south bound, is a sandstone tablet with the names of the Civil War veterans buried within. Curving narrow paths, most of them having evolved through use rather than any formal construction, allow passage through the cemetery. A 12-by-20-foot (3.7 by 6.1 m) brick foundation, in very bad shape, at the northwest corner is the only remnant of what was possibly a caretaker's shed.

Approximately 175 graves have been identified at the cemetery, of which 125 are in the western half, in an apparently random pattern. In contrast, the 50 graves to the east are primarily Civil War veterans, buried in two long rows with government-issued markers, the only aspect of the cemetery indicating any planning. Among the other graves, only 25 have markers identifying the deceased. Some are surrounded by iron fences or stone walls, while others are indicated by small cobblestone coping or are just depressions in the ground.

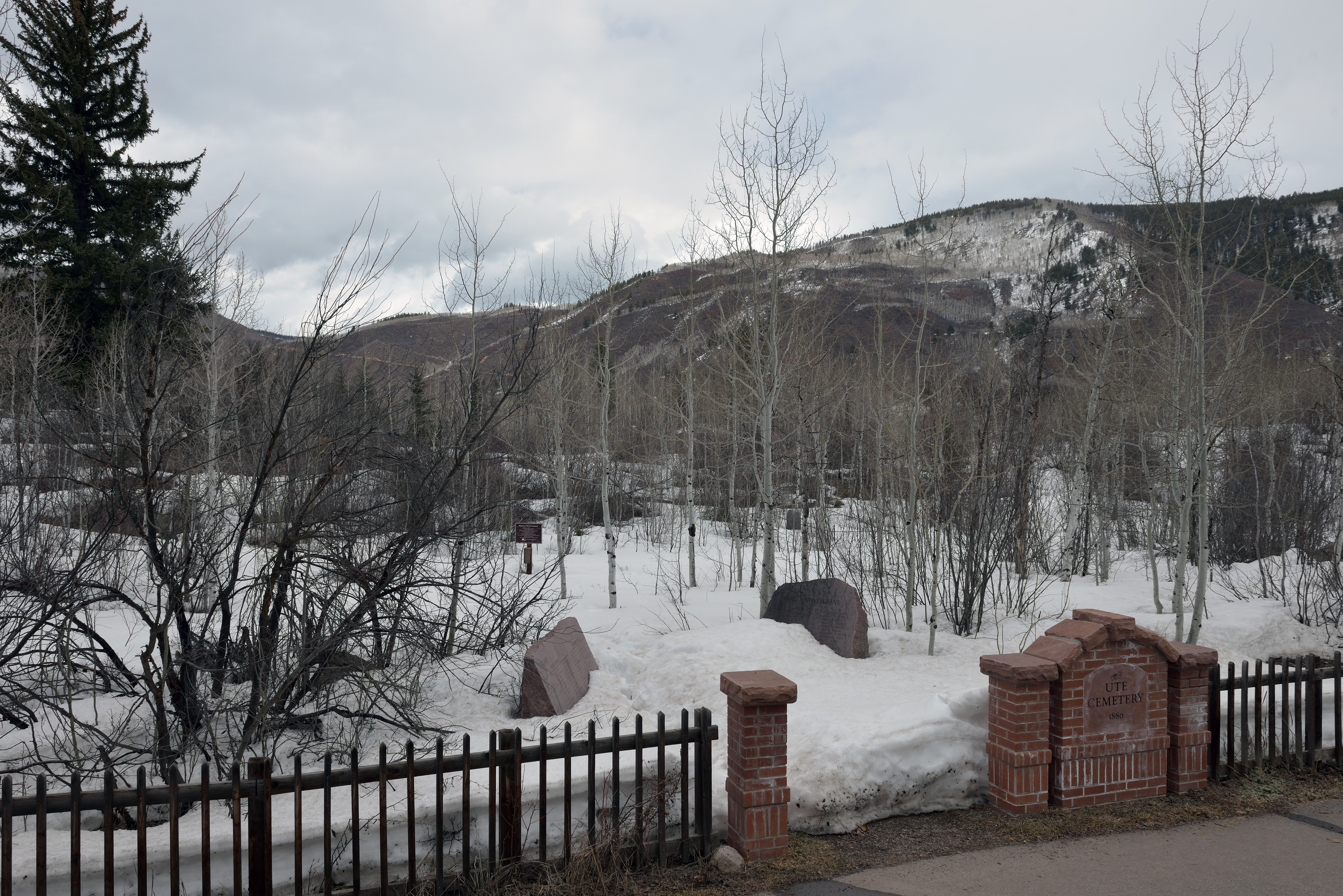
The cemetery in winter

== History ==
In the late 1870s, shortly after Colorado became a state, prospectors began crossing the Continental Divide at Independence Pass in search of silver deposits in the Roaring Fork Valley. Many set up their tents about ten miles (16 km) below the pass at the confluence of the Roaring Fork and its tributary Castle Creek, the first area they found suitable for large-scale settlement. It was called Ute City at first for the dominant local Native American tribe.

A party of prospectors came to the new settlement in 1880 from Texas. One of them, known as Colonel Kirby, had taken ill with "mountain fever" (today known as brucellosis) on the trail near Red Mountain, and died shortly after reaching the party's destination. None of the few inhabitants of the growing community had yet died, so the site of the current cemetery was chosen for the burial, land then owned by Charles Hallam, owner of the Smuggler Mine.

Kirby's body was exhumed the following year to be taken back to Texas and reburied in his family plot. In the meantime the settlement had continued to grow and taken the name Aspen from the abundance of that tree. Town officials realized that they would need a formal burying ground as it grew. They wanted to find a more outlying location than the land Kirby had been buried in, but never did. Burials thus continued on the site, known then as Evergreen Cemetery, without any management, maintenance or oversight from the city. Early wooden or stone markers often fell victim to the severe mountain winters at the cemetery's 8,000-foot (2,400 m)

Many of the early burials were miners killed in accidents or victims of avalanches in wintertime. Undertakers set up shop in the city, taking some of their dead into Ute on a road, no longer extant, that entered the northern edge of the cemetery. They did enough business that many were some of the first in Aspen to list their telephone numbers in advertisements. Those unable to afford one often performed their own services in the cemetery and erected their own monuments.

The city's annual Decoration Day (now Memorial Day) ceremonies were held at the cemetery. This led to some occasional efforts to maintain the cemetery, most significantly in 1886. By 1888 two competing railroad lines had reached Aspen, giving mourners access to the kind of cut stone that could make fancier grave markers. The following year Aspen Grove Cemetery opened on the slopes below Smuggler Mountain. It was perhaps harder to reach but offered a more planned, rural cemetery atmosphere with planted aspens in rows and a carriage access road with turnaround and became the burial ground preferred by middle-class and wealthy citizens. The less affluent, and miners with no local family, continued to be buried in Ute.

In 1890, one of the trains brought 15 government-issue markers meant for the veterans' graves at Ute. The local Grand Army of the Republic veterans' organization began cleaning up the area where those graves currently are with the intention, never realized, of arranging them around a monument. The two rows, an arrangement which suggests an infantry formation, were completed with later veterans who died in Aspen. All of the Civil War veterans buried are from the Union, although there are reportedly two Confederate veterans in the unmarked graves.

In its first decade, Aspen had grown from a primitive collection of tents and log cabins to city of more than 10,000, with a luxury hotel and opera house. That growth and prosperity came to an abrupt end in 1893. In response to that year's economic crisis, Congress repealed the Sherman Silver Purchase Act, which had up to then insured the federal government was a steady buyer of much of Aspen's silver. The private market was much smaller, and many of the miners and other businessmen who had come to the city left to try their luck elsewhere in the years afterward. Potato farming and ranching helped sustain Aspen through the beginning of the period known as the city's "quiet years".

Residents did not stop dying, and in 1900 Aspen Grove got competition from the elaborate Red Butte Cemetery, on the western edge of the city. It was even more modern, with driving paths and irrigated gardens, and many of the dead buried at Aspen Grove were moved there. Around this time, Evergreen Cemetery seems to have started being called Ute Cemetery. It is not known whether this was from the street at the cemetery's rear, the nearby spring of that name, or the city's original name. The advent of Red Butte led to discussions about replacing Ute with two new cemeteries, but these never came to pass.

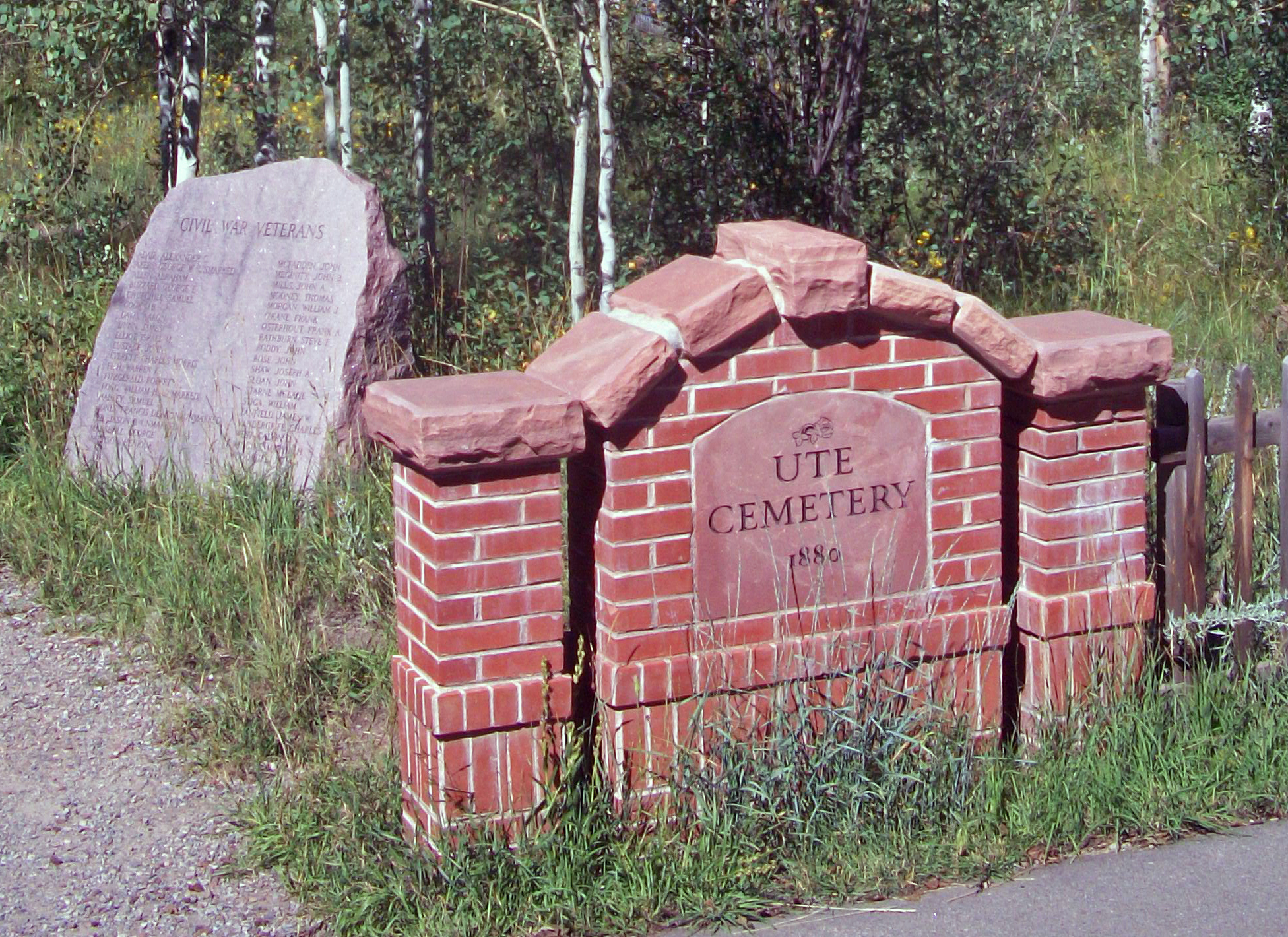
Main entrance built in 2003

City records show that 13 people were buried in Ute during the 1920s, many of them older residents who were indigent at the time of their deaths and could not afford markers. Aspen's population continued to decline to fewer than a thousand by the Depression, and only one burial was recorded during that time. That was in 1935, just before skiing enthusiasts discovered the almost deserted town and the slopes of Aspen Mountain, ideal for their rapidly growing sport.

Even as Aspen began growing again in the later 20th century, only two more burials took place at Ute. The new generation of residents left the cemetery untended, and as the few relatives of its dead who remained died themselves or moved elsewhere the cemetery became overgrown. Vandals destroyed some of the headstones, or sold them to shops downtown.

Late in the century, affluent newer residents took an interest in historic preservation. Some lobbied the city to restore the cemetery, and its listing on the Register began a two-year process paid for by the city and a grant from History Colorado. Volunteers cleaned the cemetery, trimmed growth around the gravesites and improved the walking trails. The new monuments at the entrance on Ute Avenue were installed, and professional stoneworkers restored the carved stones monuments. It is one of the few historic cemeteries in Colorado to have been so thoroughly restored.

== See also ==
- National Register of Historic Places in Pitkin County, Colorado
