= La Fave Block =

- U.S. National Register of Historic Places
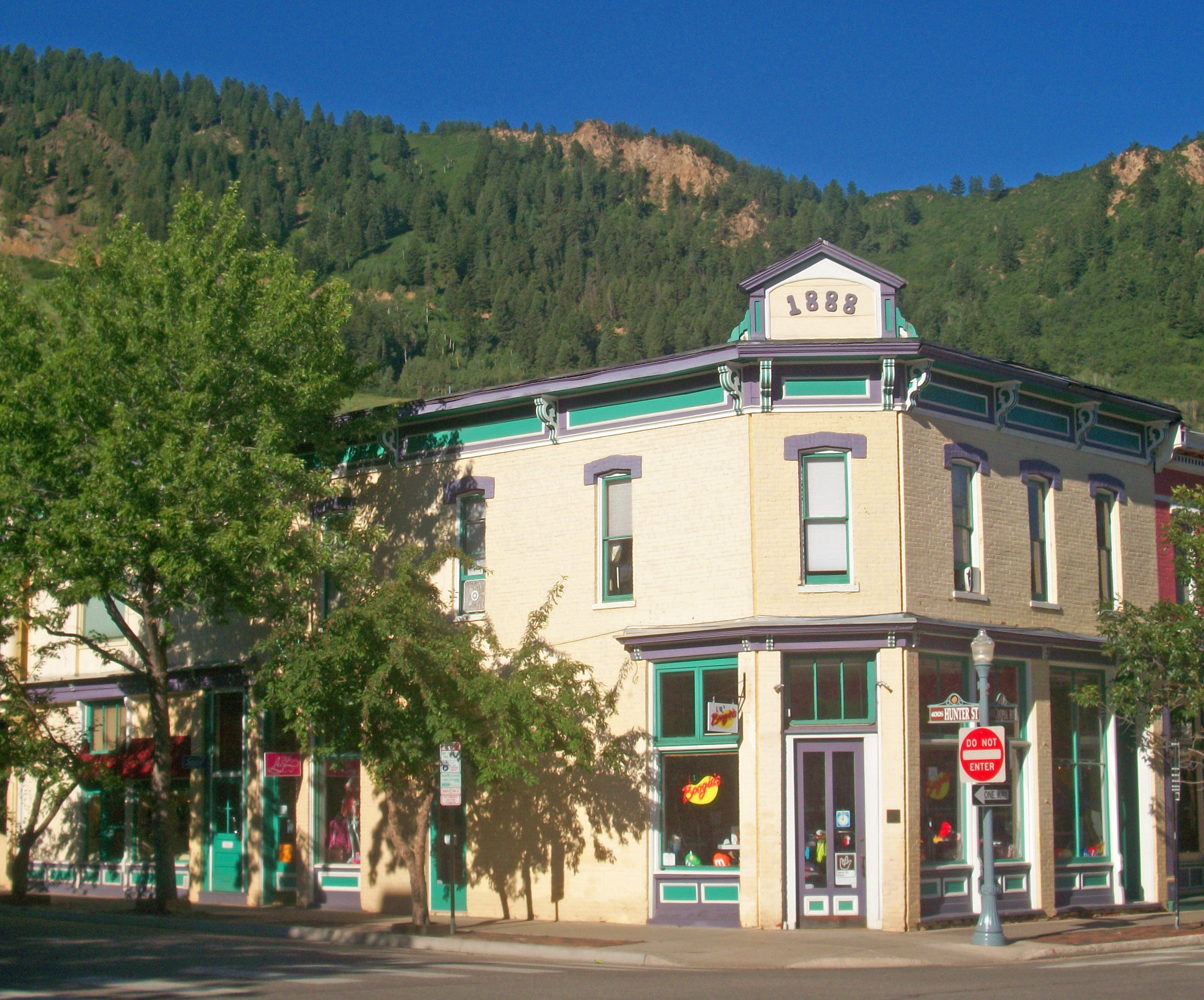
- West and north elevations, 2010

- Location within Colorado
- Location: Aspen, CO
- Coordinates: 39°11′15″N 106°49′3″W
- Built: 1888
- Architectural style: Late Victorian
- MPS: Historic Resources of Aspen MRA
- NRHP reference No.: 87000193
- Added to NRHP: March 6, 1987

The La Fave Block is located at the intersection of East Cooper Avenue and South Hunter Street in Aspen, Colorado, United States. It is a brick commercial building erected in the late 1880s, during the initial mining boom that created Aspen. Today it is the second oldest brick commercial building in the city, and, along with its neighbors on East Cooper, the only structure left built by Frank LaFave, one of Aspen's early settlers. It was listed on the National Register of Historic Places in 1987.

Its ornate Victorian architecture and idiosyncratic fenestration has survived, and it has become one of the most valuable commercial properties in contemporary Aspen due to its location a short distance from the Aspen Mountain ski resort's main lifts. At one point in the 20th century it was the office of an important local architect; and later a ski shop run by Olympic gold medalist Stein Eriksen. Its primary tenant is a clothing store run by Leonard "Boogie" Weinglass, the man said to have inspired a character portrayed by Mickey Rourke. In 2008 it sold for $14.6 million.

== Building ==
The La Fave Block is located on the intersection's southwest corner. Its official address is 405 S. Hunter. It is in the developed area of downtown Aspen a block north of the gondola's bottom terminal across East Durant Avenue and a block west of the pedestrian mall along East Cooper between South Mill and South Galena streets. An alley connects South Galena and South Hunter just south of the block.

The land is level, with the slopes of Aspen Mountain beginning just south of the gondola station. The surrounding neighborhood is heavily developed. On the corners to the north and northeast are modern commercial buildings, also of brick, housing restaurants. Across South Hunter is the Aspen Square Hotel, a modern brick four-story condominium hotel complex. To the east are two other late 19th-century brick buildings. Mature trees, one of them taller than the building have been planted along the sidewalk to provide shade.

The building itself is a two-story structure of brick painted light yellow topped by a wide bracketed wooden molded cornice painted green and purple. The north and west facades, along the streets, are joined by an oblique section with the main entrance. Above it a small pediment with "1888", the year of the building's construction, set in large letters in its entablature.

At three bays, the northern facade is the shorter of the two. The first story windows are irregular save for their large transoms and the dual recessed panels underneath. On the north, The two eastern windows, separated by a mullion, have a large single pane with double-pane transoms. To their west is a large four-pane window without transom. The main entrance, at the corner, has two tall narrow windows over small square panels and a three-pane transom. To its south is a window exactly like the other flanking window. The entire storefront is topped by a small metal-roofed cornice with brackets echoing those at the roofline.

South of the storefront, the west facade is blank for several bays until a small recessed wooden door provides access from the street to the upper floor. Just to its south is another storefront, beginning with a window like those on either side of the main entrance to the corner store save for a single long panel below. On its south is a more deeply recessed two-pane window with transom, then that storefront's main entrance: a wooden door with a four-pane window above three horizontal recessed panels, topped by a single-pane transom. The next two bays have an awning and a blind transom, followed by two narrow windows, one two panes and the other single, an awning and a three-pane transom and finally a blind bay with two panels below. A cornice similar to the main storefront's caps this one.

The upper story's windows are mostly one-over-one double-hung sash with brickwork sills and lintels. The two southernmost on the western facade are less decorative, recessed single-pane windows with plain surrounds between brick pilasters. Above them is a paneled frieze below the cornice. The south facade has a balcony at the second level; the rear is faced in clapboard.

== History ==
Established as a silver mining camp in 1879, Aspen quickly became a boomtown as settlers flocked to the upper Roaring Fork Valley. Many of the early permanent structures were timber frame buildings that were vulnerable to the frequent fires that broke out in the growing town. The city's government began requiring in the mid-1880s that new commercial buildings downtown be built of brick, stone or other fireproof materials.

Frank LaFave, an early settler, built the block that bears his name in 1888. He had wanted to build a larger building, but the owner of the wooden structure next door would not sell (before La Fave completed his building, however, it burned down). It was originally a restaurant, with apartments for rent upstairs.

That restaurant, the St. James, was praised by The Aspen Daily Times as "magnificent, neat, and clean." In the years after the Colorado Silver Boom ended and Aspen's population declined from over 10,000 to a few hundred by the late 1920s, the block was neglected but did not fall victim to arson or collapse as so many other buildings from the boom era did. In the 1950s, the slow revival of Aspen as a ski town led to the building's revival. Architect Fritz Benedict, influential in the development of the reborn city, used the dilapidated building as his office and rented out the apartments. Two decades later, Norwegian Stein Eriksen, a 1952 Olympic gold medalist in downhill skiing, used the restaurant space as a ski shop.

Eriksen left the property in the 1980s, by which time Aspen had become an upscale destination resort. The storefront is currently used by a clothing boutique run by Leonard "Boogie" Weinglass, often described as the inspiration for Mickey Rourke's character in Barry Levinson's film Diner, who runs Boogie's Diner across the street. Another boutique is in the other storefront; offices are upstairs. In 2008 two local lawyers bought the La Fave Block from Eriksen's partnership for $14.6 million, adding to an extensive portfolio of high-profile downtown properties.

== See also ==
- National Register of Historic Places listings in Pitkin County, Colorado
