= Riede's City Bakery =

- U.S. National Register of Historic Places
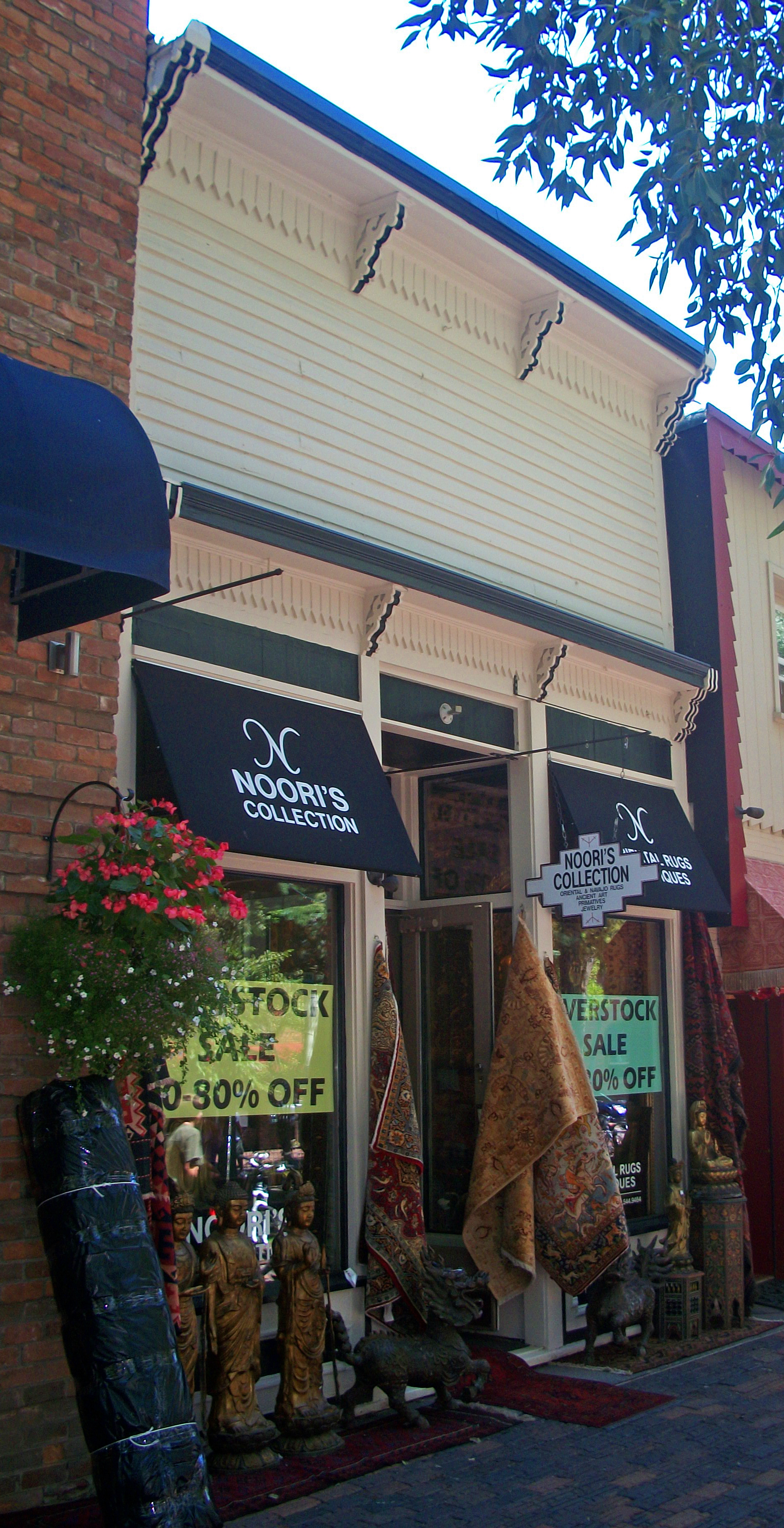
- North elevation, 2010

- Location within Colorado
- Location: Aspen, CO
- Coordinates: 39°11′19″N 106°49′9″W
- Built: 1885
- MPS: Historic Resources of Aspen
- NRHP reference No.: 87000182
- Added to NRHP: March 6, 1987

The former Riede's City Bakery building is located on East Hyman Street in Aspen, Colorado, United States. It is a small wooden commercial building erected in the 1880s. In 1987, it was listed on the National Register of Historic Places.

It is one of only two remaining wood frame commercial buildings from the early years of Aspen's development as a silver mining boomtown. It was not originally a bakery, but became known for one that was operated in the building for almost 20 years. Today it is home to a boutique that sells artwork and hand-woven rugs.

== Building ==
Riede's is located on the south side of East Hyman, near its junction with South Mill Street and the Wheeler Opera House, also listed on the Register. That block of East Hyman has been converted into a pedestrian mall, with commercial buildings on either side of the street in attached rows and tall trees and an unnamed tributary of the Roaring Fork in the middle of cobblestone pavement. The terrain is level, with Wagner Park to the west and the slopes of Aspen Mountain and its ski area several blocks to the south. To the south is one of the alleys connecting Aspen's streets.

The building itself is a two-story wood frame structure with a false front on the northern (front) elevation. A glass storefront with recessed double-door entry is located at street level. Above it is a small wooden bracketed cornice setting off an area with clapboard siding topped by another, similar cornice at the roofline.

Inside the building is mostly given over to retail space with high ceilings. The second story is not used for commercial purposes. It has 1,628 square feet (151.2 m^{2}) of space.

== History ==
The building was constructed in 1885; its original use is not known although it may have been a bakery. At that time Aspen, which had not even existed a decade earlier, was growing rapidly due to the Colorado Silver Boom. New buildings were erected regularly. Many were wooden. In the late 1880s, after the city experienced a few devastating fires, including the destruction of the large Clarendon Hotel, an ordinance was passed mandating that all new commercial construction be of brick or stone.

In 1890 Raymond Riede bought the building and opened his bakery and confectionery there. Three years later the repeal of the Sherman Silver Purchase Act during the Panic of 1893 drastically reduced the demand for silver since the federal government was no longer a buyer. Aspen's population began declining as it entered a period since known as "the quiet years".

Riede continued to operate his business until 1908. As the city's population continued to decline, many of its buildings from the boom years became vacant and neglected. They fell victim to fire or the effects of the severe winters at nearly 8,000 feet (2,400 m) of elevation in the mountains. The bakery building, still referred to by the name of its onetime owner, remained. It was a second-hand shop during the Great Depression.

New owners from Denver bought the building in 1946, and renovated it. During the installation of water and sewer lines, they found remnants of the original outdoor brick ovens. When the work was complete, the building reopened as Louie's Spirit House, Aspen's first licensed liquor store.

Louie's remained in business until 1973, after which it became Uncle Willy's Spirit House and then a women's clothing store. In 1985 its exterior was restored to its original appearance by a local architect. Today it houses Noori's Collection, a boutique selling handmade Persian carpets and Native American and Asian art. It has been valued at $3.3 million due to its location in downtown Aspen.

== See also ==
- National Register of Historic Places listings in Pitkin County, Colorado
