= D. E. Frantz House =

Historic house in Colorado, United States

- U.S. National Register of Historic Places
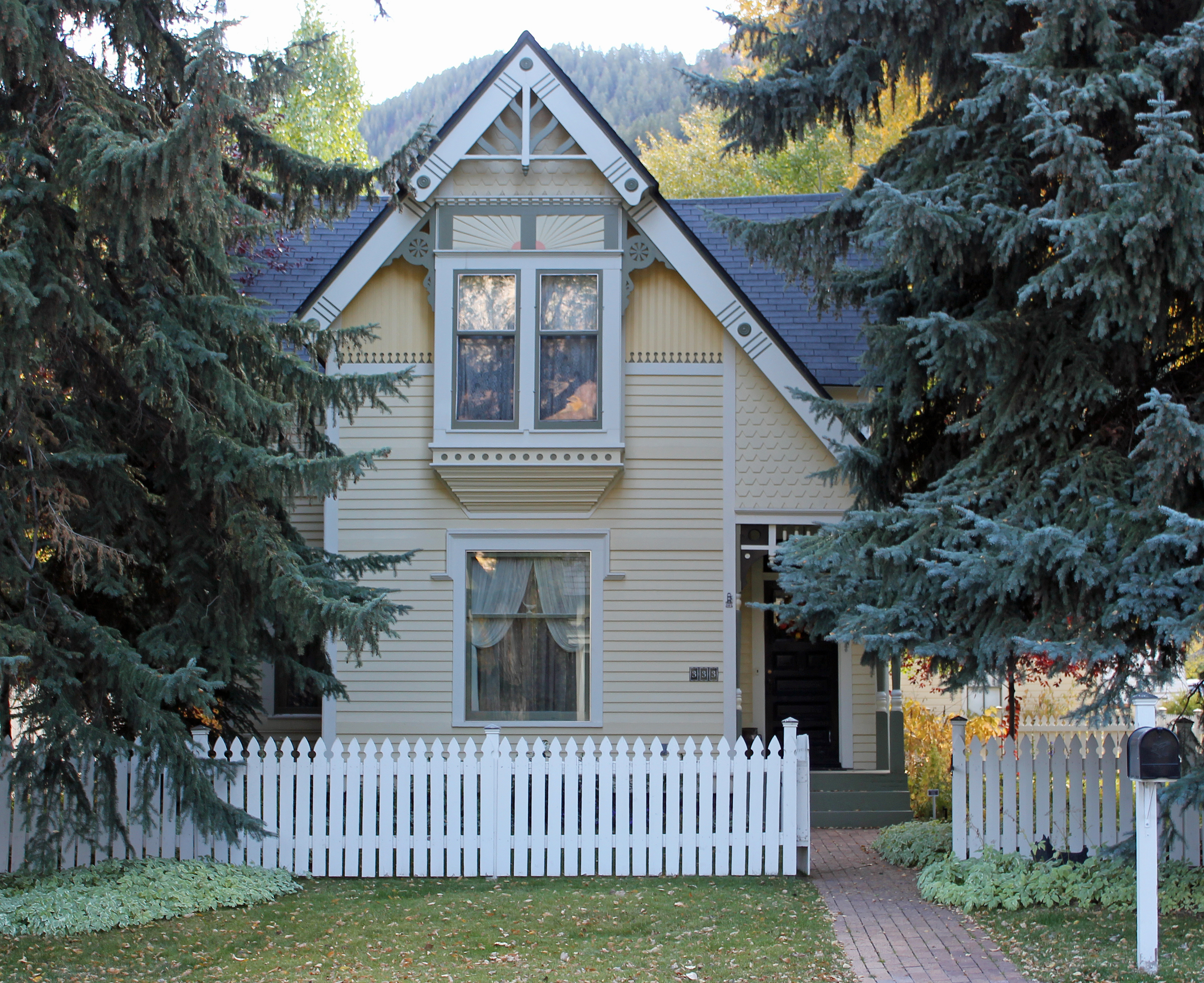
- North elevation, 2011

- Location within Colorado
- Location: Aspen, CO
- Coordinates: 39°11′33.7″N 106°49′33.4″W
- Built: 1886
- MPS: Historic Resources of Aspen
- NRHP reference No.: 87000152
- Added to NRHP: March 6, 1987

The D. E. Frantz House is located on West Bleeker Street in Aspen, Colorado, United States. It is a wooden frame house constructed for a local lumber magnate during the 1880s in the Queen Anne architectural style. It has remained a private residence ever since and is largely intact. In 1987 it was listed on the National Register of Historic Places along with other historic properties in the city. Included in the listing is a small barn in the back, although the date of its construction is not known.

It is the only Victorian house in Aspen that retains its oriel window. The extension of the gabled roof on one side to shelter the porch is also a unique feature within the city. At the time it was listed it was owned by a longtime community leader.

== Building ==
The house is on the southwest corner of the intersection of West Bleeker and North Third Street, a block north of West Main Street (State Highway 82). To the west, on the opposite side of the street, is Pioneer Park, also listed on the Register. Another listed property, the Smith–Elisha House, is a block away on West Main. The neighborhood is at the point where the hotels on the edge of downtown Aspen, to the east, give way to the residential enclaves of the city's West End. Tall shade trees are interspersed among the houses, which are mostly of more modern construction. The terrain is level, on the plain between Aspen Mountain to the south and the Roaring Fork River to the north.

A white picket fence separates the front yard from the sidewalk. The building itself is a one-and-three-quarter-story wood frame structure on a foundation of peachblow sandstone. It is topped by a steeply pitched cross-gabled roof. The main entrance is to the west of the front section, on the north face of the crossing section, on a porch with turned posts and brackets.

The house's siding is clapboard, with wide plain belt courses marking the top and bottom of the large one-over-one double-hung sash window in the center of the first story. Wood shingles are used on the section of the north (front) facade that overhangs the walkway on the east side to the front entrance. The oriel window on the second story has two smaller versions of the first-floor window with a sunburst design on the two panels above, topped by fish scale shingles in the gable apex. Vergeboard decorated with geometric patterns runs along the roofline.

The rear elevation has a French door as its entrance and a rectangular window in the gable apex. Inside, the rooms feature unpainted wooden trim and high ceilings. In the rear is a one-story gabled barn. It is considered a contributing resource to the NRHP listing.

== History ==
The house was built in 1886, during Aspen's original silver-mining boom years. According to one account, it was built by Copeland George, manager of a local sampling works. It became better known as the home of Frantz, a local lumber magnate, although it is not certain that he ever actually lived there although the wood did come from his sawmill. The date of the rear barn's construction is unknown.

It has remained a private home since then. The rear window in the gable apex may have been added later, and the picket fence was erected in 1972. Other than that it has not been significantly altered, and its colors are true to the period in which it was constructed. The oriel window is the only one remaining on a Victorian house in Aspen.

== See also ==
- National Register of Historic Places in Pitkin County, Colorado
