= Matthew Callahan Log Cabin =

Historic house in Colorado, United States

- U.S. National Register of Historic Places
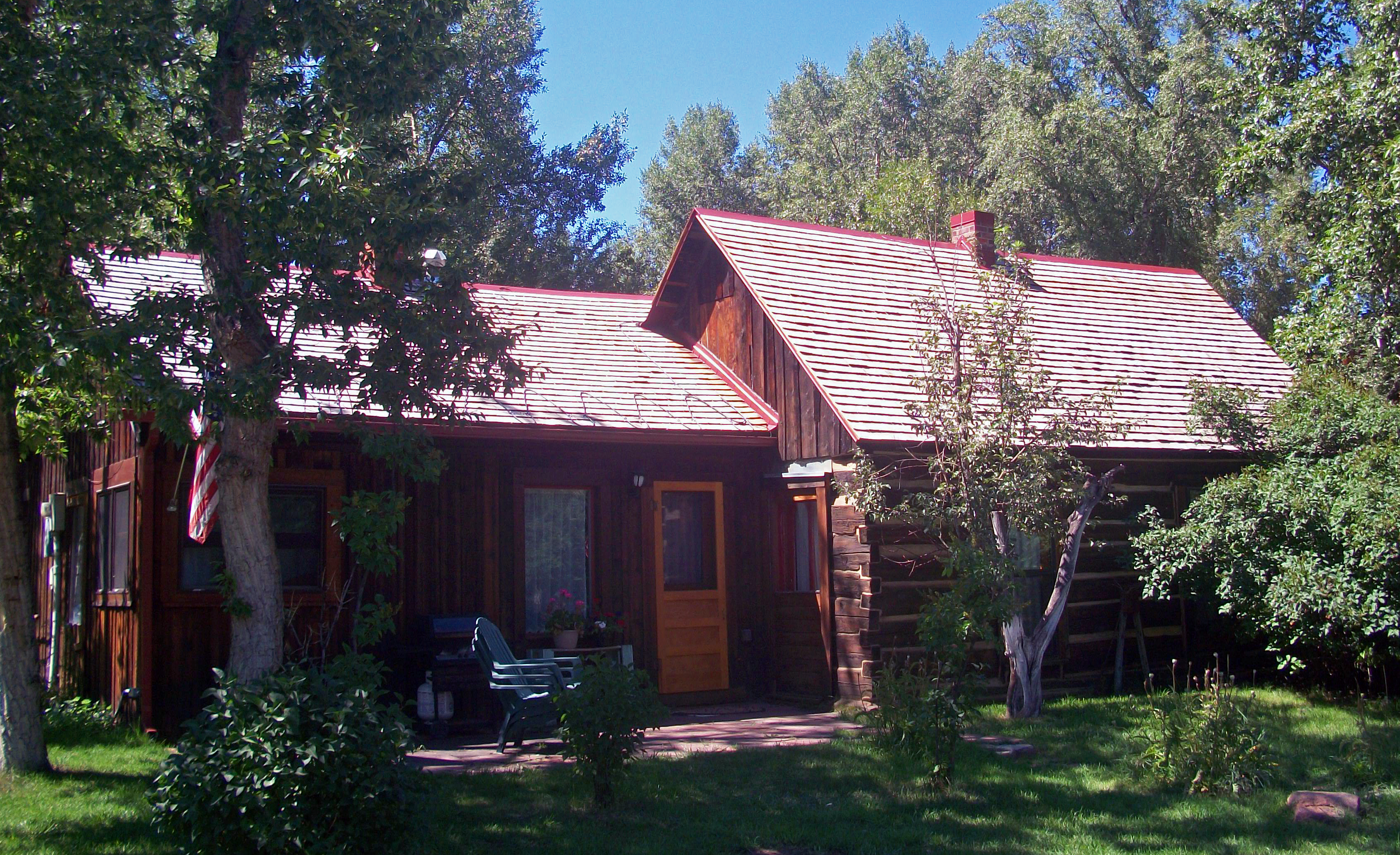
- East elevation, 2010

- Location within Colorado
- Location: Aspen, CO
- Coordinates: 39°11′28″N 106°49′36″W
- Built: Early 1880s
- Architect: Matthew Callahan
- MPS: Historic Resources of Aspen
- NRHP reference No.: 87000150
- Added to NRHP: March 6, 1987

The Matthew Callahan Log Cabin is located on South Third Street in Aspen, Colorado, United States. It was built in the early 1880s. In 1987 it was listed on the National Register of Historic Places along with a group of other historic properties in the city.

It was one of many log cabins built during Aspen's earliest years of settlement. Today it is one of the few buildings left in the city from that era, and the only one from prior to 1885 with hand-hewn logs. It has been expanded, but the original structure remains intact.

== Building ==
The cabin is located on the west side of South Third, just south of the intersection with West Hopkins Avenue, in Aspen's residential West End. There are a few single-family houses among the surrounding properties. The land is flat, with the foot of one of the ridges of Aspen Mountain just beyond West Hyman Avenue to the south. Many mature trees shade the houses in the neighborhood.

The building itself is a one-story structure built of rectangular hand-hewn logs stained a dark brown with mortar in between. At the joints the logs interlock. Above the logs the gable fields are sided in vertical flushboard. It is topped with a gabled shingled roof pierced in the center by a small brick chimney. A wooden screen door in the east corner of the south facade provides entrance. The north side is faced in board-and-batten.

Next to the screen door the southern addition, longer than the main block but not as tall, protrudes. Other than being sided in vertical flushboard similar to that in the cabin's gable fields, it has identical treatment. A complementary screen door, the main entrance, opens onto a stone-tiled patio. Its east (front) facade has two large rectangular windows with wide plain wooden surrounds. Similar windows are on the other facades, including those of another addition on the west.

== History ==
In the late 1870s, shortly after Colorado became a state, prospectors began crossing the Continental Divide at Independence Pass in search of silver deposits in the Roaring Fork Valley. Many set up their tents about ten miles (16 km) below the pass at the confluence of the Roaring Fork and its tributary Castle Creek first area they found suitable for large-scale settlement. It was called Ute City at first for the dominant local Native American tribe, but the prevalence of aspen trees in the forests soon gave it the name it has had ever since.

Those same forests provided ample timber for the construction of the log cabins that would replace the early tents as Aspen grew. There were indeed many silver lodes in the mountains surrounding Aspen, and the possible fortunes drew the attention of Eastern investors. The growing city was designated the temporary seat of newly created Pitkin County in 1881, and this attracted not only more miners but tradesmen, merchants and builders, all hoping to profit from the boom. Matthew Callahan was one of them. It is likely that he built not only the current cabin for his family, but other buildings in the growing city.

When it was built, the Callahan cabin probably had its entrance on the north. Aspen's 1889 city directory gives the family's address as 401 West Hopkins. At some point after 1890 that side was refaced in board-and-batten and the entrance moved to its current location on the addition. The original painted cedar shingles on the roof were replaced as well.

Eventually most of the original cabins were demolished to clear the way for more finished miner's cottages, and then larger wood frame or brick houses as the city prospered. Some were incorporated into other houses, as was the case with the Davis Waite House in the late 1880s. Those that remained after this period succumbed to fire or neglect in the years after the silver market collapsed following the 1893 repeal of the Sherman Silver Purchase Act. The Callahan cabin, which remained in the family for 65 years, is one of the few that have survived and remained intact, even with several additions.

== See also ==
- National Register of Historic Places listings in Pitkin County, Colorado
