= Weinglass =

Weinglass or Weinglas is a German and Yiddish surname literally meaning "wine glass" and may indicate at the occupation of wine merchant.

- Leonard Weinglass (1933–2011), American lawyer
- Leonard "Boogie" Weinglass (born 1941), American businessman
- Simona Weinglass, Israeli journalist
