= Dixon–Markle House =

Historic house in Colorado, United States

- U.S. National Register of Historic Places
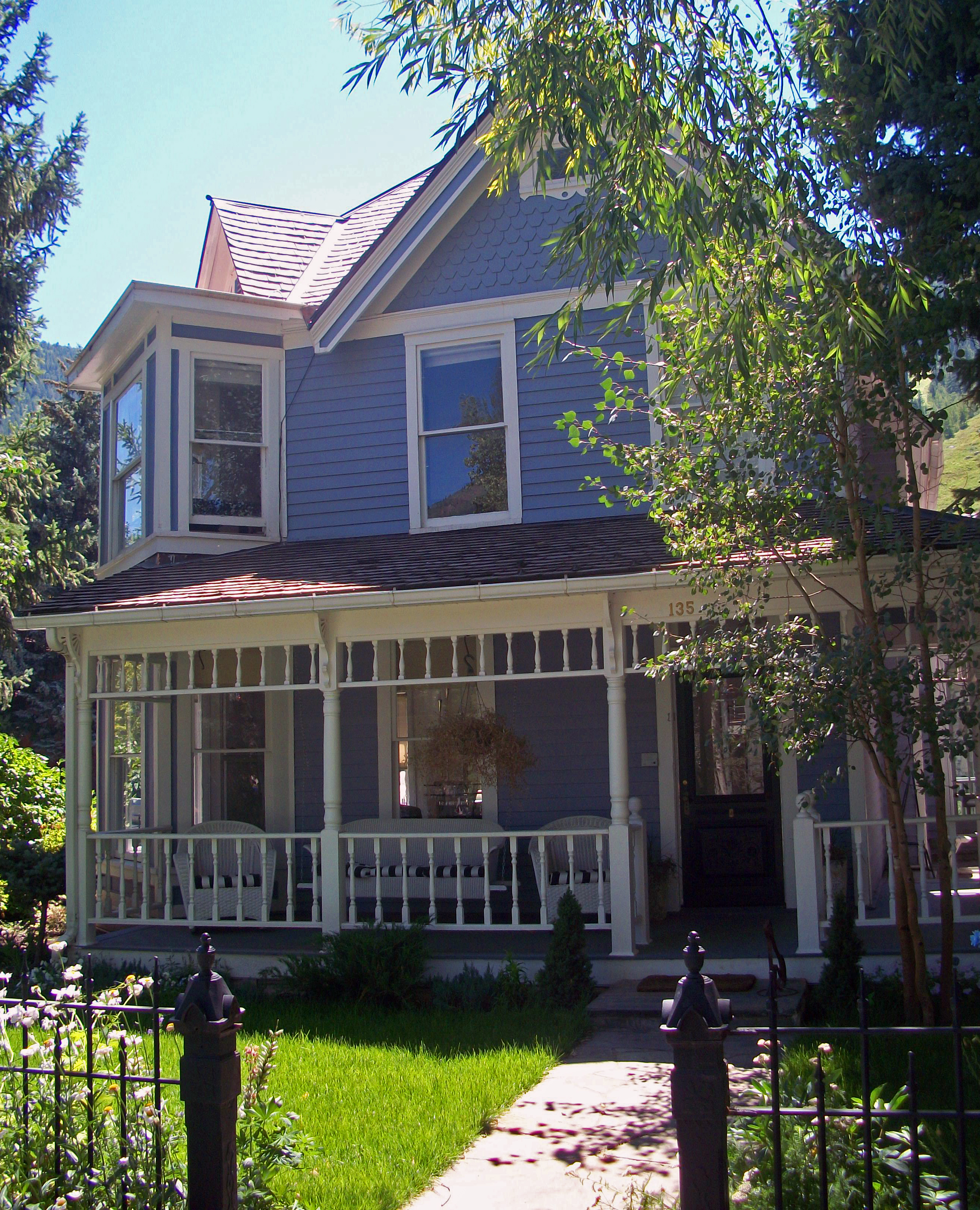
- North (front) elevation, 2010

- Location within Colorado
- Location: Aspen, CO
- Coordinates: 39°11′18″N 106°49′21″W
- Built: 1888
- Architectural style: Queen Anne
- MPS: Historic Resources of Aspen
- NRHP reference No.: 87000165
- Added to NRHP: March 6, 1987

The Dixon–Markle House is located at the corner of East Cooper Avenue and South Aspen Street in Aspen, Colorado, United States. It is a wood frame house erected in the 1880s. In 1987 it was listed on the National Register of Historic Places along with other properties in the city.

It is believed to have been the house of a successful miner during the silver-mining boom years that established Aspen. A complex application of the Queen Anne architectural style that is unique in the city, it features an unusual projecting bay on its northeast corner. It has remained relatively intact from the time of its construction.

== Building ==
The house is located on the southwest corner of the intersection, one block west of Rubey Park, which buffers the commercial eastern portion of Aspen from its residential West End. Surrounding buildings are all multiple-unit dwellings. A detached guest house faces an unnamed alley connecting South Aspen and South Garmisch streets south of the property. The terrain is level, with the slopes of Aspen Mountain rising within two blocks to the southwest and south. On the lot's north bound is a small iron fence, with a stone walk leading to the sidewalk.

The building itself is a two-and-a-half-story rectangular structure sided with clapboard and topped with a wood-shingled hipped roof gabled on the north (front) elevation. That two-bay facade has a full-length shed-roofed porch on the ground floor with turned posts, balustrade and a spindled frieze. At the northeast corner is a square-shaped two-story projecting bay topped with a gabled dormer window.

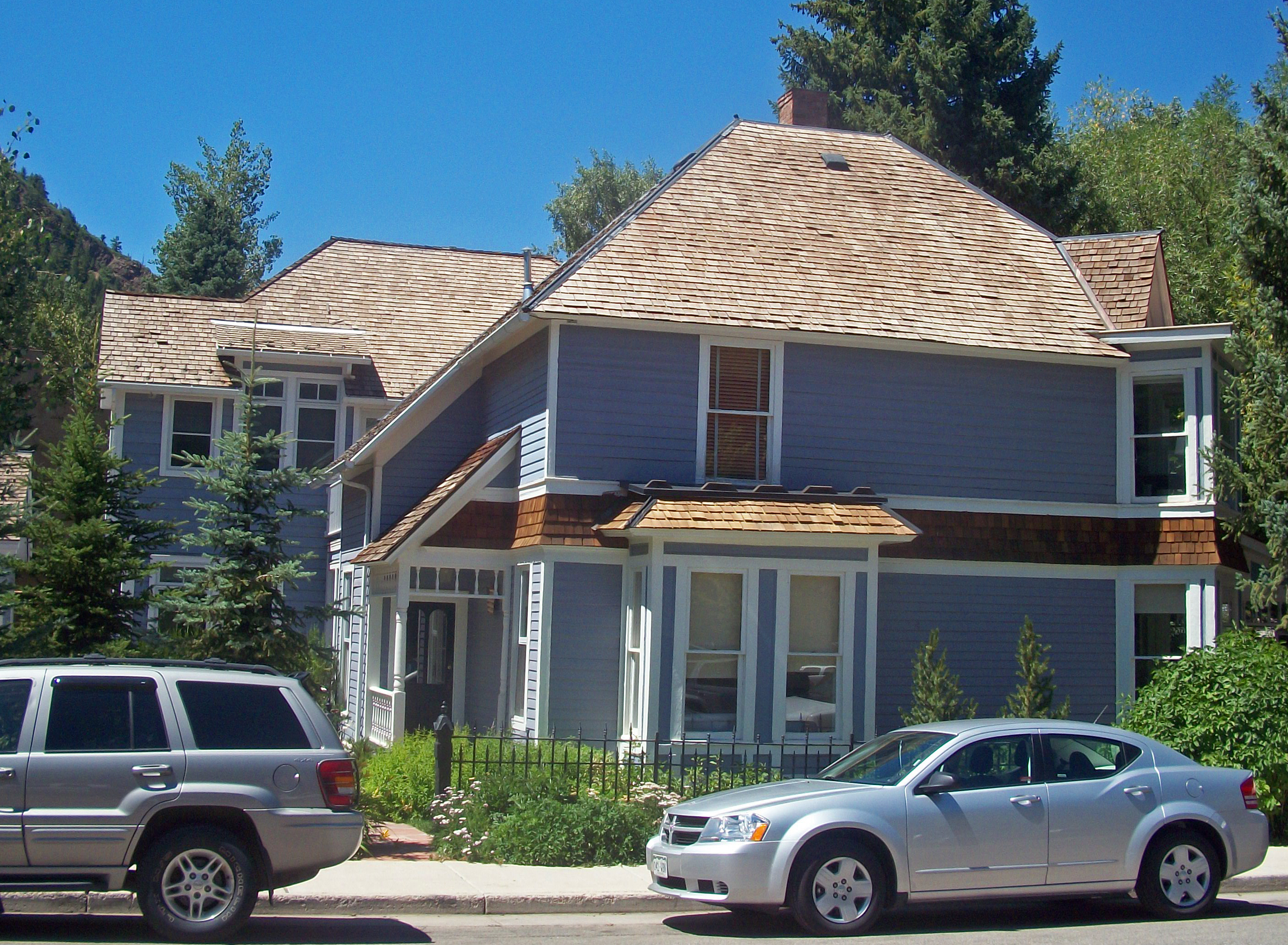
East elevation

On the east facade the porch roof is continued with a belt course of dark wood shingles, flared slightly and set off with molded surrounds. Near the south end of the facade on the first story is another slight projecting bay with a hipped roof. Its two windows are one-over-one double-hung sash, like all those on the house. There is a single window above. On the rear the shingled course ends in a steeply pitched pent-roofed porch with similar treatment to the front.

== History ==
The house was built by a J.M. Dixon, then a miner, in 1888. At that time Aspen was a prosperous, growing mining town, suffused with the wealth produced by the Colorado Silver Boom. In addition to miners, it had attracted many tradesmen, who were able to build sophisticated houses in contemporary architectural styles for the newly wealthy. The new Queen Anne Style was particularly popular at that time. Most such houses in Aspen were built from pattern-book designs, but the Dixon house appears to be a wholly unique design.

Dixon later went into real estate and finance. In the middle of the next decade, after the Panic of 1893 and the ensuing repeal of the Sherman Silver Purchase Act had ended the boom years, he sold the house to L.C. Markle, a local blacksmith. The house, like many of the others from Aspen's boom years, fell into neglect during the city's "quiet years" in the early 20th century.

By the 1950s, as Aspen was slowly reviving as a popular ski resort, the house was showing the signs of this. All the original paint had gone, and the bare wood was exposed to the elements. In 1953 the one-story gabled barn with shed-roofed addition was added at the back of the lot, on the alley.

The house itself would start to see some attention in the next decade. New bathrooms were installed along with new plumbing and electricity in 1964, and the kitchen was updated. The barn was updated into a three-story guest house shortly afterwards.

Serious restoration began in the 1980s. The porches came first, in 1982, with new foundations as well. Three years later the roof was reshingled in wood. The whole house has since been repainted.

== See also ==
- National Register of Historic Places in Pitkin County, Colorado
