= The Red Onion =

Restaurant opened in 1892 in Aspen, Colorado

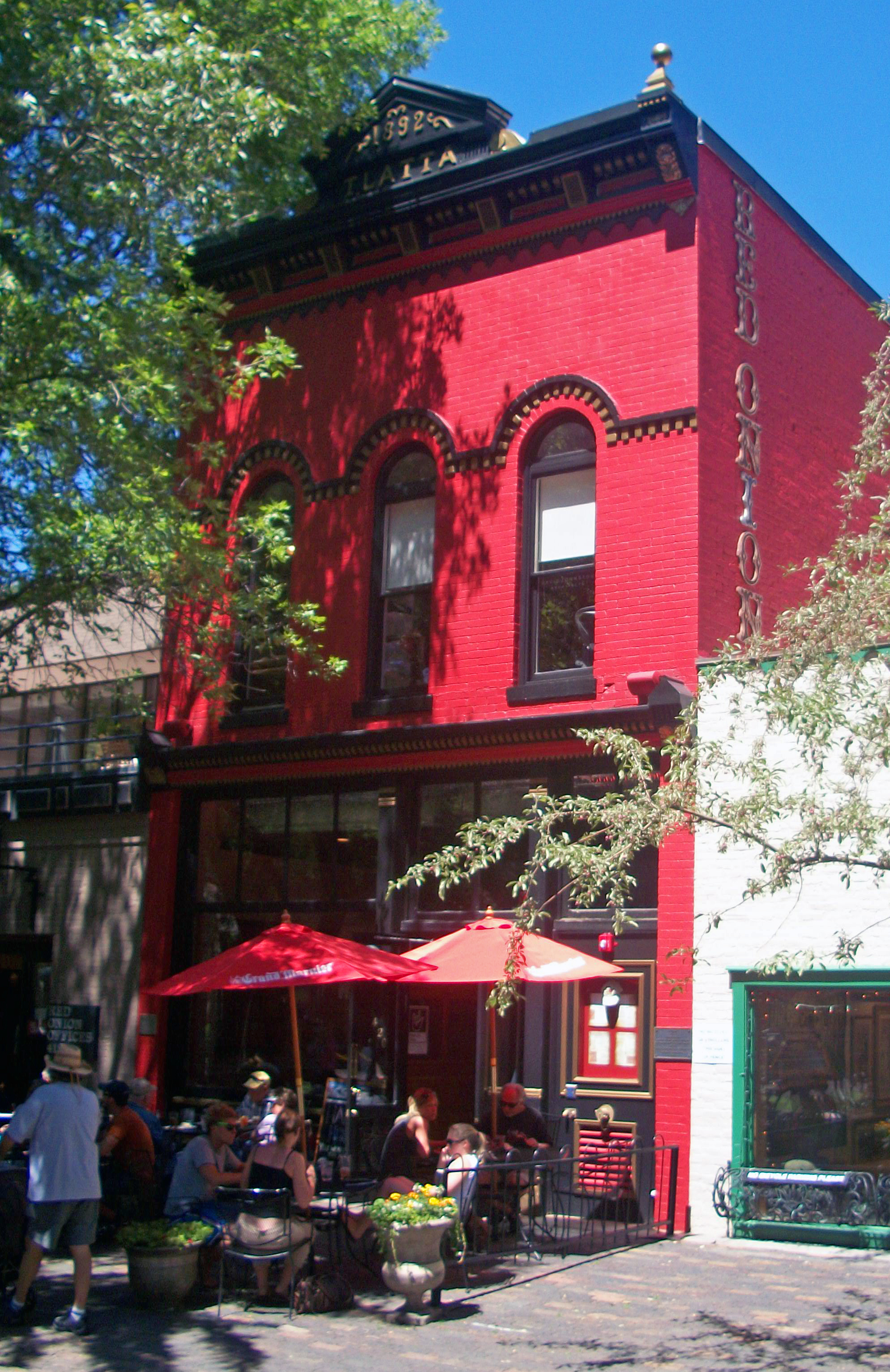
- South elevation and partial east profile, 2010

- Location within Colorado

Restaurant information
- Established: 1892
- Owners: Brad Smith and Michael Tierney
- Chef: Michael Fiske
- Food type: American
- Location: 420 E. Cooper St., Aspen, Colorado, 81611, United States
- Coordinates: 39°11′17″N 106°49′9″W
- Website: RedOnionAspen.com

- New Brick–The Brick Saloon
- U.S. National Register of Historic Places
- Architectural style: Late Victorian
- MPS: Aspen MRA
- NRHP reference No.: 87000185
- Added to NRHP: March 6, 1987

The Red Onion is a restaurant located on East Cooper Avenue in Aspen, Colorado, United States. It is the oldest restaurant in the city, housed in a three-story red brick Italianate building dating to the late 19th century. In 1987 it was listed on the National Register of Historic Places as "New Brick–The Brick Saloon", along with other historic properties in the city. It is currently closed; there are several efforts underway to reopen it.

It began as a saloon opened by an early city alderman; at one point its upper floors were reportedly home to a brothel. In its early years it was one of three dining establishments in Aspen. It retains much of its original interior, including a bullet hole in the bar. As the city became a popular ski resort, it hosted musical performances by, among others, Billie Holiday and John Denver. It continued operating under various owners for 115 years until closing for structural renovations for three years in the late 2000s.

== Building ==
The Red Onion is located on the north side of East Cooper, midway between South Galena and South Mill streets. That block of the street is a pedestrian mall, with brick walkways on either side and mature trees on either side of a small tributary of the Roaring Fork River. Tables are often located in front of the restaurant in warmer months.

Around the building, the surrounding neighborhood consists primarily of a mix of historic and modern commercial buildings, most one or two stories high. Rubey Park is to the west, a large open area between South Mill and South Monarch streets. The Wheeler Opera House, an Aspen landmark also listed on the Register, is around the corner at South Mill and East Hyman. A block to the southeast is the base station and gondola of the Aspen Mountain ski area.

The building itself is a three-bay, two-and-a-half-story brick structure topped with a roof sloping gently to the north. Its south (front) facade has a three-section glass storefront with wooden dividers. The main entrance is at the east. Above each section is a rectangular transom, eight panes in the larger western section and four in the other two. It is topped with a wood dentilled and modillioned cornice.

Three round-arched windows mark the second story. Their lower sections have one-over-one double-hung sash windows and black wooden sills. Projecting bricks form another modillioned cornice which serves as a springline for the arches, and goes around them.

At the roofline is another modillioned and dentilled cornice with ornate brackets supporting a broad overhanging eave. In the center is a small pediment with scroll brackets on the side. "1892" in gold lettering is in the entablature, surrounded by more decorations, and "T. LATTA", for the original owner, is below. Finials with spherical tops are on either end.

The side and rear facades are largely unfenestrated. Along the east side, "RED ONION" is written in golden vertical letters. The interior has its original pressed tin ceiling, bar and backbar, and clay tile floor. The latter is similar to that found at another Register-listed Aspen landmark, the Hotel Jerome at Main and Mill. It is believed that the two small Hungarian gypsy figurines over the bar, which still has the bullet hole left from an accidental discharge by a city policeman in 1899, are original as well. In the basement is the entrance to a tunnel that once led to a nearby bank building.

== History ==
First settled in 1879, Aspen grew rapidly during the Colorado Silver Boom of the 1880s; by 1890, it had reached a population of around 10,000. Two years after that, alderman Tom Latta built the unnamed brick structure on East Cooper Avenue and opened a saloon (and possibly a brothel on the upper floors). At that time it was a standalone building, with vacant lots on either side.

It quickly became popular. The early clientele were miners and other local men interested in then-popular sports such as bicycling, boxing and wrestling. It was one of only three places to buy a meal in the city. Known at first as just "the brick saloon" or "the new brick saloon", it was soon referred to as "the red onion", a contemporary colloquialism meaning something rare and unique, similar to what "white elephant" means today. Patrons were served Monongahela rye and Crab Orchard whiskey to accompany their billiards matches.

After the repeal of the Sherman Silver Purchase Act in response to the Panic of 1893, Aspen's prosperity rapidly faded. Many of its residents left town, and buildings from the boom era fell vacant. Many eventually succumbed to fire and neglect. The Red Onion remained open through a period now referred to as the city's "quiet years". In 1918 it was purchased by Tim Kelleher, who kept it open through Prohibition by serving sandwiches.

Interest in Aspen as the site of a recreational Alpine skiing area began in the late 1930s but was put on hold during World War II. After the conflict, one veteran of the Army's Tenth Mountain Division, which had done some of its early training in the area, returned to Aspen and bought the building from Kelleher in 1946. By the next year it was the only building standing on Cooper Street. During those years, Ernest Schwiebert recalled later, "Aspen was still pretty much a ghost town … [and] the saloon was clearly the social fulcrum of the town."

The veteran, John Litchfield, made the Red Onion the building's formal name and remodeled it. It became a popular place in the growing resort's après-ski scene, and hosted musical performances as well. Billie Holiday gave a notable performance at the bar in the years after this.

A new owner, Werner Kuster, built on this during the 1960s. He added a gourmet restaurant and performance space in a building next door. Many more musicians played the Red Onion during this time, as Aspen became a favored getaway of many Hollywood celebrities. John Denver, who would make Aspen his home and later wrote several songs about the area, was one performer.

In the late 1970s East Cooper Avenue was closed to vehicles and converted into a pedestrian mall. Several different restaurants occupied the space in the early 1980s, including for a time an outlet of the Red Robin hamburger chain. (Kuster sold the Onion in 1979 and passed away in retirement in Tucson, AZ on January 21, 2019.) In the 1990s, its front space was converted to retail use, and an awning stood in front of its entrance.

After several extensions, the building's owners terminated the restaurant's lease in 2006, and it closed early in the following year. At that time the Red Onion had been serving food and drink for 115 years continuously, making it the oldest such establishment in Aspen. Efforts to reopen it began soon afterwards.

Scott DeGraff, another local restaurateur, assumed the lease and began renovating the interior of the closed building. That work stopped in late 2008, and the following year the lease was terminated as financial difficulties, including liens and lawsuits against DeGraff over unpaid debts, and the slow economy. Other operators were interested, and eventually Jennifer Colosi and her brother Thomas, formerly chef/owner of the Blue Maize, another Aspen restaurant, signed a 15-year lease and finished the renovations, which Jennifer Colosi called "The Red Onion on steroids." It reopened in 2010.

Jennifer Colosi said they had no plans to change the name or use of the building. "Why would we take 100 years of branding and change it?" The menu is a largely Southwestern fare of meat dishes and sandwiches for lunch and dinner, with closing scheduled for 1 a.m. nightly. Breakfast, including dishes the Red Onion had traditionally served such as steak and eggs and chicken and waffles, is available at any time. Thomas Colosi added some of his more successful dishes from the Blue Maize, such as jalapeño poppers, steak diablo and ribeye and lobster rellenos. Late that year the Colosis resumed the Red Onion's musical traditions with a weekly open mike night built around scheduled performances by local musicians.

== See also ==
- National Register of Historic Places listings in Pitkin County, Colorado
