= Davis Waite House =

Historic house in Colorado, United States

- U.S. National Register of Historic Places
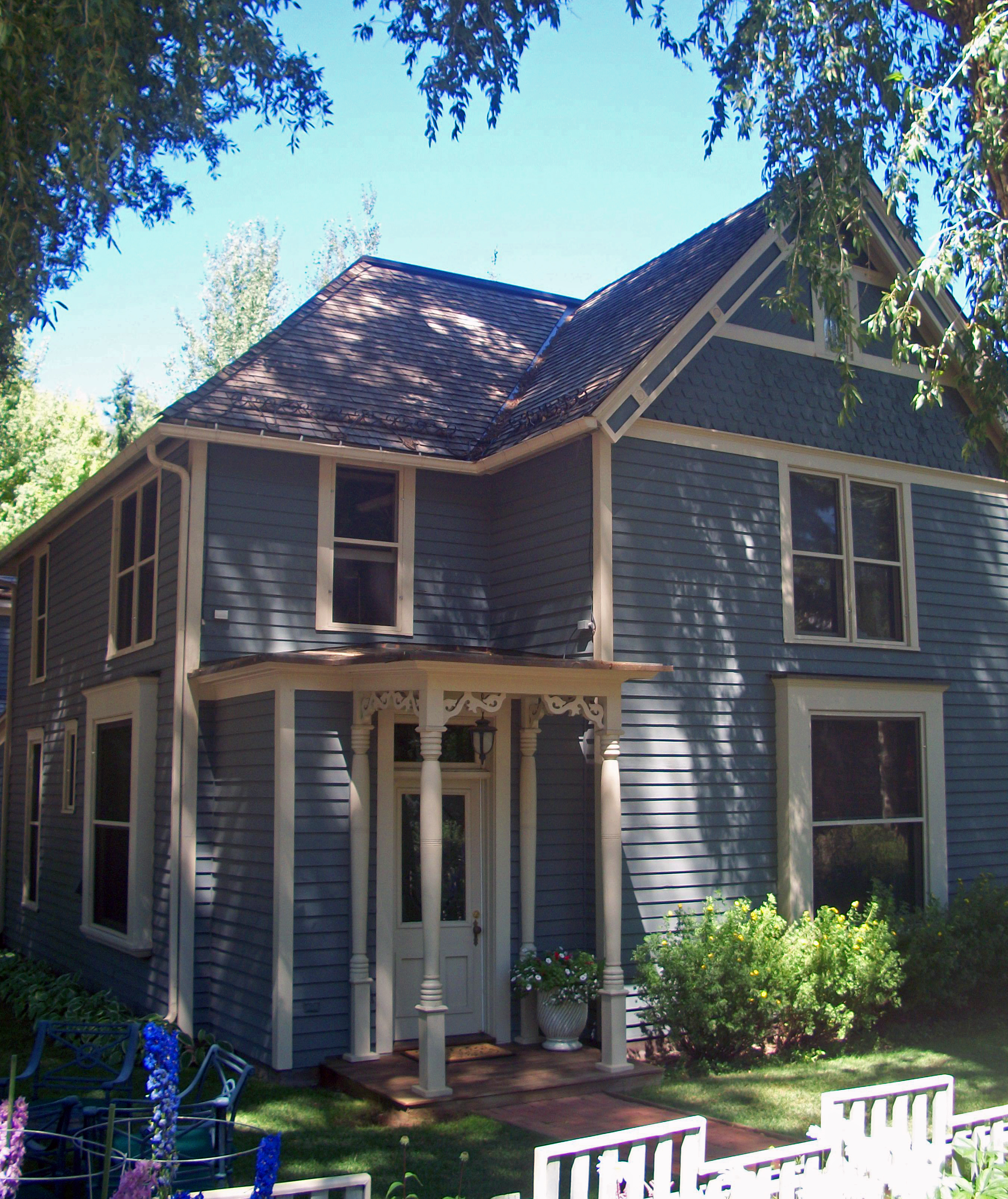
- West profile and south elevation, 2010

- Location within Colorado
- Location: Aspen, CO
- Coordinates: 39°11′39″N 106°49′26″W
- Built: 1888
- Architectural style: Victorian
- MPS: Historic Resources of Aspen
- NRHP reference No.: 87000160
- Added to NRHP: March 6, 1987

The Davis Waite House is located on West Francis Street in Aspen, Colorado, United States. It is a wooden structure in Victorian architectural styles built during the 1880s. In 1987 it was listed on the National Register of Historic Places along with several other historic properties in the city.

Davis H. Waite, an early owner, was one of the founding publishers of The Aspen Daily Times. He was later elected governor of Colorado. After a single term he returned to Aspen. Later owners included Herbert Bayer, an Austrian architect extensively involved in the mid-20th-century renovation of Aspen, and Robert Orville Anderson, an oil executive who was chairman of the Aspen Institute board.

The property includes two small outbuildings, one of which is a more modern one that has been connected to the main house since its construction. The unconnected one is believed to be one of Aspen's few remaining original log cabins, now covered in clapboard, and is thus considered a contributing resource to the National Register listing. All buildings have remained largely intact.

== Buildings and grounds ==
The house is located at the northeast corner of West Francis and North Second streets in Aspen's residential West End. The surrounding neighborhood is well-developed with other houses, most of more modern construction. At the other end of the block, on the south side of the street, is the Bowles–Cooley House, also listed on the Register. The terrain is generally level, part of a very gentle drop from the slopes of Aspen Mountain to the south towards the Roaring Fork River to the north.

There are three buildings on the lot. The main house is a two-story timber frame house on a stone foundation sided in clapboard with fish-scale shingle in the apex of the front cross-gable on the main hipped roof. The similarly cross-gabled west side projects slightly from just north of the main entrance, sheltered by a flat roof. There is a white picket fence at the street.

Trim on the exterior consists of cream-painted wood. It serves as cornerboard, window surround, and cornice dividing the clapboard and shingle sidings. The porch's flat roof is supported by turned columns, with some wood tracery brackets at their tops. Paneled vergeboard in blue and cream is at the gable roofline.

Fenestration on the south (front) facade consists of one large one-over-one double-hung sash window in a slightly projecting bay with a pair of smaller one-over-one windows at the second story. In the gable field is an even smaller attic window, set off by cream courses at the sill and lintel. A smaller one-over-one is above the main entrance. On the west side are a similar treatment as the front on the south, with a single small window on the ground floor to the north between two smaller non-projecting one-over-ones.

On the east is a small one-story gabled structure. Its clapboard siding covers a log cabin, believed to be one of the originals built by miners during Aspen's initial settlement. Because of this it is considered a contributing resource to the NRHP listing. A two-story gabled timber-frame house to the north, on the alley, now connected to the main house, is of mid-20th century construction and non-contributing.

== History ==
The house was built in 1888 by a man named Francis Orange. Aspen at the time was a booming silver mining town, growing rapidly. An early miner's cabin on the property was converted into the outbuilding.

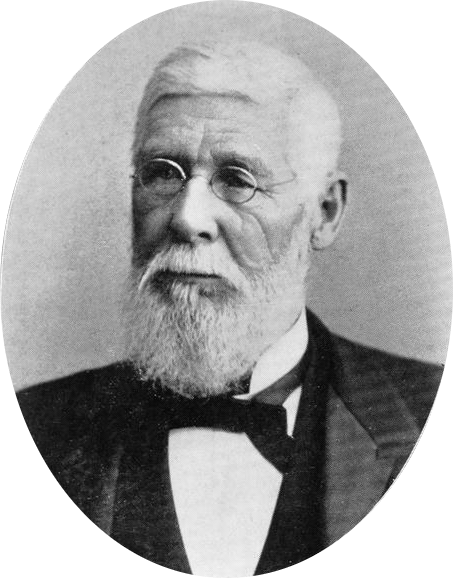
Davis Hanson Waite

One newcomer to the city was Davis Hanson Waite, a native of Jamestown, New York, who had, on his way across the country, served in the Wisconsin and Kansas state legislatures. He bought the house and settled in, starting the Aspen Weekly Times, a newspaper still published today. He remained involved in politics, and in 1892 was elected Governor of Colorado.

His two-year term began during the Panic of 1893 and the ensuing repeal of the Sherman Silver Purchase Act which ended Aspen's early prosperity. Its economic aftermath was felt statewide as well, with the Cripple Creek miners' strike the following year empowering the Western Federation of Miners, political rivals to Waite and his Populist Party. He signed the bill which made Colorado the second state to grant women the right to vote, but he was nevertheless defeated for re-election.

He returned to the house and spent his remaining years there, dying while he helped his wife prepare Thanksgiving dinner in 1900. The house survived the early 20th-century period of the city's history known as the "quiet years", during which the city's population steadily declined and many buildings from the boom year were vacant for long periods, sometimes succumbing to fire and the effects of neglect and the severe winters at nearly 8,000 feet (2,400 m) above sea level in the Rocky Mountains. Mrs. Waite lived there until her death in 1937.

In the middle of the century the city's fortunes began to change for the better. The Aspen Mountain ski resort was opened, bringing development and people back. Walter Paepcke, the Chicago industrialist who with his wife Elizabeth had financed the development of the ski resort and the Aspen Music Festival and School, sought to restore many of the old buildings that remained in order to make the city more attractive to visitors. They hired Bauhaus architect Herbert Bayer, who lived in the house while he was in Aspen, designing its current picket fence. Later, it was the home of Atlantic Richfield executive Robert Orville Anderson, who chaired the board of the Aspen Institute.

== See also ==
- National Register of Historic Places listings in Pitkin County, Colorado
