= Pioneer Park (Aspen, Colorado) =

Historic house in Colorado, United States

- Henry Webber House
- U.S. National Register of Historic Places
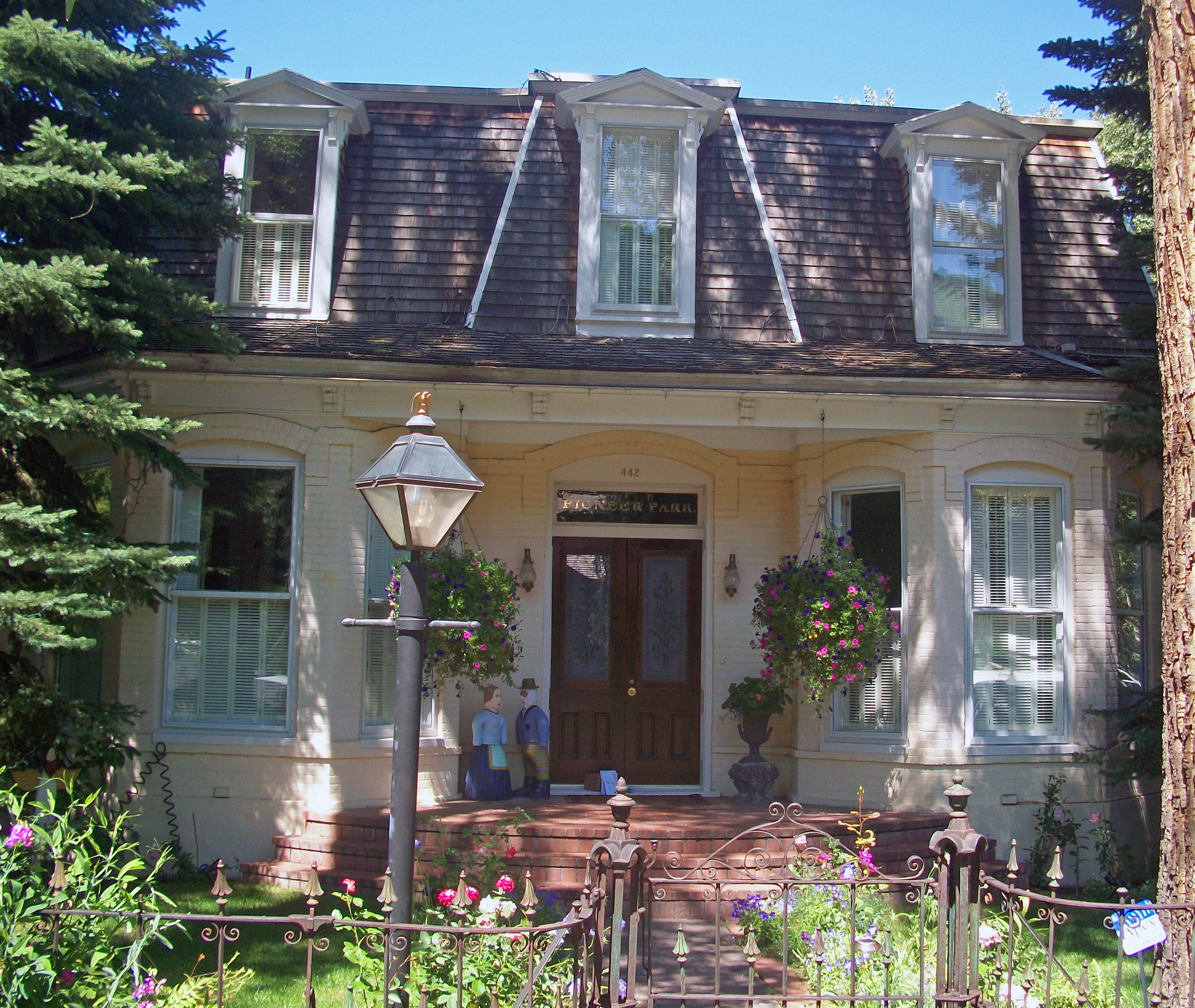
- South elevation, 2010

- Location within Colorado
- Location: Aspen, CO
- Coordinates: 39°11′35″N 106°49′36″W
- Built: 1885
- Architectural style: Second Empire
- MPS: Historic Resources of Aspen MRA
- NRHP reference No.: 87000189
- Added to NRHP: March 6, 1987

Pioneer Park, also known as the Henry Webber House or the Webber–Paepcke House, is located on West Bleeker Street in Aspen, Colorado, United States. It is a brick structure erected in the 1880s, one of the few such homes in the city. In 1987 it was listed on the National Register of Historic Places.

Henry Webber, its builder, was a shoe merchant who grew wealthy from his mining investments during Aspen's original growth during the Colorado Silver Boom. The house is said to be haunted by the ghost of his wife Harriet, who died under controversial circumstances. It is the only intact house in the Second Empire architectural style in the city, particularly on the interior. At one time it was owned by Walter Paepcke, the Chicago businessman who led Aspen's mid-20th-century renaissance as a ski resort town.

While Paepcke owned the house, he invited Albert Schweitzer to Aspen to give the keynote speech at a festival he organized to commemorate Johann Wolfgang von Goethe's bicentennial. It was Schweitzer's only visit to the U.S., and he stayed in the carriage house at the rear of the property. Today that building, a contributing resource to the Register listing, is known as Schweitzer Cottage. The house remains a private residence.

== Building and grounds ==
The house is located on the north side of West Bleeker between North Third and North Fourth streets in Aspen's residential West End. Main Street (State Highway 82) is a block to the south, and the commercial areas of downtown several blocks east. The terrain is flat, with Aspen Mountain rising abruptly and steeply two blocks to the south.

The lot occupies the entire southern half of the block below the alley midway between it and West Hallam Street to the north. Its eastern section is a landscaped area with mature cottonwood trees and curving walkways. The house itself sits in the western portion of the property, near the middle of the frontage.

=== Exterior ===
It is a one-and-a-half-story brick structure, three bays by two, topped by a shingled mansard roof. Behind the main block is a smaller rear addition. A long rectangular section projects to the west from the rear addition, putting the house on the north and east of its swimming pool. Along the front are an original iron fence and a line of tall mature mixed evergreen and deciduous trees.

The south (front) facade has two projecting polygonal bays with double-hung one-over-one sash windows, flanking the main entrance, double wooden doors reached by low, wide semicircular brick steps. "Pioneer Park" is written on the glass transom. Above it is a brick course connecting all the brick arches above the windows and the transom; it is complemented by another course at the base.

External image
- Late 20th-century view of Pioneer Park from a different angle, showing east side

Above the bracketed cornice the roof flares slightly, creating overhanging eaves. Three pedimented dormer windows with double-hung one-over-one sash pierce the steep face of the mansard roof on the upper story; the central one is additionally set in a projecting trapezoid. Above the windows the nearly flat roof peaks in the center. On the east and west sides fenestration consists of three narrow windows on the sides with a wider window in the center, all with the same one-over-one double-hung sash as the front windows. There are only two dormers on those faces. In the rear is a two-story kitchen wing with a one-story clapboard-sided timber frame addition on its west.

=== Interior ===
Wide semicircular brick steps rise to the main entrance, consisting of paneled double doors set with etched glass windows. They open into an interior that abounds in original black walnut woodwork. It is used for the doors, door and window surrounds, baseboards and stairway. Unusually, it is even used upstairs.

All rooms on the first floor have high ceilings, with the doors nearly reaching them. To the east is the living room, whose ceiling has wide molding and a plaster medallion in the center from which a chandelier hangs. In the wall is a carved marble fireplace. Opposite is a room that was used either as a library or parlor. Its fireplace has a painted wooden surround. Carved panels on its face have an abstract design; brackets support the mantelpiece.

=== Outbuildings ===
There are several outbuildings. A garage sits next to the house. In the northeast corner is a wooden octagonal summer house. The carriage house, the only outbuilding to be considered contributing to the property's historic character, is similar in appearance to the main house. It is located on the west, facing North Fourth Street at the alley, with several small brick additions on that side.

== History ==
Henry Webber arrived in Aspen with his wife Harriet from the East in 1880. She was one of 13 women who spent that winter in what was still a mining camp. At that time it was beginning to transform from a small collection of log cabins into a more permanent settlement due to the many lodes of silver being mined from the surrounding mountains. The couple started a business selling and repairing shoes and clothing. The Webbers also began investing in local mines.

Both businesses succeeded, making them wealthy, but Harriet Webber was unable to enjoy it. In 1881 she died of an overdose of strychnine, then available over the counter as a tranquilizer. Her last words, "Henry will know", led to rumors that her death was either a suicide or murder brought on by a rumored extramarital affair between him and her niece. In the end it was ruled accidental.

Webber became city treasurer in 1883. Harriet's ghost is said to haunt the house he built two years later. Aspen's newly successful were building homes in a variety of Victorian styles in the city's West End. Webber, who also built downtown Aspen's Elks Building, used the Second Empire mode for his house, not a common choice at the time in the city. It is the only one that remains intact in Aspen today, along with its original iron fence along the street.

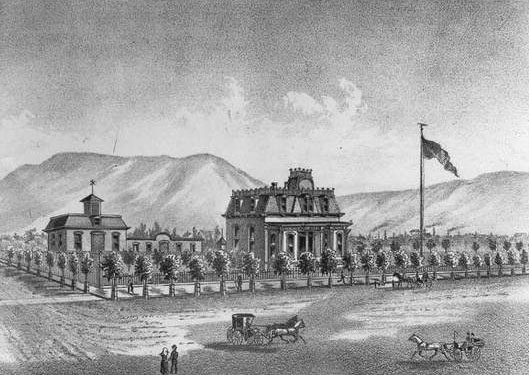
House ca. 1890

Later Webber served a term as mayor of Aspen, elected despite revelations that he had abandoned a wife and family prior to marrying Harriet. Shortly after that time, the Sherman Silver Purchase Act was repealed and the city's economy began to contract. The decades afterward, as its population declined from over 10,000 to 500 by 1930, are called "the quiet years". Many buildings and houses from the boom years were abandoned and succumbed to fire and/or the effects of severe winters at high elevation in the Rocky Mountains. The Pioneer Park house survived because after Webber's death in 1911, it became the home of the Prechtls, local blacksmiths.

In 1944 it was purchased by Walter Paepcke, a Chicago businessman who, along with his wife Elizabeth, had seen the potential Aspen offered for the development of a ski resort and financed the initial development of the Aspen Mountain ski area. The Paepckes also began efforts to make Aspen a cultural center. They are regarded as the founders of modern Aspen as a result.

As one aspect of this, in 1949 Walter Paepcke, working with University of Chicago chancellor Robert Maynard Hutchins, organized a conference and festival in Aspen to commemorate the bicentennial of German poet Johann Wolfgang von Goethe. They invited German humanist Albert Schweitzer to come from his missionary and medical work in West Africa to give the festival's keynote address; it would be his only visit to the United States during the 90 years of his life. While in Aspen, as Paepcke's guest, he stayed in the carriage house on the Pioneer Park property. It has since been named Schweitzer Cottage in his memory and designated a local landmark.

Paepcke painted the house pink while he owned it; since then it has been painted light tan. He and Elizabeth built the summer house and garage. They may also have built the additions on the carriage house, and added the marble fireplace in the living room. At some point after 1980 the additional wings on the building and the swimming pool were added. The trees along the street and the property line have also been allowed to mature, isolating and shading the house. There have been no other significant changes to the property.

== See also ==
- List of reportedly haunted locations in the United States
- National Register of Historic Places listings in Pitkin County, Colorado
