= National Register of Historic Places listings in Pitkin County, Colorado =

Location of Pitkin County in Colorado

This is a list of the National Register of Historic Places listings in Pitkin County, Colorado.

This is intended to be a complete list of the properties and districts on the National Register of Historic Places in Pitkin County, Colorado, United States. The locations of National Register properties and districts for which the latitude and longitude coordinates are included below, may be seen in a map.

There are 38 properties and districts listed on the National Register in the county.

This National Park Service list is complete through NPS recent listings posted August 28, 2026.

== Current listings ==
	Name on the Register	Image	Date listed	Location	City or town	Description
1	Armory Hall, Fraternal Hall	Armory Hall, Fraternal Hall	June 5, 1975 (#75000529)	130 S. Galena St. 39°11′23″N 106°49′05″W	Aspen	Originally built in 1892 as an armory, this building gradually came to be used for public meetings and a roller rink. Since 1956 it has been city hall.
2	Ashcroft, Colorado	Ashcroft, Colorado	May 12, 1975 (#75000533)	12 miles (19 km) south of Aspen in the White River National Forest; 39°03′16″N 106°47′52″W	Aspen	At one time in the early 1880s, a thousand people lived in this mining camp. It has been a ghost town since the last resident died in 1939.
3	Aspen Community Church	Aspen Community Church	May 12, 1975 (#75000530)	200 N. Aspen St. 39°11′32″N 106°49′15″W	Aspen	Aspen's only listed church is this Richardsonian Romanesque built in 1891 by Frederick Albert Hale for a Presbyterian congregation which became Methodist in 1934.
4	Berger Cabin	Berger Cabin	January 25, 2025 (#100011303)	835 West Main Street; 39°11′36″N 106°49′56″W	Aspen	
5	Boat Tow	Boat Tow	June 22, 1990 (#90000866)	700 S. Aspen St. 39°11′14″N 106°49′21″W	Aspen	A single wooden boat remains from the first ski lift built for the Aspen ski area. It is next to now-defunct Ski Lift No. 1, at the time of construction claimed to be the world's longest ski lift.
6	Bowles–Cooley House	Bowles–Cooley House	March 6, 1987 (#87000188)	201 W. Francis St. 39°11′38″N 106°49′25″W	Aspen	A Queen Anne Style house built in 1889 for a local lumber dealer was the largest in Aspen at that time and one of the few brick houses in that style.
7	Matthew Callahan Log Cabin	Matthew Callahan Log Cabin	March 6, 1987 (#87000150)	205 S. 3rd St. 39°11′28″N 106°49′37″W	Aspen	At the core of this expanded house is one of the few remaining original miner's cabins in the city, and the only one from prior to 1885 made of hand-hewn logs.
8	Collins Block–Aspen Lumber and Supply	Collins Block–Aspen Lumber and Supply	March 6, 1987 (#87000191)	204 S. Mill St. 39°11′22″N 106°49′10″W	Aspen	This early 1890s commercial building was the last major construction project in city until the mid-20th century. Its classical decorative touches, including colonnade, are the only ones on any commercial building in the city. Today it is home to the Caribou Club, a popular retreat for Aspen's VIPs.
9	Dixon–Markle House	Dixon–Markle House	March 6, 1987 (#87000165)	135 E. Cooper Ave. 39°11′19″N 106°49′22″W	Aspen	The unusual projecting northeast corner bay on this 1888 frame Queen Anne miner's house is a unique local design not found in pattern books or other Queen Anne homes in Aspen.
10	D.E. Frantz House	D.E. Frantz House	March 6, 1987 (#87000152)	333 W. Bleeker St. 39°11′34″N 106°49′33″W	Aspen	This 1886 Queen Anne built by a local sawmill owner is only Victorian house in Aspen that retains its original oriel window. The use of the gable to form a side porch roof is also unusual in the city.
11	Samuel I. Hallett House	Samuel I. Hallett House	March 6, 1987 (#87000155)	432 W. Francis St. 39°11′42″N 106°49′35″W	Aspen	Remnants of an original 1885 log cabin were discovered during a mid-20th-century renovation of this house expanded by a local mine owner.
12	Holden Mining and Smelting Co.	Holden Mining and Smelting Co.	June 22, 1990 (#90000867)	1000 block of W. State Highway 82; 39°11′34″N 106°50′05″W	Aspen	When built in 1891, this lixiviation facility supposedly had the state's highest smokestack. It is now preserved as a museum of ranching and mining.
13	Hotel Jerome	Hotel Jerome	March 20, 1986 (#86000459)	330 E. Main St. 39°11′27″N 106°49′10″W	Aspen	Built by Jerome B. Wheeler in 1889, this Aspen landmark was one of the first buildings west of the Mississippi to have full electric lighting. Its ballroom is the only one in Aspen above ground. In the later 20th century it became one of the city's first celebrity hangouts—Hunter Thompson used the downstairs J-bar as his de facto office during the days, and it hosted an active party and drug scene at night.
14	Hyman–Brand Building	Hyman–Brand Building	January 18, 1985 (#85000085)	203 S. Galena St. 39°11′22″N 106°49′07″W	Aspen	This 1891 sandstone commercial building is the only one remaining financed by David Hyman, an early investor in Aspen. It has been used as a gas station and car dealership since then. Today it is home to the upscale boutiques that give it and the neighboring Collins Block the nickname "Glitter Gulch".
15	Thomas Hynes House	Thomas Hynes House	March 6, 1987 (#87000157)	303 E. Main St. 39°11′26″N 106°49′13″W	Aspen	Never significantly altered, this 1887 surviving miner's cabin is considered one of the best remaining in the city. It is now a Japanese restaurant.
16	Independence and Independence Mill Site	Independence and Independence Mill Site	April 11, 1973 (#73000484)	On State Highway 82 in White River National Forest; 39°06′23″N 106°36′19″W	White River National Forest	Pitkin County's first settlement, established as a mining camp just below Independence Pass in 1879, initially prospered. The gold ran out and the population declined, with all but one leaving during a rough winter 20 years later, leaving a ghost town behind.
17	La Fave Block	La Fave Block	March 6, 1987 (#87000193)	405 S. Hunter St. 39°11′15″N 106°49′05″W	Aspen	This ornate 1888 commercial building is the second-oldest brick one in the city. It was later a ski shop, and is now one of Aspen's most valuable properties.
18	Maroon Creek Bridge	Maroon Creek Bridge	February 4, 1985 (#85000222)	State Highway 82; 39°12′04″N 106°50′57″W	Aspen	The Colorado Midland Railroad built this bridge in 1888 to open rail service to Aspen. Closed in 1929 after railroad's bankruptcy, it was widened and opened for automobile traffic in 1929. It continued to be used in that capacity, the oldest bridge in use on a Colorado highway, until a replacement bridge was built next to it in 2008.
19	New Brick–The Brick Saloon	New Brick–The Brick Saloon	March 6, 1987 (#87000185)	420 E. Cooper Ave. 39°11′18″N 106°49′10″W	Aspen	This 1892 saloon, long known as "The Red Onion" is Aspen's oldest operating restaurant.
20	Newberry House	Newberry House	March 6, 1987 (#87000158)	206 Lake Ave. 39°11′42″N 106°49′22″W	Aspen	Until 2013, Jack Nicholson owned this 1890 Shingle Style house, originally called the Judge Shaw House after an earlier owner.
21	Osgood Castle	Osgood Castle	June 28, 1971 (#71000216)	About 1 mile south of Redstone on State Highway 133; 39°10′09″N 107°14′29″W	Redstone	John C. Osgood built this eclectic blend of Tudor Revival and Swiss chalet style mansion for his company town in 1902. Later it was used as a hotel. In the 2000s it became the first real property sold by the IRS in an online auction. Now known as Redstone Castle.
22	Osgood Gamekeeper's Lodge	Osgood Gamekeeper's Lodge	July 19, 1989 (#89000933)	18679 State Highway 133; 39°10′14″N 107°14′42″W	Redstone	Details of this Swiss Chalet style residence built in 1901 for the Osgood estate serve both aesthetic and functional purposes.
23	Osgood–Kuhnhausen House	Osgood–Kuhnhausen House	August 18, 1983 (#83001327)	0642 Redstone Boulevard; 39°11′14″N 107°14′05″W	Redstone	This 1901 cottage is an intact, surviving example of the many that Osgood built for workers in Redstone.
24	Pitkin County Courthouse	Pitkin County Courthouse	May 12, 1975 (#75000531)	506 E. Main St. 39°11′26″N 106°49′03″W	Aspen	The statue of Lady Justice in front of this 1890 courthouse depicts her without her usual blindfold. In the later 20th century it was the site of several major events, such as the Claudine Longet murder trial and serial killer Ted Bundy's escape by jumping out a second-story window.
25	Redstone Coke Oven Historic District	Redstone Coke Oven Historic District	February 7, 1990 (#89002385)	State Highway 133 and Chair Mountain Stables Rd. 39°10′52″N 107°14′29″W	Redstone	Remnants of the coke ovens built by Colorado Fuel and Iron in 1899 are among the few of this type remaining in the West. An ongoing project has restored some to their original appearance.
26	Redstone Historic District	Redstone Historic District	July 19, 1989 (#89000934)	Roughly along the Crystal River from Hawk Creek to 226 Redstone Boulevard; 39°10′51″N 107°14′22″W	Redstone	The core of Redstone is a rare intact example of turn-of-the-century company town in Colorado.
27	Redstone Inn	Redstone Inn	March 27, 1980 (#80000920)	0082 Redstone Boulevard; 39°10′49″N 107°14′23″W	Redstone	This 1902 Tudor Revival–Swiss Chalet blend was originally a dormitory for unmarried coal miners.
28	Riede's City Bakery	Riede's City Bakery	March 6, 1987 (#87000182)	413 E. Hyman Ave. 39°11′20″N 106°49′10″W	Aspen	Dating to the 1880s, this is one of only two wood frame commercial buildings left in city from original boom years.
29	Sheely Bridge	Sheely Bridge	February 4, 1985 (#85000223)	Mill Street Park; 39°11′35″N 106°49′02″W	Aspen	Charles Sheely's 1911 steel truss bridge, one of his few remaining in the state, was moved to Aspen from Carbondale in the 1960s. It was one of the first trusses in Colorado to use rivets.
30	Shilling–Lamb House	Shilling–Lamb House	March 6, 1987 (#87000163)	525 N. 2nd St. 39°11′43″N 106°49′27″W	Aspen	An 1890 West End Queen Anne later home to the Aspen Music Festival cofounder, it is only house in that style in the city with an attached tower.
31	Smith–Elisha House	Smith–Elisha House	January 19, 1989 (#87002121)	320 W. Main St. 39°11′32″N 106°49′33″W	Aspen	Later called the "Christmas tree house", it was built by an early mine owner in 1890. Later it was occupied by the Elisha family, owners of Hotel Jerome in early 20th century. Today it is considered one of the city's finest Queen Annes.
32	Smuggler Mine	Smuggler Mine	May 18, 1987 (#87000194)	Smuggler Mountain; 39°11′34″N 106°48′24″W	Aspen	The only silver mine still operating in Aspen was, in its day, responsible for one-fifth of the country's silver production. Largest silver nugget ever, weighing more than a ton, was mined here in 1890s.
33	Soldner Home and Studio		October 24, 2022 (#100006799)	0501 Stage Rd. 39°12′31″N 106°51′23″W	Aspen vicinity	
34	Ute Cemetery	Ute Cemetery	April 1, 2002 (#02000291)	Ute Ave. 39°10′55″N 106°48′44″W	Aspen	Established in 1880 to bury an early pioneer, it became the final resting place of many of Aspen's working-class residents through the Depression.
35	Davis Waite House	Davis Waite House	March 6, 1987 (#87000160)	234 W. Francis St. 39°11′40″N 106°49′27″W	Aspen	This 1888 Victorian house was the home of Davis H. Waite, one-term governor of Colorado and Aspen Daily Times co-founding publisher.
36	Henry Webber House–Pioneer Park	Henry Webber House–Pioneer Park	March 6, 1987 (#87000189)	442 W. Bleeker St. 39°11′36″N 106°49′36″W	Aspen	The 1885 home of local shoe merchant and mining investor Henry Webber is the only intact Second Empire house in Aspen. Albert Schweitzer stayed in its carriage house in 1949 during his only visit to the U.S.
37	Wheeler Opera House	Wheeler Opera House	August 21, 1972 (#72000276)	330 E. Hyman Ave. 39°11′22″N 106°49′12″W	Aspen	This 1889 sandstone building, Aspen's first listed property, still has a walk-in safe from the original bank on its first floor. The interior was extensively renovated in mid-20th century from a design by Herbert Bayer.
38	Wheeler–Stallard House	Wheeler–Stallard House	May 30, 1975 (#75000532)	620 W. Bleeker St. 39°11′38″N 106°49′44″W	Aspen	This Queen Anne house was built in 1888 by early Aspen entrepreneur Jerome Wheeler. Later it was owned by Walter Paepcke. Since 1969 it has been home to the Aspen Historical Society.

== See also ==
- List of National Historic Landmarks in Colorado
- List of National Register of Historic Places in Colorado
- Bibliography of Colorado
- Geography of Colorado
- History of Colorado
- Index of Colorado-related articles
- List of Colorado-related lists
- Outline of Colorado
