= Newberry House =

Historic house in Colorado, United States

- U.S. National Register of Historic Places
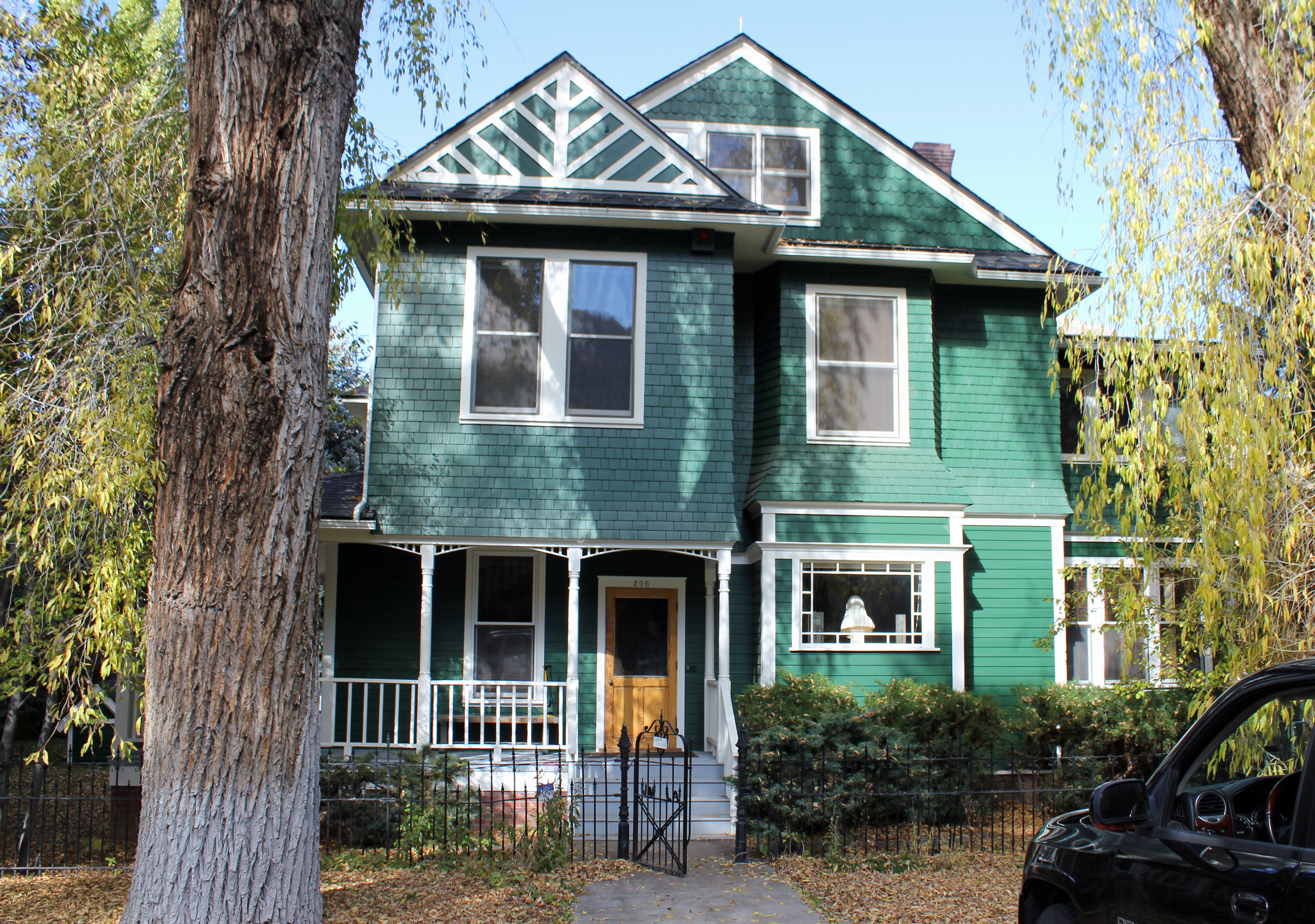
- South elevation, 2011

- Location within Colorado
- Location: Aspen, CO
- Coordinates: 39°11′42″N 106°49′22″W
- Built: ca. 1890
- Architectural style: Shingle Style
- MPS: Historic Resources of Aspen
- NRHP reference No.: 87000158
- Added to NRHP: March 6, 1987

The Newberry House, also known as the Judge Shaw House, is located on Lake Avenue in Aspen, Colorado, United States. It is a wooden structure in the Shingle Style built around 1890. In 1987 it was listed on the National Register of Historic Places along with other properties in the city.

It incorporates an unusual carriage house into its overall design, the only house in Aspen to do so. In 1922 William Shaw, an attorney who had specialized in water law, moved in, following his ascension to the city's judgeship the previous year. He remained in the house until 1969, during which time Aspen went from a depressed former mining town to a bustling, glamorous ski resort, a process he played a small role in.

After his tenure, the house passed to other owners, eventually becoming one of several Aspen properties owned by Jack Nicholson, one of the celebrities who had early on been drawn to Aspen as a retreat, until he sold it in 2013. It has remained intact with few alterations.

== Building ==
The house occupies a 0.27-acre (1,100 m^{2}) lot on the north side of Lake Avenue, the northernmost street in Aspen's predominantly residential West End, at the oblique three-way intersection Lake makes with North First and West Smuggler streets. The terrain is generally level, sloping slightly towards the Roaring Fork River to the north. To the south and west are houses generally of a similar scale, or larger, and more modern construction. On the north and east is a small lake and woodlands, and north of them the river. Tall mature trees shade many of the houses.

The house itself is a two-and-a-half-story wood frame structure on a brick foundation. It is sided in clapboard on the first story, shingles on the second and fishscale shingles in the attic gable field. At the top is a complex gabled roof pierced by a brick chimney. A low iron fence and gate separates the house from the street.

On the three-bay south (front) facade, the western two bays are on a small projecting section. A veranda begins here and wraps around the house's west side. It has a wooden rail with regular turned posts supporting the slightly flared upper story. Behind it are a double-hung one-over-one sash window and plain wooden door. The upper story has a double one-over-one sash. A wide overhanging eave at the roofline sets off its projecting nested gable, decorated with half-timbers.

To the east the single rectangular bay is also on a projecting section. It has a rectangular picture window with decorative muntins along the sides. Above a molded cornice continues from the porch roofline to the east side of the projection. A similar, plainer cornice marks the bottom of the flaring on the second story, where the projection narrows to not much wider than the single one-over-one double-hung sash on that floor. Three smaller one-over-ones are in the main gable apex.

On the west side there is a single-pane window under a pent roof next to the porch. Above it is a section with a hip roof and four casement windows. At the rear the carriage house, with four sliding doors, projects from the house.

== History ==
Aspen went from a rough settlement of tents and log cabins in the late 1870s to a bustling silver mining boomtown of around 10,000 by 1890, when the house is believed to have been built. While the city's entire street grid pattern had been plotted out early, most development was concentrated in the city's eastern section, where its commercial and civic center was and is. Residents who had made their fortune from mining or related businesses chose to build their houses in the undeveloped West End.

The area where the house was built was known as Hallam's Subdivision, after an early developer of the town who bought it in the early 1880s with the intention of building a park with walks, drives and pavilions. The lake was to be stocked with trout. Other than the pavilions, none of this ever came to pass and houses were built on the tract instead. From the use of the Shingle Style, it is likely that the Newberry House was built in the early 1890s, when that became popular. The attached carriage house is a unique feature in the city.

Prosperity came to an abrupt end with the Panic of 1893. In response to the crisis, Congress repealed the Sherman Silver Purchase Act, which had required the federal government to buy silver to support the dollar, to ease fears of inflation. Aspen had been unaffected by the crisis itself, but with the silver market limited to private purchasers, most of its mines became unprofitable. Residents began leaving for more promising opportunities elsewhere, such as Cripple Creek, Colorado. The city's population steadily declined, beginning a period of several decades known as "the quiet years".

Many of the buildings from Aspen's glory years went vacant and neglected. Some succumbed to either fire or the harsh effects of long and severe mountain winters at almost 8,000 feet (2,400 m) above sea level. The Newberry House endured, and in 1922 it was purchased by William Shaw, a local water-law attorney who had become a Pitkin County judge the year before. There is no record of the seller, Mrs. Alex Tompkins, other than this transaction.

In the years before World War II, when the city's population had declined to a few hundred year-round residents, some downhill skiing enthusiasts who chanced on Aspen noticed that the mountains around the city had slopes that would make an ideal place for their hobby, then beginning to establish itself as a recreational activity. Before the war, some had cut trails and built a primitive ski lift from leftover mining equipment. This was put on hold when the United States became involved in World War II in 1941, but Aspen continued to attract interest as a winter-sports destination when members of the Tenth Mountain Division, the Army's "soldiers on skis", who trained at nearby Camp Hale, visited the city when on leave. After the war, many of the Tenth's veterans became involved in the development of skiing, and some returned to Aspen to do so.

At the same time, Walter Paepcke, chairman of the Container Corporation of America, on vacation elsewhere in Colorado, visited Aspen at the behest of his wife Elizabeth. She had gone there with some friends to sample the skiing, and found it an ideal place for the classical-music festival the couple were looking to start as an American counterpart to the Salzburg Festival in Austria. The mountain location was comparable, and the remaining Victorian houses and commercial buildings added a great deal of charm, although many would need to be restored.

In order to discreetly acquire those properties, many of which had been foreclosed and were available for the small sum of unpaid property taxes, Paepcke retained Shaw as his local attorney. As a county judge, Shaw was able to smooth over the transfer of some properties which lacked clear title. Eventually the Paepckes acquired many of Aspen's landmarks, such as the Hotel Jerome and Wheeler Opera House, as well as many of the houses in the West End, and hired Bauhaus architect Herbert Bayer to refurbish them.

Paepcke invested heavily in the new Aspen Skiing Company, and was eventually able to start the first Aspen Music Festival in 1949. With the founding of the Aspen Institute, the city became an attraction for corporate executives and intellectuals. Movie stars began to find Aspen a pleasant place to stay as well, and Shaw would officiate at the 1965 wedding of Kim Novak and Richard Johnson in a mountain meadow at the ski resort.

After Shaw died in 1969, the house eventually became the property of another Hollywood celebrity drawn to Aspen. Jack Nicholson and his friend, record producer Lou Adler, had bought homes in the city after learning to ski in Gstaad. Neither one, it turned out, was located in an area with good television reception. After finding out that the Judge Shaw house did get a good signal, they split the purchase price in order to have a place in Aspen where they could watch Los Angeles Lakers basketball games together. They sold the house in 2013 to a Beverly Hills-based limited liability corporation.

The house is largely the same as it was in a 1919 photo. A 1981 renovation added screens to the porches. Some of the exterior windows may not be original, either.

== See also ==
- National Register of Historic Places in Pitkin County, Colorado
