= George and Eugene Markle House =

Historic house in Michigan, United States

- U.S. National Register of Historic Places
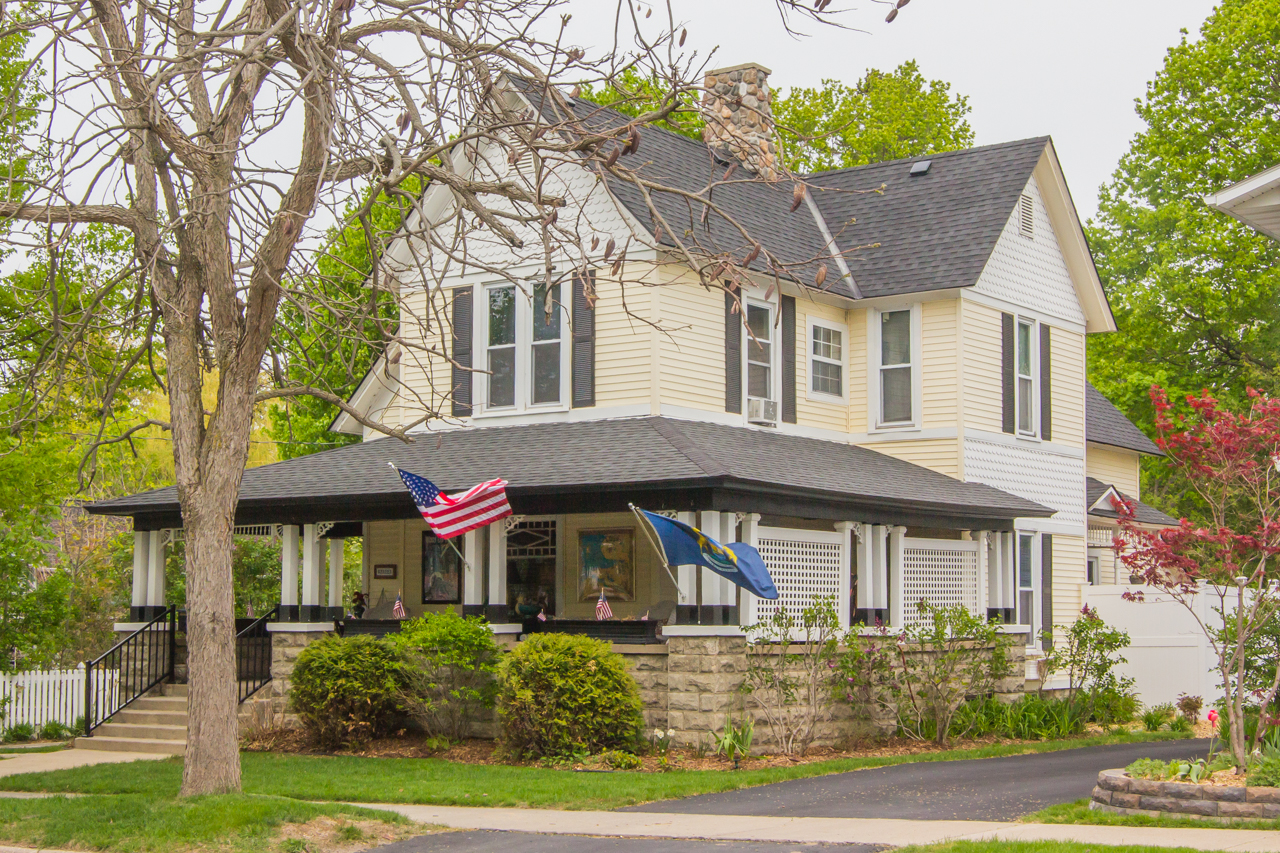

- Location within Michigan Location within the United States
- Interactive map
- Location: 701 Kalamazoo St., Petoskey, Michigan
- Coordinates: 45°22′14″N 84°56′43″W
- Area: 0.3 acres (0.12 ha)
- Architectural style: Queen Anne
- MPS: Petoskey MRA
- NRHP reference No.: 86002023
- Added to NRHP: September 10, 1986

The George and Eugene Markle House is a private house located at 701 Kalamazoo Street in Petoskey, Michigan, United States. It was placed on the National Register of Historic Places in 1986.

The George and Eugene Markle House is a two-story frame cross-gable Queen Anne house. A two-story shed roofed addition fills the angle between the walls behind the front porch. The porch itself is a hip-roofed wraparound porch with Doric piers. The house is clad with clapboard, with the gables covered with decorative shingling.

The house was constructed before 1899, and is associated with George and Eugene Markle, who owned and operated the nearby Markle Machine Works.
