= Jacob F. Markle Stone House =

Historic house in New York, United States

- U.S. National Register of Historic Places
- Jacob F. Markle Stone House, September 2012

- Location within New York Location within the United States
- Location: 335 Whitfield Rd., Rochester, New York
- Coordinates: 41°49′59″N 74°13′3″W
- Area: 50 acres (20 ha)
- Built: 1770
- MPS: Rochester MPS
- NRHP reference No.: 95000948
- Added to NRHP: August 10, 1995

Jacob F. Markle Stone House is a historic home located at Rochester in Ulster County, New York. It is a 1 1/2-story, five-bay stone dwelling built about 1770 upon a linear plan. Also on the property is a 1 1/2-story gable-front frame shed.

It was listed on the National Register of Historic Places in 1995.
