= Leonard "Boogie" Weinglass =

American businessman (born 1941)

Leonard "Boogie" Weinglass (born 1941) is an American businessman who founded retailer Merry-Go-Round and a chain of restaurants named Boogie's Diner. His early life was portrayed by actor Mickey Rourke in the 1982 American film Diner.

== Personal history ==
In 1968 Weinglass opened the first Merry-Go-Round retailer on Peachtree Street in Atlanta, in the heart of that town's hippie district. The store was known for tie-dyed T-shirts, Sgt. Pepper jackets, bell-bottoms, and the occasional pot pipe. Together with business partner Harold Goldsmith, who died in a private airplane crash in Aspen, Colorado, in 1991, Weinglass built Merry-Go-Round into an international publicly traded retailer with over $1 billion in annual sales, 1,500 stores and 15,000 employees. In 1987, Merry-Go-Round was ranked 34th on Forbes list of the 200 best companies in America, with a five-year average return on equity of 29.1 percent. In 1988, Merry-Go-Round made its first foray into the Manhattan market, opening a 3,500-square-foot store in the East Village.

Weinglass attended Forest Park High School (Maryland) in mostly Jewish northwest Baltimore in the 1950s, where he was a frequent truant. He was a fixture in a teen scene that centered on hanging out in diners. His childhood friends included Ellen Naomi Cohen, who later achieved fame as Mama Cass Elliot of the rock band the Mamas and the Papas, and Barry Levinson, the Academy Award-winning movie director. Levinson chose to pay homage to the Baltimore of his youth and Weinglass in his first feature film, Diner. In the film, the character "Boogie", a womanizing prankster played by actor Mickey Rourke, was patterned directly after Weinglass.

After leaving Merry-Go-Round Weinglass opened a string of retail locations called Boogie's Diner, the first clothing and food concept mix. This is a combination 1950s-style diner, clothing, and memorabilia boutique. The stores expanded to a total of six locations including Chicago, New York, Las Vegas, Washington, DC, and Los Angeles, with the anchor location in Aspen, CO. By 2000, all had closed with the exception of the Aspen location, which remained one of the signature 'go-to' restaurants in town until Weinglass sold the building housing the diner in early 2015. The diner was the basis for a short-lived Canadian sitcom called Boogies Diner.

Weinglass made several unsuccessful attempts to purchase professional sports teams for his native Baltimore. In 1992 Weinglass attempted to entice the National Football League to expand to Baltimore, nine years after the city's beloved Colts moved to Indianapolis. The league bypassed Baltimore and expanded to Jacksonville and Charlotte, NC instead. In 1991, Weinglass pursued a stake in the Baltimore Orioles, but then owner Eli Jacobs decided to maintain control over the team.

In February 1993, Weinglass was brought back to Merry-Go-Round to resurrect the company. However the effort failed and the retailer filed for bankruptcy protection in 1994.
