= Aspen Mountain (Colorado) =

Mountain in Colorado, United States

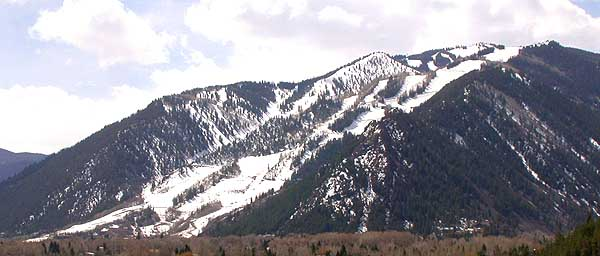
- Aspen Mountain, seen from the northwest showing the lower ski runs of the Aspen Mountain ski area

Highest point
- Elevation: 10,705 ft (3,263 m)
- Prominence: 80 ft (24 m)
- Isolation: 0.80 mi (1.29 km)
- Coordinates: 39°10′34″N 106°49′45″W

Geography
- Location within Colorado
- Location: Pitkin County, Colorado, U.S.
- Parent range: Elk Mountains
- Topo map(s): USGS 7.5' topographic map Aspen, Colorado

Aspen Mountain is a mountain summit in the Elk Mountains range of the Rocky Mountains of North America. The 11,212-foot (3,417 m) peak is located in White River National Forest, 1.4 miles (2.2 km) south-southeast (bearing 162°) of downtown Aspen in Pitkin County, Colorado, United States. The north face of the mountain is the location of the Aspen Mountain ski area, one of four adjacent ski areas operated collectively as Aspen/Snowmass.

== Mountain ==
Aspen Mountain is not particularly high, relative to other mountains in Colorado, but nonetheless looms over the town of Aspen because of the proximity of the town, which was founded as a silver mining camp in 1879 during the Colorado Silver Boom. The mountain flank was the site of intense mining activity in the late 1880s and early 1890s, with many remains of mining activity below and on the surface of the mountain. In the middle 20th century it became the site of recreational downhill skiing. In 1946, the newly formed Aspen Skiing Company, founded by Walter Paepcke, built the first chairlift to the top of the mountain and opened the ski area that bears the name of the mountain. Nowadays, people use a modern gondola, which holds six people, to get to the top of the mountain.

Aspen Mountain is alternatively called Ajax by the locals.

== See also ==
- List of Colorado mountain ranges
- List of Colorado mountain summits
  - List of Colorado fourteeners
  - List of Colorado 4000 meter prominent summits
  - List of the most prominent summits of Colorado
- List of Colorado county high points
