= Sherman Silver Purchase Act =

1890 United States law

- Other short titles: Act of July 14, 1890
- Long title: An Act directing the purchase of silver bullion and the issue of Treasury notes thereon, and for other purposes.
- Enacted by: the 51st United States Congress
- Effective: July 14, 1890

Citations
- Statutes at Large: 26 Stat. 289

Codification
- Acts amended: Bland–Allison Act (superseded)

Legislative history
- Introduced in the Senate as S. 2348 by John Sherman (R‑OH) on January 28, 1890; Committee consideration by Senate Committee on Finance; Passed the Senate on June 17, 1890 (42–25); Passed the House on June 25, 1890 (145–28); Reported by the joint conference committee on July 1890; agreed to by the House on July 12, 1890 (122–90 (agreed to conference report)) and by the Senate on July 10, 1890 (39–26 (agreed to conference report)); Signed into law by President Benjamin Harrison on July 14, 1890

The Sherman Silver Purchase Act was a United States federal law enacted on July 14, 1890, which increased the amount of silver the government was required to purchase on a recurrent monthly basis to 4.5 million ounces, roughly the entirety of the American output.

The act did not authorize the free and unlimited coinage of silver that the Free Silver supporters wanted. Instead, it had been passed in response to the growing complaints of farmers' and miners' interests. Farmers are usually debtors, with mortgages on their farms and loans on their crops; deflation meant that they had to pay back these loans in more expensive dollars, and this act promotes inflation. Mining companies, meanwhile, had extracted vast quantities of silver from western mines. The resulting oversupply drove down the price of their product, often to below the point at which the silver could be profitably extracted. They hoped to enlist the government to increase the demand for silver.

Originally, the bill was simply known as the Silver Purchase Act of 1890. Only after the bill was signed into law did it become the "Sherman Silver Purchase Act." Senator John Sherman, an Ohio Republican and chairman of the Senate Finance Committee, was not the author of the bill, but once both houses of Congress had passed the Act and the Act had been sent to a Senate/House conference committee to settle differences between the Senate and House versions of the Act, Sherman was instrumental in getting the conference committee to reach agreement on a final draft of the Act. Nonetheless, once agreement on the final version was reached in the conference committee, Sherman found that he disagreed with many sections of the act. So tepid was Sherman's support that when he was asked his opinion of the act by President Benjamin Harrison, Sherman ventured only that the bill was "safe" and would cause no harm if the President signed it.

The act was enacted in tandem with the McKinley Tariff of 1890. William McKinley, an Ohio Republican and chairman of the House Ways and Means Committee, worked with John Sherman to create a package that could both pass the Senate and receive the President's approval.

Under the Act, the federal government purchased millions of ounces of silver, with issues of paper currency. It became the second-largest buyer in the world, after the British Crown in India, where the Indian rupee was backed by silver rather than gold. Instead of the $2 million to $4 million that had been required by the Bland–Allison Act of 1878, the US government was now required to purchase 4.5 million ounces of silver bullion every month. The law required the Treasury to buy the silver with a special issue of Treasury (Coin) Notes that could be redeemed for either silver or gold. The result was the substantial expansion in the volume of circulating dollars without a proportionate growth in the gold stock. The crash in the silver dollar's bullion value in the 1890s from 80 cents to approximately 50 cents increased public anxiety on their continued ability to convert silver dollars and banknotes into gold. The result was a run on the Treasury's gold stock and the onset of the Panic of 1893. President Grover Cleveland summoned an emergency session of Congress on August 7, 1893, for the repeal of the act to prevent the further depletion of the government's gold reserves.

In 1890, the price of silver dipped to $1.16 per ounce. By the end of the year, it had fallen to $0.69. By December 1894, the price had dropped to $0.60. On November 1, 1895, US mints halted production of silver coins, and the government closed the Carson City Mint. Banks discouraged the use of silver dollars. The years 1893–95 had the lowest productions of Morgan dollars for the entire series, creating several scarce coins.

== Sources ==
- Allen, Larry (1999). "Sherman Silver Act of 1890 (United States)". The Encyclopedia of Money (1st ed.). Santa Barbara, CA: ABC-CLIO. pp. 251–252. ISBN 978-1-57607-037-6.
- Socolofsky, Homer E.; Spetter, Allan B. (1987). The Presidency of Benjamin Harrison. Lawrence, KS: University Press of Kansas. ISBN 978-0-7006-0320-6.
- Van Dusen, Laura King (2013). "Sherman Silver Purchase Act". Historic Tales from Park County: Parked in the Past. Charleston, SC: The History Press. ISBN 978-1-62619-161-7.
- Gordon, John Steele (1999). The Great Game: The Emergence of Wall Street as a World Power: 1653–2000. Scribner. ISBN 0684832879.
