= Smuggler Mine =

Silver mine in Colorado, United States

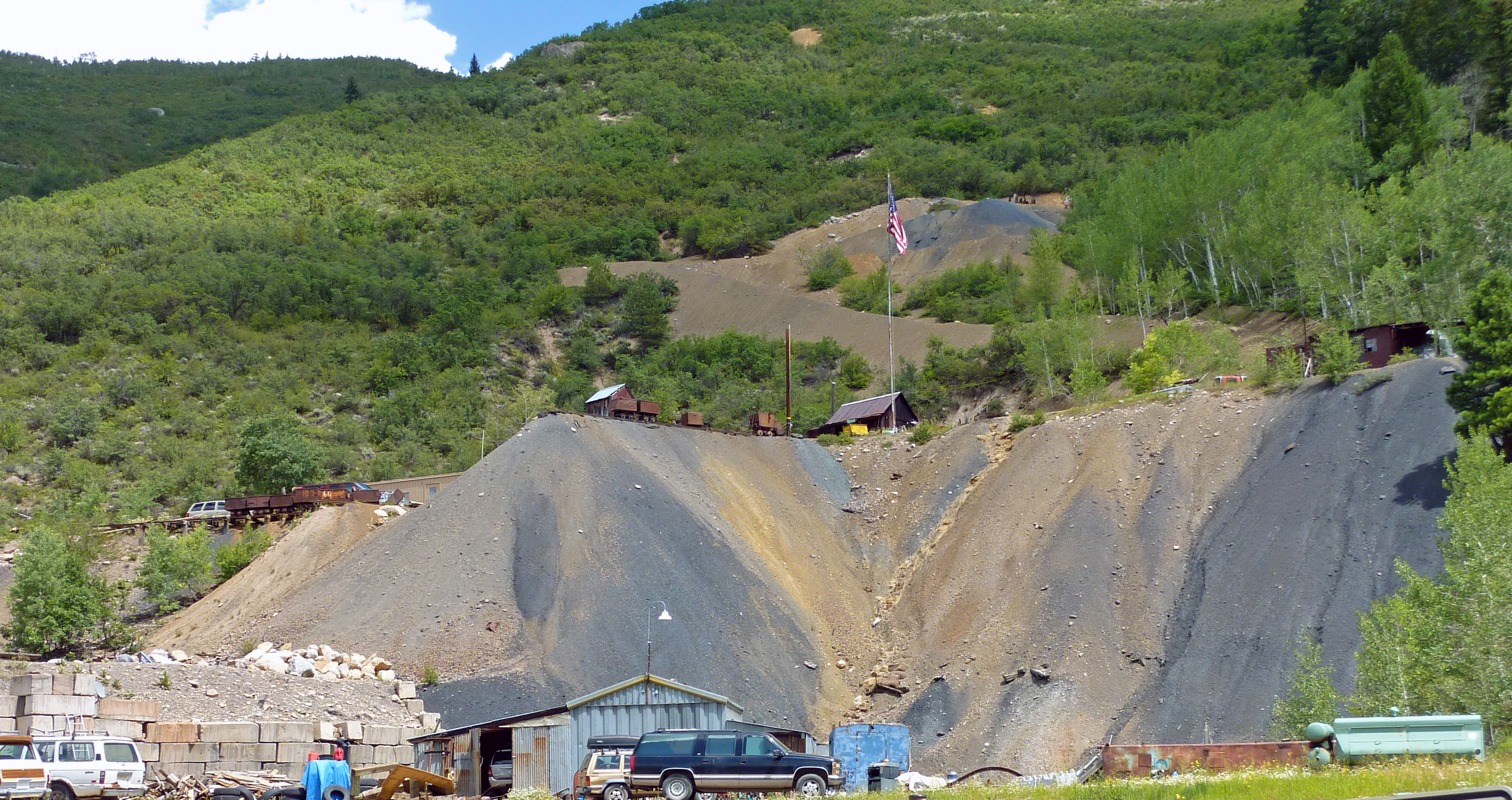
- Mine surface facilities and tailings piles, 2009

- Location within Colorado
- Location: Aspen, Colorado, USA; 39°11′33″N 106°48′23″W
- Products: Silver
- Opened: 1879
- Active: 1879–1918, 1970s-present
- Closed
- Smuggler Mine
- U.S. National Register of Historic Places
- Area: 9.7 acres (3.9 ha)
- MPS: Historic Resources of Aspen MRA, Mining Industry in Colorado
- NRHP reference No.: 87000194
- Added to NRHP: May 18, 1987
- Company: New Smuggler Mining Corp.

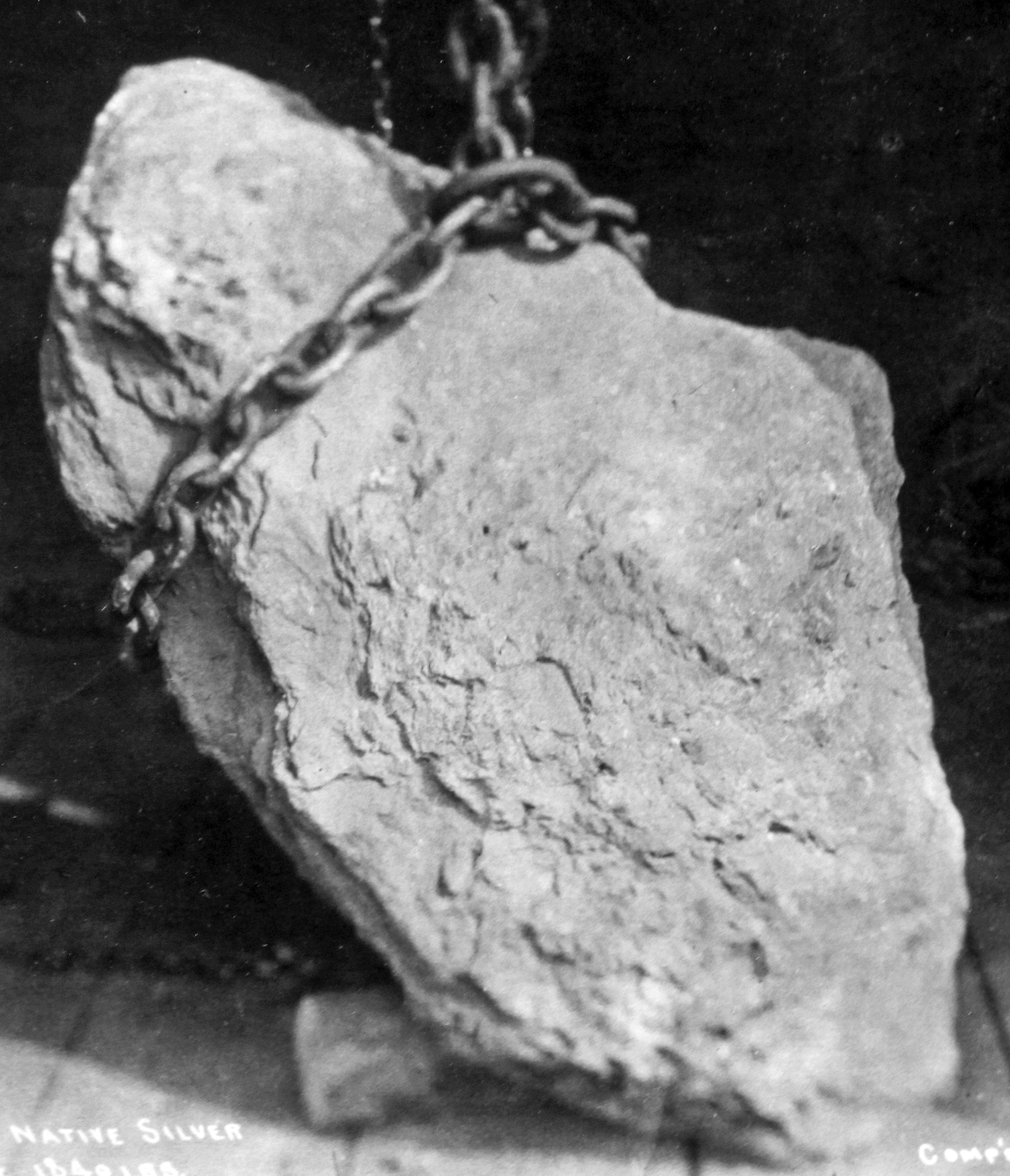
Largest nugget of native silver ever mined. Wt. 1840 lbs. Smuggler Mine Aspen Colo. 1894

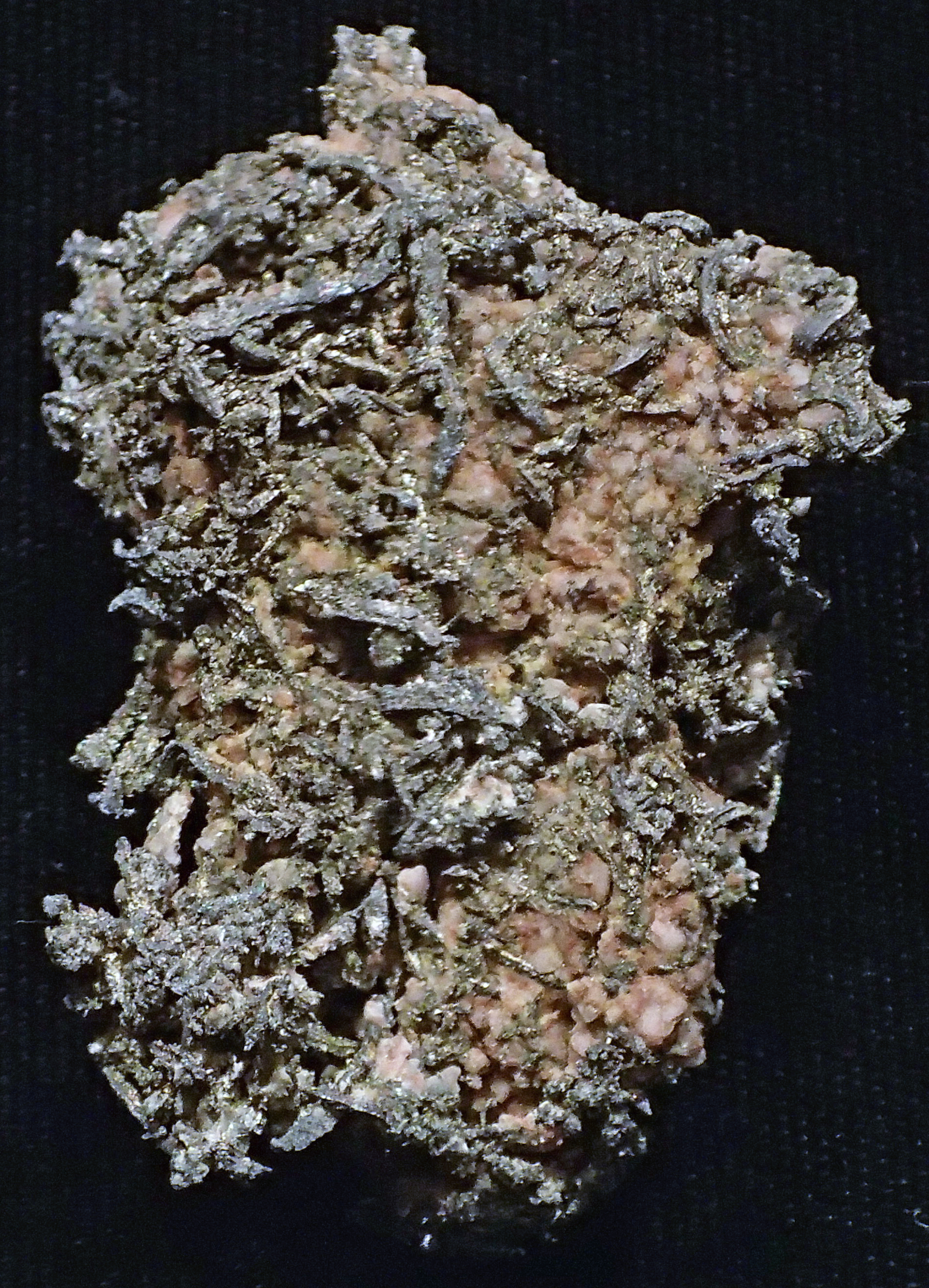
Native Silver wires on granite matrix, Smuggler Mine

The Smuggler Mine is located on the slopes of Smuggler Mountain, on the north edge of Aspen, Colorado, United States. It is the oldest operating silver mine in the Aspen mining district, and one of the few still operating from Aspen's early boom years. In 1987 it was listed on the National Register of Historic Places.

The largest silver nugget ever mined, weighing 2,340 pounds (1,060 kg), came from Smuggler. At its peak the mine was responsible for nearly one-fifth of the world's total silver output. Its extensive tunnel system reaches more than a thousand feet (300 m) below the entrance, extending under the city of Aspen, although most of the lower tunnels are presently flooded.

Smuggler was one of the few mines in the Aspen area to reopen after the 1893 repeal of the Sherman Silver Purchase Act. It continued producing ore until 1918, and was reopened in the 1970s. In 1984 it was designated a Superfund site after tests found high levels of lead and cadmium in the soil. It took the Environmental Protection Agency 12 years to clean up the site. While it is estimated that nearly a million pounds (400,000 kg) of recoverable ore remain in the mine, it is used as much for tours today as mining. In 2012 it and two nearby lots were put up for sale.

== Buildings and grounds ==
The mine's surface facilities are located in a 9.7-acre (3.9 ha) area enclosed by a chainlink fence off Smuggler Mountain Road (Pitkin County Route 21), on the northeast fringe of Aspen just outside city limits. It is at the base of Smuggler Mountain, at an elevation of 8,000 feet (2,400 m) above sea level. The slopes of the mountain, to the north and east, are intermittently wooded with scrubby evergreen trees, eventually becoming part of White River National Forest, with the shafts of other mines, now defunct, amongst the trees.

Silverlode Drive runs along the southwest, below the mine, leading to an area of large modern houses on the mine's northwest. Directly to the west, with some open space between them and Silverlode, are two rows of attached condominium-style units on Free Silver Court and Nicholas Lane. On the southwest, across Park Circle, are seven tennis courts, buffering a densely developed residential area on their west.

The mine property consists of a lower area at the foot of a large tailings pile, with a large circular unpaved road along which many vehicles and truck trailers are parked. A two-lane road curves around to the north to climb to a small complex of buildings uphill near a smaller tailings pile. Both piles are considered to be contributing resources to the mine's historic character.

At the base of the larger pile is a small corrugated metal building with a gabled roof and a smaller gabled wooden shed. A watchman's trailer is in the woods near the property's northwest corner. At the top is another corrugated metal building with a trailer attached to it and a wooden shed with a gabled roof. They are non-contributing, as is a modern reconstruction of an original wooden ore chute. Next to it is section of track with seven ore cars, two from the Smuggler and five from other mines of the Silver Boom era; they are contributing.

The entrance to the original Smuggler Shaft is fenced off just to the north of the base of the larger pile. The Clark Tunnel is near the upper tailings pile. Both are contributing, as are the sandstone blocks that remain from the foundation of the original gallows frame and house near the Clark. The two tunnels lead to 38 underground levels, half of which are flooded.

== History ==
Although prospectors were aware very early of Smuggler's potential, they were unable to fully exploit it for a variety of reasons until the late 1880s. When they did, it became wildly productive for a few years, until the Panic of 1893 ended the Colorado Silver Boom. The mine remained open, even as miners continued to leave Aspen, until closing in 1917.

=== 1879: Discovery ===
In the late 1870s, shortly after Colorado became a state, prospectors began crossing the Continental Divide at Independence Pass in search of silver deposits in the Roaring Fork Valley. Many set up their tents about ten miles (16 km) below the pass at the confluence of the Roaring Fork and its tributary Castle Creek, the first area they found suitable for large-scale settlement. It was called Ute City at first for the dominant local Native American tribe, but the prevalence of aspen trees in the forests soon gave it the name it has had ever since.

The first prospectors to find Smuggler, Edward Fuller and Con Allbright, are believed to have sold the claim very soon afterwards for necessary supplies. Details are few since they never officially filed the claim, but it is believed that they arrived in the area sometime during June 1879 from the south, along Maroon Creek. During a forest fire, they lost their blankets and, possibly, their mules. They found the camp of some other prospectors, who resupplied them, and then found what became Smuggler the next day. According to legend, they both sold their halves of the claim to the prospectors who had resupplied them, and then left the area, never to return.

According to legend, Allbright's price for his half included a mule, who supposedly died the next day. A variant has it that another, unnamed prospector discovered Smuggler while hunting deer when an errant shot revealed silver inside a rock he struck, and he sold the claim the next day for $50 and the ill-fated mule. This legend was reported as early as 1881, in the first issue of what has become The Aspen Times, although in that account the mule did not die so quickly.

It is equally unclear how the first recorded claimant, Charles Bennett, came into possession of Smuggler. One report says his party came across the claim around that same time, June 1879, and found it abandoned (which would suggest that prospectors were exploring the valley earlier than is commonly accepted today). This is unlikely because Fuller and Allbright's presence in the area is dated to the same time. Bennett may simply have considered the claim abandoned because it had not been fully developed, even though the required 60 days to file the claim had not yet passed. Bennett's account, in which it was he who named the claim "Smuggler", may be suspect as it omits mention of his partners.

=== 1880–1886: Early years ===
Bennett added to his mining claims a ranch on the area of the valley floor being used as a camp. In 1880 he sold them all to B. Clark Wheeler and Charles Hallam, who with their partners, among them David Hyman, the Cincinnati man who had first hired them to search for business opportunities in Colorado, formed the Aspen Town and Land Company to survey and plat the 282-acre (114 ha) of ranch land. They subdivided it, named the streets after themselves and sold the lots for $10 ($330 in modern dollars), an event which brought the city of Aspen into existence.

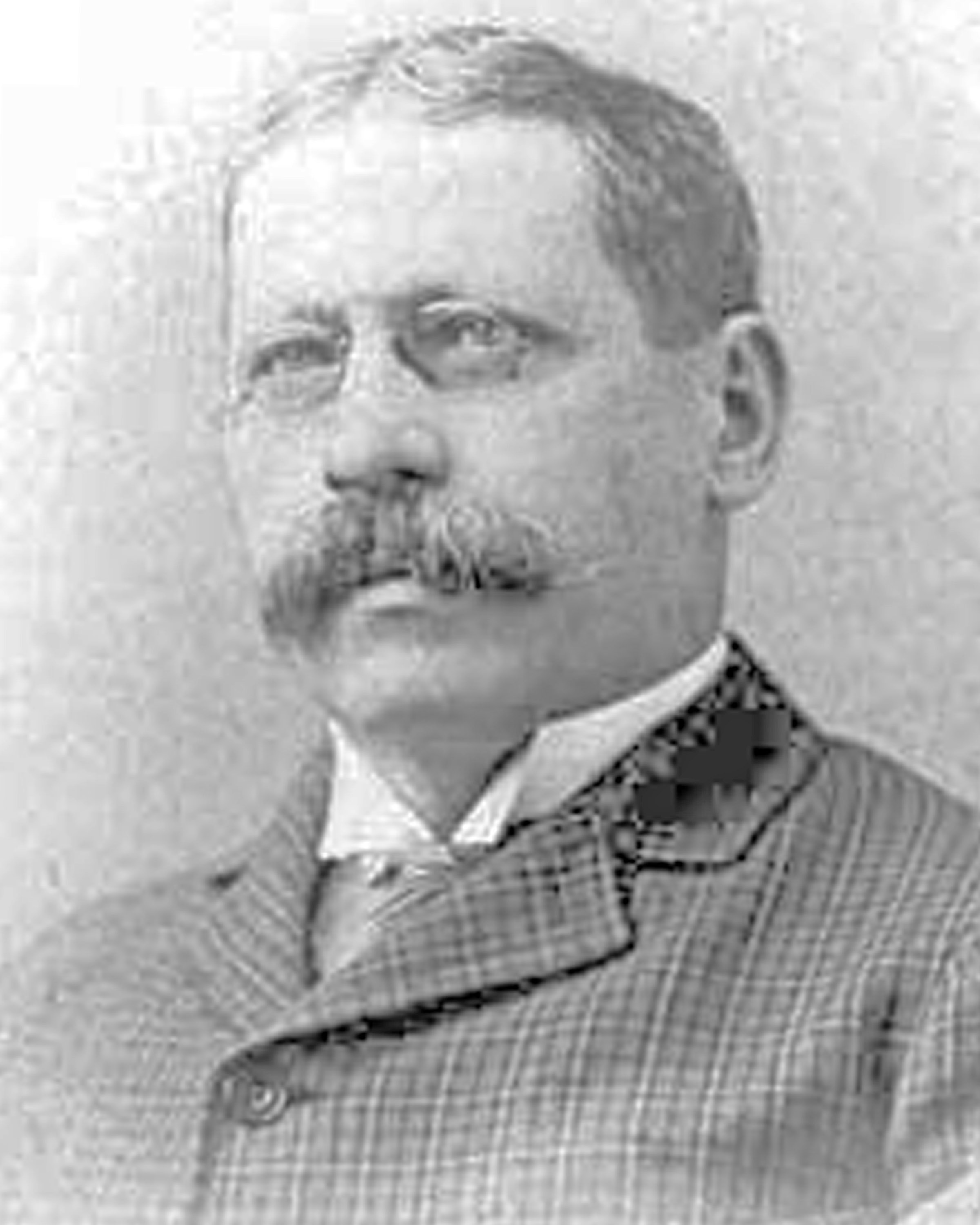
David Hyman

Hyman eventually assumed control of Smuggler and the neighboring Durant Mine. The vein of silver ore, so pure the silver was visible, that ran through both mines also went into mines owned by Jerome B. Wheeler. No relation to Hyman's former partner, Wheeler, at the time co-chairman of Macy's, had discovered Aspen and its opportunities in 1883, when he moved to Manitou Springs for his wife's health. In the late 1880s, Hyman and Wheeler sued each other over which of them owned the greater rights to the Smuggler node, a legal battle, which captivated the boomtown while tying up money that would otherwise have been used to develop the mines. Legal bills for both parties reached a combined $1.5 million ($53.8 million in modern dollars), and was settled with the opening of Compromise Mine high up the slopes of what is known today as Aspen Mountain).

=== 1887–1893: Boom years ===
Their legal differences aside, Hyman and Wheeler collaborated to bring the railroads to Aspen, increasing the value of their holdings and their profits, later in the decade. Smuggler went from a total of $12,414 ($445,000 in modern dollars) in production for the entire year of 1886 to $1,500 ($54,000 in modern dollars) in daily production four years later. The onetime legal adversaries would both leave their names on Register-listed buildings in Aspen from the era, the Hyman–Brand Building and Hotel Jerome, Wheeler Opera House and Wheeler–Stallard House respectively.

The passage of the Sherman Silver Purchase Act in 1890, increasing the federal government's required purchase of that metal, contributed considerably to the prosperity of the city, whose population reached its all-time peak that year at over 10,000. The new Compromise Mine produced $11 million ($394 million in modern dollars) of silver ore. Smuggler produced one-fifth of the world's silver. The mines also produced lead and zinc, as well as the coal that heated and lit the city in wintertime, at the price of covering it with a sulfurous haze. For a time in the early 1890s Aspen was producing even more silver than Leadville. Smuggler employed over 200 miners.

That prosperity came to an end in 1893. In the wake of that year's economic crisis, Congress repealed the Sherman Silver Purchase Act. With that, the price dropped, and many of Aspen's mines had to close. Smuggler ceased most operations and laid off 70 of its miners.

=== 1894–1917: Post-boom years ===
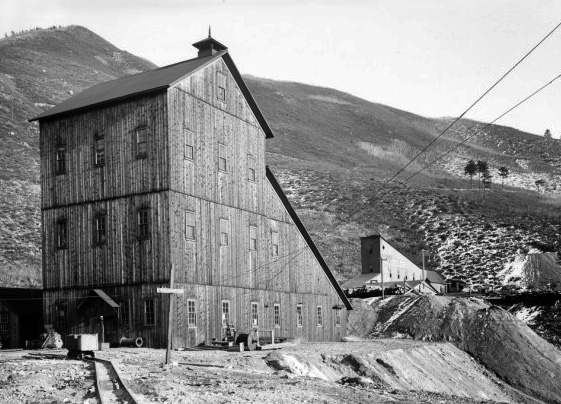
Smuggler Mine around the turn of the 20th century

At first it looked as if the bad times would be temporary. In 1894 the largest silver nugget ever was mined from Smuggler's depths. Originally, it weighed 2,340 pounds (1,060 kg), but was too large to be brought from the mine intact. It was broken into three pieces, the largest weighing 1,840 pounds (830 kg). The price of silver began to rise slightly in 1895, due to China's agreement to pay its reparations for the First Sino-Japanese War in that metal, at an amount larger than it was expected would be available on the international markets. In 1897 a fire caused the lower levels to flood. To get the pumps operating again, deep-sea divers were hired to go and repack them.

By 1900, business seemed to be improving. Smuggler produced about 250 short tons (230 t) of low-grade ore daily. It was not what it had been during the boom, but it was steady. Even after the price of silver dropped to even lower levels in 1902, the mine announced it would be doubling its workforce and leasing out two other, smaller, closed mines it owned. A local newspaper predicted "The Return of the Good Times" the following year.

But Aspen's mines never completely turned around. The flooding almost closed Smuggler down in summer 1904, and it took a group effort by all the mine owners to keep its pumps on and prevent it. As of 1905 300 miners were still working at Smuggler. But the city's population continued to decline, and at the 1910 census it was down to around 2,000, less than a half of what it had officially been during the boom's peak. In 1912 Smuggler's miners briefly went on strike over a wage cut to the timbermen and their helpers.

It was settled within two weeks, with a partial restoration of the reduction. While in its peak years the hard rock mining at Smuggler had been dangerous enough to kill a miner roughly once a month, and the miners had organized in response, becoming one of the founding locals of the Western Federation of Miners union, Smuggler and Aspen generally avoided the kind of violent labor unrest, such as the Ludlow massacre, that characterized such disputes elsewhere in the state during this period. The miners who had remained from the boom years were more solidly established in the community, and had an incentive to keep what had become Aspen's largest employer running. Therefore, they often worked closely with the mine owners toward that end.

More silver had been mined after 1893 than before, yet the industry could not sustain itself forever. In the years after the strike the cost of pumping out the mine cut into the Smuggler's profits and discouraged further investment. In 1917 Smuggler reached the bottom of the vein that had been the mine's main source of ore to that point. While there might have been other sources in the area that could have been worked, David Hyman decided to shut down the mine, as much because of a dispute over rates with the owner of the local electric utility as because of the shortage of ore.

Although Hyman continued to lease out the mine's upper levels to any willing concern, the effect of the mine's closure was economically disastrous for the community. The period since the boom's end in 1893 had become known as "the quiet years"; with Smuggler shut down, the 1920s, prosperous in much of the rest of the country, became quieter still. Many of the mine's original buildings either collapsed from neglect, or were dismantled for their building materials. Aside from the little mining remaining, there was only farming and ranching in the area. By 1930, less than a thousand people were living in Aspen.

=== 1918–present: Mining in a post-mining Aspen ===
Mining resumed at Smuggler after World War II as the city's decline finally reversed, but not because of the mine. In the late 1930s, some leftover mining equipment had been used to create the first primitive ski lift up crude trails on Aspen Mountain across the valley. After the war it had been replaced with Ski Lift No. 1, the longest chairlift in the world at that time. Its opening ceremony, in 1947, drew one of the state's U.S. senators and its governor-elect. The quiet years were over, and a new industry was replacing mining. The mine's original buildings had not survived the long years of neglect, so new buildings were constructed on the site after 1950 of wood and metal that was generally salvaged from other abandoned mines in the area. Timber taken from the demolished 1885 Kit Carson stage stop in the city was used to build the wooden shop at the top of the lower pile.

Aspen continued to grow again, becoming a popular destination for corporate executives and celebrities through the 1960s and '70s. In 1981 soil samples taken by a college student doing a study of soil nutrients showed elevated levels of lead and cadmium on the mountain. As these were hazardous waste from the mining operations in the area, the federal Environmental Protection Agency (EPA) was notified and mining stopped pending its investigation. The following year Hyman's descendants sold the mine's operating rights to Stefan Albouy, a mining enthusiast who hoped to make it productive and profitable again. He instituted a tradition of firing a cannon from the mine at 6 a.m. every Independence Day (July 4), continuing a similar tradition from the earlier mining era where explosives would be set off at that time. It is sometimes discharged on other special occasions, such as touchdowns scored by the high school football team.

During the next two years the EPA, in conjunction with the developer of the nearby Hunter Creek Condominiums, took further samples of the affected soil. It began a feasibility study for possible remediation efforts. In 1986, over the strenuous objection of many local residents, it added the mine and mountain to its National Priorities List (NPL), making it eligible for cleanup under the Superfund program.

Despite the ongoing cleanup efforts, in which the EPA eventually removed soil from the area, Albouy was able to restore the mine to functionality, but he and his partners struggled financially. Silver was trading at even lower levels than it had earlier in the century, and he was rarely able to turn a profit. The mine had to run tours. He later acquired Compromise as well, and after some battles with the county was able to operate it and run tours there as well.

Frustrated with how his plans had largely failed, Albouy killed himself in 1992. The mine was later acquired by two of Albouy's partners, Aspen natives Chris Preusch and Jay Parker. Honoring his wish, they formed the New Smuggler Mining Corporation and continued mining and guiding tours.

In 1999, the EPA judged the remediation successful and removed the mine and mountain from the NPL. It continues to monitor the situation, producing reports every five years. Thirteen years later, in 2012, Parker and Preusch were forced by the majority of shareholders to put the mine up for sale, listing it with Sotheby's for $9.5 million. A new owner has the option of continuing to operate the mine, which is estimated to contain 890,000 pounds (400,000 kg) of recoverable silver, or shutting it down for good. Should it choose the latter, New Smuggler has posted a bond for the cleanup of the site.

== See also ==
- List of Superfund sites in Colorado
- National Register of Historic Places listings in Pitkin County, Colorado
