= Wheeler–Stallard House =

Historic house in Colorado, United States

- U.S. National Register of Historic Places
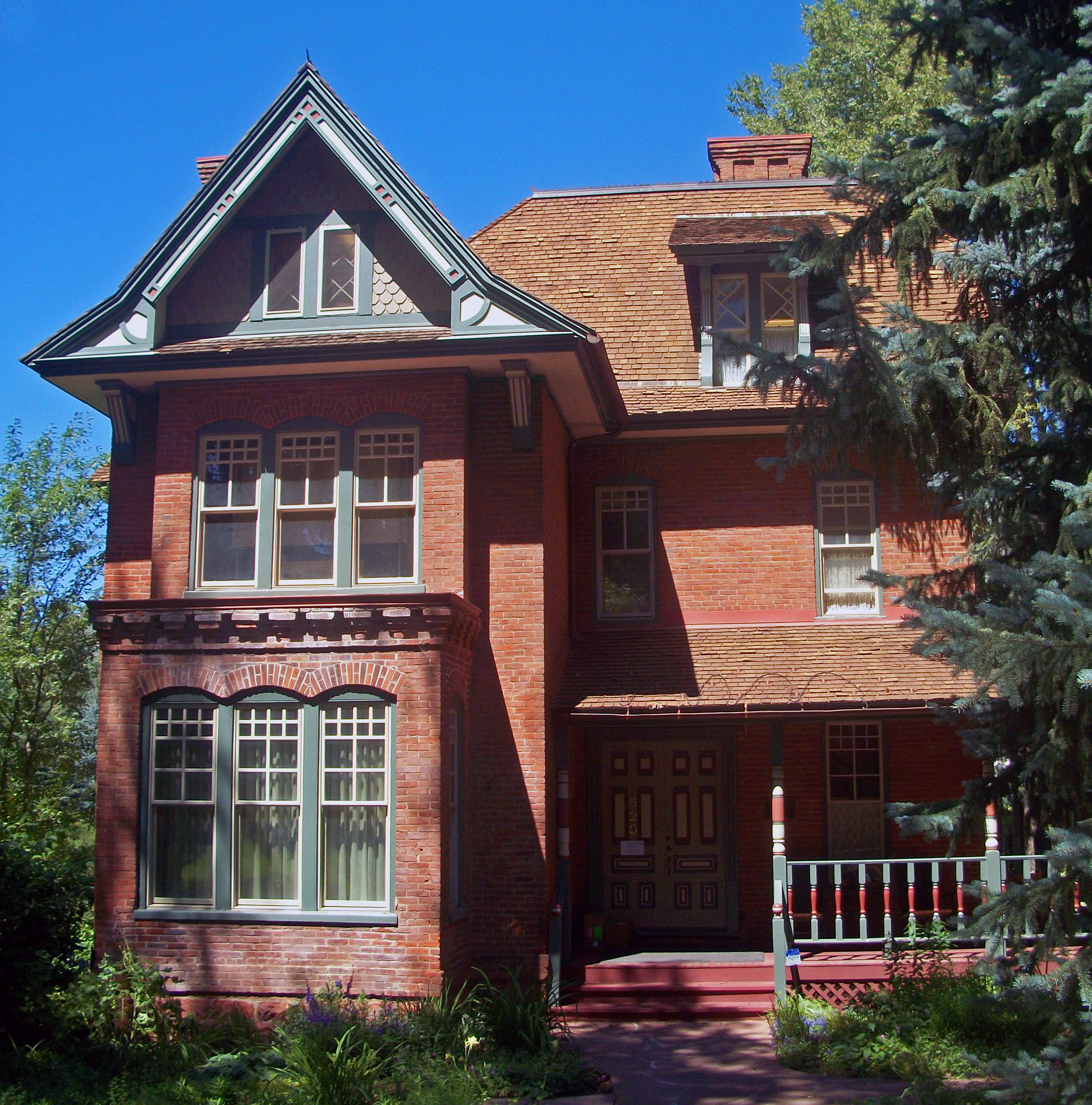
- South elevation, 2010

- Location within Colorado Location within the United States
- Location: Aspen, CO
- Coordinates: 39°11′37″N 106°49′44″W
- Built: 1888
- Architectural style: Queen Anne
- NRHP reference No.: 75000532
- Added to NRHP: May 30, 1975

The Wheeler–Stallard House is located on West Bleeker Street in Aspen, Colorado, United States. It is an 1880s brick structure built in the Queen Anne architectural style, and renovated twice in the 20th century. In 1975 it was listed on the National Register of Historic Places.

It was built by Jerome B. Wheeler, an early investor in Aspen's silver mines during its boomtown years. He and two wealthy tenants rarely spent much time in the house before the Colorado Silver Boom ended in 1893. After a decade of vacancy, it became the home of the Stallard family for much of the early 20th century, the "quiet years" when Aspen's economy was depressed and its remaining residents struggled to make a living.

After World War II it was bought by Walter Paepcke, who like Wheeler came to visit Aspen and invested heavily in its development, leading to the city becoming a cultural center and upscale ski resort. He never lived there himself, and it eventually became the residence of Alvin C. Eurich during his tenure as Aspen Institute president. Since the late 1960s it has been the home of the Aspen Historical Society, which operates it partially as a historic house museum.

== Buildings and grounds ==
The house and its lot take up most of the north side of the block of West Bleeker between North Fifth, North Sixth and West Hallam streets in Aspen's residential West End. Main Street, part of State Highway 82, the only through road to and from the city, is a block to the south. One block further south the level terrain gives way to the slopes of Aspen Mountain There is a detached garage and parking lot in the rear.

The building itself is a three-story structure of brick on a stone foundation laid in common bond with wooden trim. The cross-gabled roof has a shed-roofed dormer window on the south face; the west gable ends in a jerkin roof and the other three have projecting central sections. Three tall fluted brick chimneys rise from the sides. The first story of the south (front) elevation has a projecting flat-roofed bay window on the west; a pent-roofed balustraded porch begins on the east and wraps around that entire elevation.

External image
- View of west elevation

All windows on the lower two stories are double-hung sash with an unusual twelve-over-one pattern. The upper two panes of a six-over-one are further divided by muntins into four smaller panes each. They are set underneath splayed brick arched lintels. On the gables they are double windows; except for the south gable which has triple windows on both stories.

The roofline of the projecting bay on the south has a cornice topped with corbeled brickwork. The gables likewise are set off from the lower stories by a projecting flared roof supported by elaborate wooden brackets. The gable roofline is lined with paneled bargeboards. Recessed within are two casement windows with diamond patterns in a scalloped face. Similar windows are within the dormer as well.

Paneled double wooden doors open into a small lobby, with a closet on the side and stairs leading up in the southeast corner. The original summer kitchen is to the rear. To the west is the living room, with the dining room and kitchen behind it. All the rooms on the second story were originally bedrooms. The attic has been divided into rooms as well. They are furnished in a manner that as close as possible replicates how they might have originally been furnished around 1890.

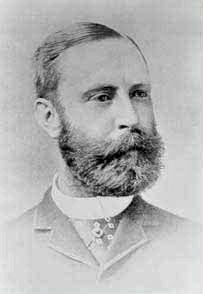
Jerome Wheeler

== History ==
The house's history has roughly four periods: its early years after Wheeler built it, during which it was never occupied by its residents for a long period and later fell vacant when the city's economy faltered; the Stallard family's occupancy and later ownership in the first half of the 20th century, Aspen's "quiet years"; Walter Paepcke's ownership in the years after World War II; and its present ownership by the historical society.

=== 1889–92: Construction and Wheeler years ===
Jerome B. Wheeler, then the minority partner in the Macy's department store chain, first visited Aspen in 1883. The rapidly growing community had not existed a decade earlier, and had only incorporated as a city four years earlier. The silver miners who were its earliest settlers looked to someone like Wheeler as the kind of Eastern investor who could make it practical to extract the extensive silver deposits in the surrounding mountains—at the time, it was necessary to haul any significant amounts of ore over the Continental Divide at Independence Pass to Leadville, where the nearest smelter was, via mule train.

Wheeler invested heavily in building a smelter in Aspen, and bringing a railroad connection to the city, while spending the summers in Manitou Springs. He built two of downtown Aspen's main landmarks, the Wheeler Opera House and Hotel Jerome. It appears that he began planning to build a permanent residence in the city as early as 1886, when he bought the tracts of land where the house now stands.

It is unclear what year the house was built, or who the architect was. The year of construction most often claimed is 1888. It is unlikely to have been built earlier, since Wheeler would have not likely built anything before he bought the rights to build over a city-owned easement for an alley across the middle of the block in 1887 (at the time it was built, it was the only house in Aspen with an entire block to itself. There is no record of the house existing before 1890, when Wheeler made his first property tax payment on it and two extant photographs were taken, so it is entirely possible that 1889 was the true year of construction.

Denver-based architects Frederick A. Hale and William Quayle have both been suggested as the architect. Both built major buildings in the city—Hale the Aspen Community Church and the Aspen and Cowenhoven blocks downtown, and Quayle the Pitkin County Courthouse respectively—during the time period. An undated history of the house in the historical society's collection attributes the building to Hale; this is the only known attribution of the house to any architect. No newspaper accounts or other records from the late 1880s suggest Quayle and Wheeler had any contact during the courthouse construction, or that Hale was even in Aspen at that time.

Around this time Wheeler retired from Macy's, possibly as a result of a power struggle with majority partner Charles Webster, allowing him to devote his full attention to his interests in the Colorado mountains. Since Aspen was conveniently located to most of them, he had intended for the new house there to become the family's permanent home. Local legend holds that Harriet Wheeler never visited Aspen, either because of her health or a supposed dislike for the mountains. However, newspaper accounts state that the Wheelers, including Harriet, did make several short visits to Aspen in 1888–89, during which they may well have spent their nights at the house if it was complete.

The Wheelers would instead take up full-time residence in Windermere, another mansion they were building in Manitou Springs. Jerome Wheeler instead rented it in 1889 to James Henry Devereux, a former manager of his Aspen mining company who had since become an officer of the local electric utility, among his own other business interests around the state. He and his family lived in the house intermittently and then moved to their own permanent Aspen home in 1890.

They were replaced very soon by Henry Woodward, who had briefly managed the opera house for Wheeler. By 1890 he had become Wheeler's general agent for Colorado, managing all his employer's interests in the state. Woodward eventually became vice president of Wheeler's Aspen bank as well, and he and his wife were prominent in the city's social life, hosting parties at the house. They, like the Wheelers and Devereuxs, often took extended visits away from it as well.

One of those extended vacations led to the Woodwards' departure from the house. In 1892 they went to Cuba, ostensibly for the warmer climate, and did not return for at least four months. Woodward may also have been seeking to avoid criminal prosecution for possible illegal acts on Wheeler's behalf during litigation between his employer and a former partner. After Woodward's return, he remained Wheeler's agent but moved into a new house on West Hallam Street.

Instead of finding a new tenant, Wheeler eventually sold the property to his mother-in-law. He eventually liquidated most of his Aspen interests over the course of 1892, both to pay off debts and legal judgements against him, and because he may have been concerned by drops in the price of silver. He did not liquidate enough to protect himself from the severe setbacks he incurred the following year, when the Panic of 1893 struck and, as a result, Congress repealed the Sherman Silver Purchase Act which had kept the Colorado mines in business. Wheeler's mining company laid off all its employees, and his banks closed for two years. He rarely visited Aspen after that, and spent most of his time in Windermere, the Manitou Springs house, until his death in 1918.

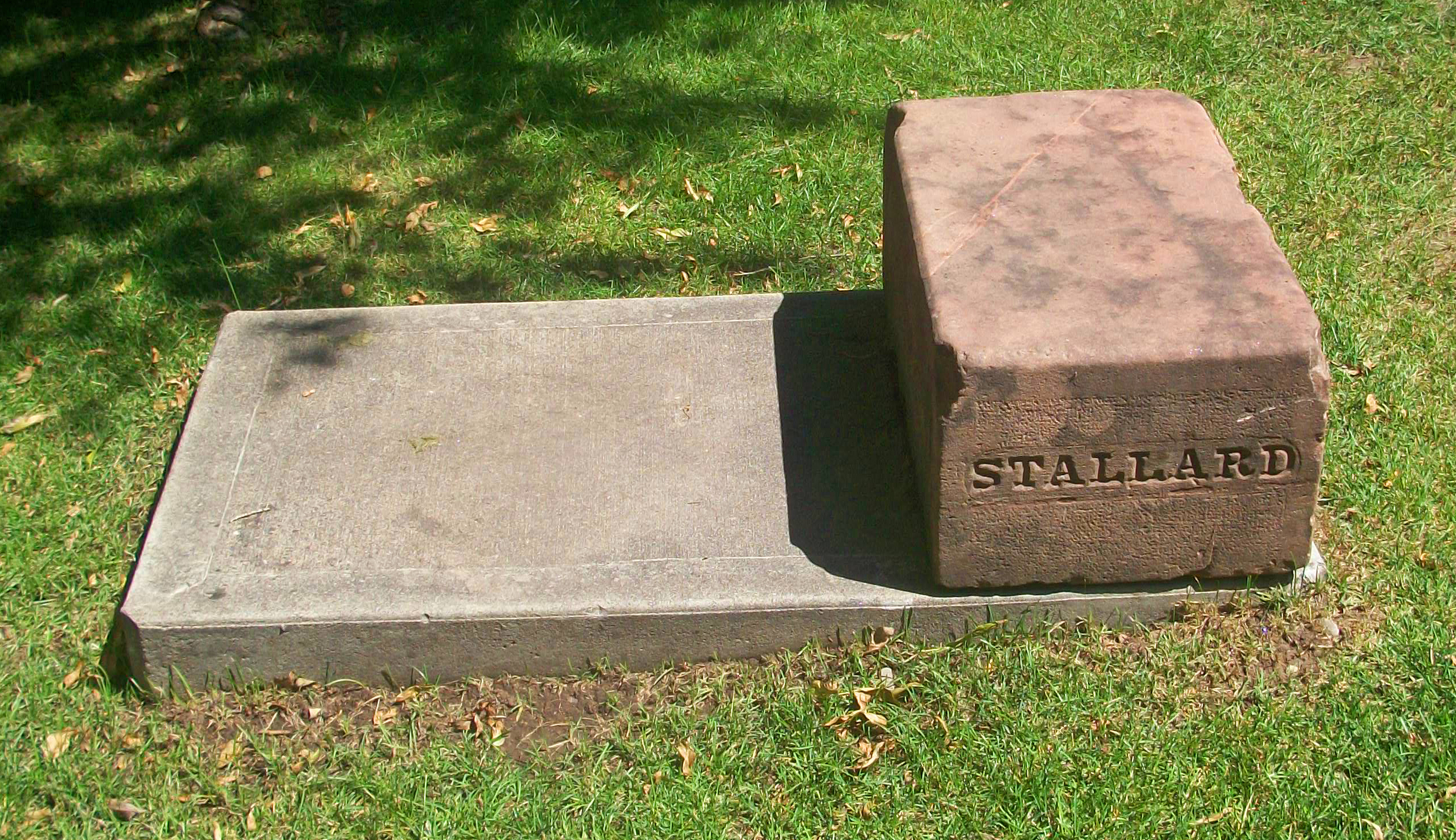
Mounting block with Stallard name in front of house

=== 1893–1945: Stallards and quiet years ===
There is no record of anyone living in the house in the years immediately following the crash. This was the beginning of a half-century of Aspen's history referred to as "the quiet years", during which the collapse of the mining industry and ensuing economic contraction led to a steady population decline. At its nadir, in 1930, around 500 lived in a city which had once been home to over 10,000.

Wheeler's mother-in-law in turn sold the house to a fellow New Yorker, Christopher Bell, for $5,000 ($194,000 in modern dollars), a quarter of what she had paid for it, along with the Wheeler Opera House. He was a frequent business partner and lender to Wheeler in those years, and buying some of his now-toxic assets at prices well above their minimal market value may have been a way to help the Wheeler family out financially without loaning them more money. Bell does not appear to have ever visited Aspen before his death in 1902.

His will bequeathed the Aspen properties to his youngest son Dennistoun. In 1905 he allowed Edgar Stallard, a local real estate agent who had become manager of the opera house the year before, to move into the house in return for services rendered, according to his descendants. One of them recalled in an interview years later that the house was severely neglected, as were many buildings from Aspen's boom years, when they moved in, further suggesting that no one had lived there since the Woodwards.

The Stallards became the first true residents of the house, in the process changing how it was used. Unlike the Wheelers, Devereuxs or Woodwards, they could not afford servants, so the rooms set aside for them instead became the bedrooms for their children and, after 1908, two nieces of Mary Ella Stallard they took in after her sister died. Edgar, who had done business in Aspen since 1889, had been relatively prosperous since the crash, managing and renting properties for newly absentee owners who had left town, but even though he was agent for the Hotel Jerome as well, his income was not enough to support the family. Mary Ella supplemented it with subsistence farming, growing vegetables on a rear garden and ranching a plot of land outside of town to feed the family's animals, chores in which she was assisted by the Stallard sons when they grew old enough. Surplus milk and eggs were sold to other Aspenites. She also maintained a small photographic studio in the house, and refused to charge for the pictures she took of neighbors. The house, once a showplace for affluence, became a workplace as much as a residence.

One major difficulty was the impracticality of heating a house designed with wealthy and frequently absent occupants in mind through the severe winters of a mountain town almost 8,000 feet (2,400 m) in elevation. The family added a coal shed, a feature no previous occupant had needed, on the north (rear) elevation. Franklin stoves replaced the fireplaces, now boarded at the flue to prevent heat loss. Cottonwoods planted around the block were gradually felled for firewood.

In 1908 ownership defaulted to the county as a result of the Bells' failure to pay taxes on it. Two years later, the county put it up for sale at auction. In a depressed market with many vacant properties, it did not sell until a rancher bought it for $150 ($4,000 in modern dollars). He then sold it to Mary Ella Stallard at cost. For the first time since 1888 the house was owner-occupied.

Not long after the Stallards became homeowners, their lives were again beset by adversity. In 1919 the last of the major silver mines around Aspen closed down. Edgar closed his real estate business and took a job as a deputy assessor for the county at much lower pay. That summer, the Stallards' youngest son, Albert, died at the age of 12 of diphtheria. His mother was consumed by grief, and according to relatives never quite got over it. She nevertheless took in three of her grandnieces, who had lost their own mother to the 1918 flu pandemic and were not getting along with their stepmother, in 1921.

The three girls helped around the house as much as their mother and aunts had. This became especially necessary when Edgar Stallard died of chronic lung disease in 1925. She inherited some property and jewelry from him, but saved them for future use, and continued to subsist until the grandnieces had grown up and moved out by the late 1930s. To save money on heating, she closed off the upper floors, used the dining room as her bedroom and the small winter kitchen as the only kitchen.

By 1945 she had realized the house was too big for her, and moved to a smaller house on Main Street. That year she sold the house to William Tagert, who had long owned a feed store in the city. He immediately sold it to a visiting businessman from Chicago named Walter Paepcke.

=== 1945–69: Paepcke years ===
Like Jerome Wheeler, Paepcke was a wealthy and successful head of a major corporation (Container Corporation of America) who visited Aspen while vacationing elsewhere in Colorado. He and his wife Elizabeth, both avid supporters of the arts, had been looking for an American location for a classical music festival similar to the Salzburg Festival in Austria. Aspen's mountain setting was ideal, but the city's many derelict buildings were a problem. The couple was convinced that, if restored their Victorian charm would make Aspen a place visitors would want to return to.

They bought 18 properties around the city, including the house, and commissioned Bauhaus architect Herbert Bayer to help renovate them. Paepcke also made the acquaintance of Fritz Pferdl and several other veterans of the U.S. Army's Tenth Mountain Division who had begun developing downhill ski trails on Aspen Mountain before the war. He formed the Aspen Skiing Company with them, and in 1947 they built and opened Ski Lift No. 1, then the longest ski lift in the world,. an event considered to have ended the quiet years and begun the development of Aspen into the upscale resort town it is today.

Skiing and the Aspen Music Festival, begun to commemorate the bicentennial of Johann Wolfgang von Goethe in 1949, began attracting visitors to the city. The Hotel Jerome, then the only one in the city, could not always accommodate them, and the Paepckes used the large houses in the West End when they had overflow. Elizabeth Paepcke, herself trained as a designer and architect, not only oversaw the renovation of the Wheeler–Stallard House but did some of the work herself, including ripping out some of the original wall plaster and replacing it with drywall, partitioning and finishing the attic and replacing some of the fireplace mantels. The interior layout may have been altered during this time, possibly with the closure of the entrance to the servants' stairs in the rear and the entry to the backroom from the foyer and the addition of another bathroom on the first floor.

By 1952 the house was regularly housing visiting skiers, who slept in all the bedrooms save those on the attic under the gables. They had free run of the house, but rarely used its kitchens, instead going out to eat at the Jerome or Red Onion, the only restaurant in Aspen to have stayed open from the boom years. Maids from the hotel cleaned it and made the beds while the guests were on the slopes. Among them were Dan Holly, inventor of the first metallic ski.

Within four years, other lodging had opened in the city and the guesthouses were less necessary. By 1956 the Wheeler–Stallard, like the other West End houses owned by the Paepckes, were instead used as employee housing. Henri Cashid, chef at the Jerome, lived there with his wife starting that year. The upstairs bedrooms were also used to house the hotel's waitresses. The hotel installed a communal phone in the foyer there so the waitresses could better communicate with their superiors about their work schedules.

Aspen benefited from other initiatives of the Paepckes during this period. The Aspen Institute, a product of the Goethe bicentennial, began to focus more on larger global issues. Beginning in 1951, its annual Executive Seminar had drawn some of the nation's top executives to the city. In 1963, two years after Walter Paepcke died, the house became the home of Alvin Eurich, the institute's first president, as an employment benefit.

As part of that process, Elizabeth Paepcke oversaw another renovation of the house, primarily focused on its structural system. The basement, she told an interviewer later, had severe deficiencies. "You could see daylight four ways through the stone," she said. "[C]an you imagine what happened in winter? Everything froze up, all the pipes and everything. They were always renewing the pipes and never repairing the basement."

Other changes made during this period including removing the section of porch that wrapped around the north elevation, supposedly requested by Eurich and his wife, and the current decoration on the first floor. The Institute reimbursed her for not only the $38,000 ($400,000 in modern dollars) the effort cost her but the Paepckes' original expenditure in purchasing the property. In return it received the right to use the property as a residence for its president, although it was still owned by Walter Paepcke's life insurance trust.

Eurich, his wife Nell and their children (who both attended boarding schools and were rarely in Aspen) took up residence in the house in 1964. It became their primary home, and Nell Eurich converted the attic space into a study. In 1966, they began hosting the opening cocktail parties of the institute's summer programs at their home, to give participants an experience of Aspen beyond the Meadows complex it occupies. The following year, Eurich resigned as president to become a trustee of the institute and devote more energy to fundraising. His wife became dean of Vassar College, and the couple moved to their New York apartment.

They were the last real residents of the house. William Stevenson, who served as interim president of the institute for two years, never lived there. His successor, Joseph Slater, moved the institute's headquarters to New York in 1968, making the house unnecessary as a residence for the institute's president.

=== 1969–present: Historical society ===
This time the house's vacancy was short-lived. The Aspen Historical Society, founded in 1963, had previously exhibited in City Hall and the Wheeler Opera House, with no permanent home. It quickly leased the house from the institute and opened it as a museum in 1969. Within a few months, it had raised the money to buy the house for $140,000 ($1,229,000 in modern dollars) and by the end of the year it owned the property.

By the 1970s Aspen had become a popular getaway for affluent celebrities and business executives. The society was able to raise considerable money from the community. In 1976 it built the "carriage house" to serve as an archive for its collections, to the north, with a driveway on Hallam Street. This was the last major change to the property, and the only outbuilding it has ever had.

In 2000 the society began a third set of renovations to make the house a better museum space. They were finished a year later. Since the society expected that at some future point it would use the space as a historic house museum, all the interior furnishings were retained. Outside, the picket fence was removed and the gardens redesigned to create a more open public space for the weddings and other events the society rents its grounds for. After the renovations, it opened its "Spirit of Aspen" exhibit. It closed in 2006 but can still be viewed online.

== See also ==
- National Register of Historic Places listings in Pitkin County, Colorado
