= Hotel Jerome =

Historic hotel in Aspen, Colorado

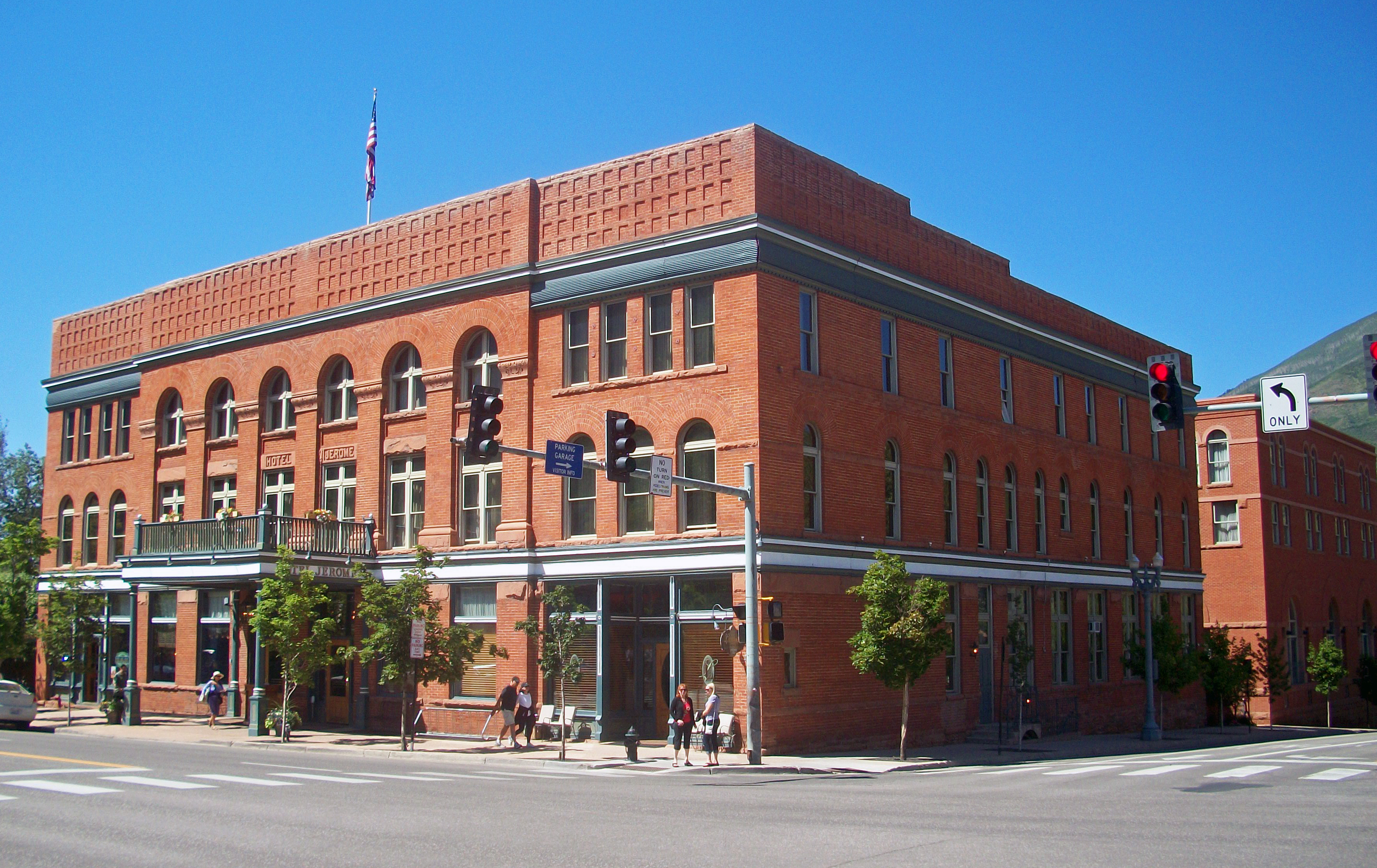
- South elevation and east profile, 2010
- Interactive map of the Hotel Jerome area

General information
- Location: Aspen, CO, U.S., 330 E. Main St.
- Coordinates: 39°11′27″N 106°49′9″W
- Opening: 1889
- Cost: $150,000
- Operator: Auberge Collection

Technical details
- Floor count: 3

Design and construction
- Developer: Jerome B. Wheeler

Other information
- Number of rooms: 94
- Number of restaurants: 3

Website
- auberge.com/hotel-jerome/

The Hotel Jerome is located on East Main Street (State Highway 82) in Aspen, Colorado, United States. It is a brick structure built in the 1880s that is often described as one of the city's major landmarks, its "crown jewel". In 1986, it was listed on the National Register of Historic Places. It is operated by Auberge Collection.

It was built by Jerome B. Wheeler, then co-owner of Macy's and a major investor in Aspen during its early boom years. He wanted the city to have a hotel that equaled European ones in its refinements and amenities. It was one of the first buildings west of the Mississippi to have full electric lighting and it has the only above-ground ballroom in Aspen. It was the only hotel to remain open through the city's "quiet years" in the early 20th century, as a family business run by a former bartender and his son that often served as the town's social center.

During Prohibition, a celebrated spiked drink, the Aspen Crud, was invented at its J-Bar. Later, the drink and bar became popular with members of the Tenth Mountain Division while they trained in the area. After the war, Aspen and its new ski resort became a popular destination for celebrities vacationing there. Gary Cooper and John Wayne often stayed at the Jerome, and it became known as a place where they and the locals freely mingled. Hunter S. Thompson used the J-Bar as his de facto office; later the hotel ballroom hosted his memorial service. Bill Murray partied there while portraying Thompson in a film, and the J-Bar also inspired a song by Glenn Frey, who often went there with his bandmates while a member of The Eagles.

== Building ==
The Jerome occupies a 1.1-acre (4,500 m^{2}) lot on the northwest corner of the North Mill Street intersection. The neighborhood is densely developed with many other commercial properties. Some of them, such as the Pitkin County Courthouse two blocks to the east, Aspen City Hall to the southeast, Collins Block and Wheeler Opera House to the south along Mill Street, have been listed on the Register themselves. At the opposite end of the block, across the street, is the Thomas Hynes House, a former miner's cottage now used as a restaurant and also on the Register. To the north, the terrain, level between the hotel and the slopes of Aspen Mountain, begins to slope gently toward the Roaring Fork River, which flows through Rio Grande Park two blocks to the north.

The building itself is a three-story 12-by-11-bay brick structure, with a small hyphen connecting the main block to a north wing of similar shape and size. Both are topped by a flat roof. The slight grade to the north exposes their basements slightly. Jerome B. Wheeler built it in 1889 during Colorado's silver boom, and it was designed to emulate the grand European hotels of the period.

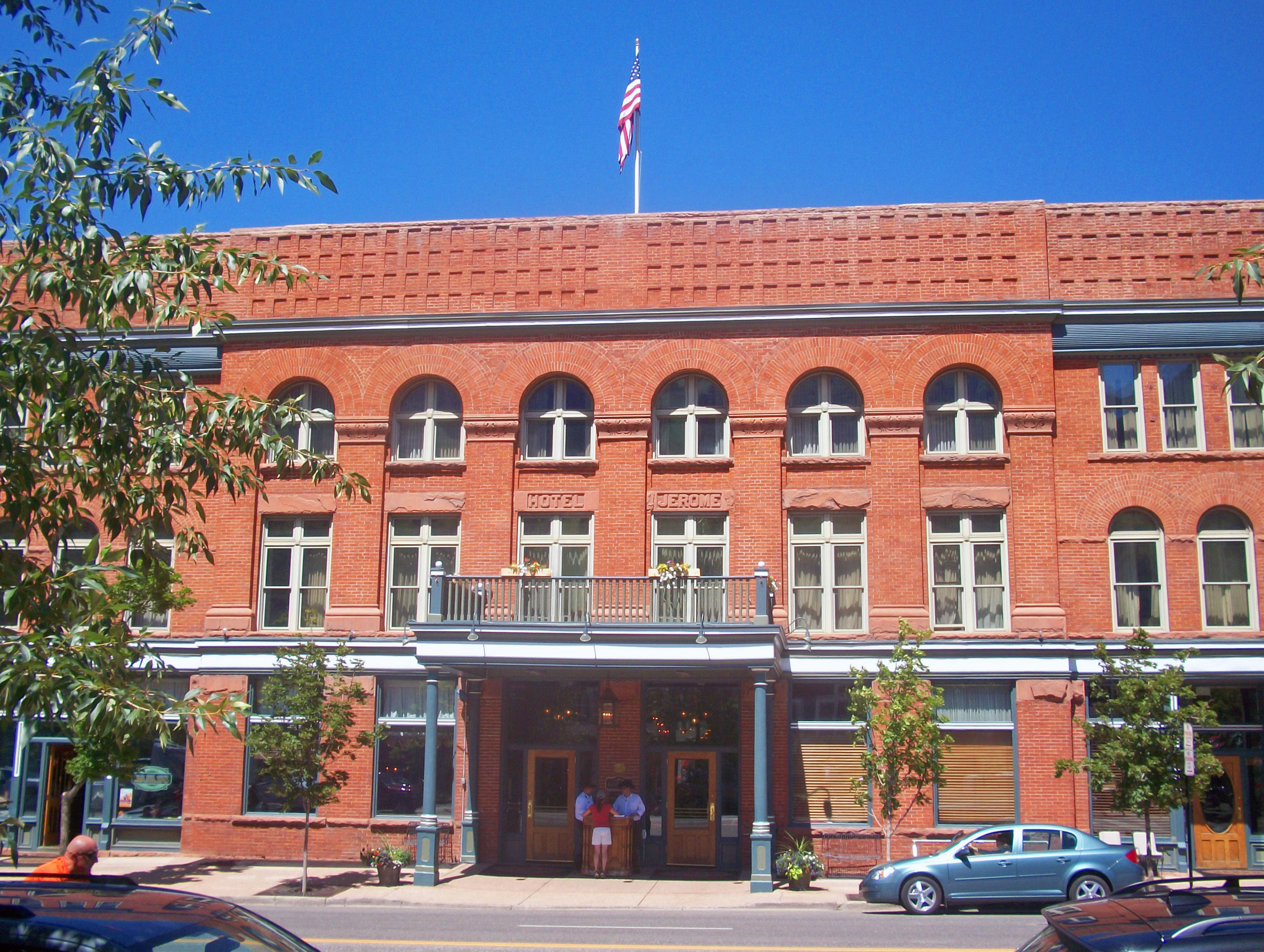
South facade detail

Its south (front) facade has a wooden hood, topped with a balcony balustraded in turned wooden spindles and supported by narrow iron columns, covering the sidewalk at the centrally located recessed main entrance. It is flanked by two small aspen trees on either side of the street. Smooth round columns on square bases support a molded cornice with metal letters spelling "Hotel Jerome" on the east and west.

The middle six bays of the facade project slightly, separated by pilasters with foliated caps, forming a tall arcade. On either side of the front entrance are large windows with a small rectangular pane atop a larger one. All have sills of locally quarried rough-cut peachblow sandstone, which continues around the building as a stringcourse and water table. Sandstone also forms a frieze, interrupted by the windows, below the molded tin cornice. At the ends of the facade are wood and glass storefronts, housing two of the hotel's three restaurants, the J-Bar on the west and Library on the east.

Windows on the second story's central projection are one-over-one double-hung sash windows with transoms and sandstone sills and lintels. In the middle two, the words "Hotel" and "Jerome" are carved. They are slightly recessed between brick pilasters with sandstone bases and capitals with decorative carvings. On the flanks, the windows are set in round segmental arches laid with several rows of splayed brick and topped with brick voussoirs. They, too, have sandstone sills, and a sandstone course runs around the building at the arches' springline.

At the third story, the four-pane center windows, also recessed, have a similar round-arched treatment as the flanking second-story windows. On the sides are four one-over-one sash windows with sandstone sills and small decorations between them. At the lintel is a dentilled, fluted wooden frieze that continues around the entire building except the front portico. Above it is a ridged metal convex cornice that marks the roofline. It is topped by a parapet with four rows of recessed square panels. A flagpole is located in the center of the roof at the front.

The east face has a similar, more restrained treatment, with the sandstone trim, stringcourses, cornices, and fenestration. On the west side, there is little decoration other than the segmental splayed-brick arches on the windows. The brick annex on the north side is non-contributing, as it was not part of the original building.

Interiors

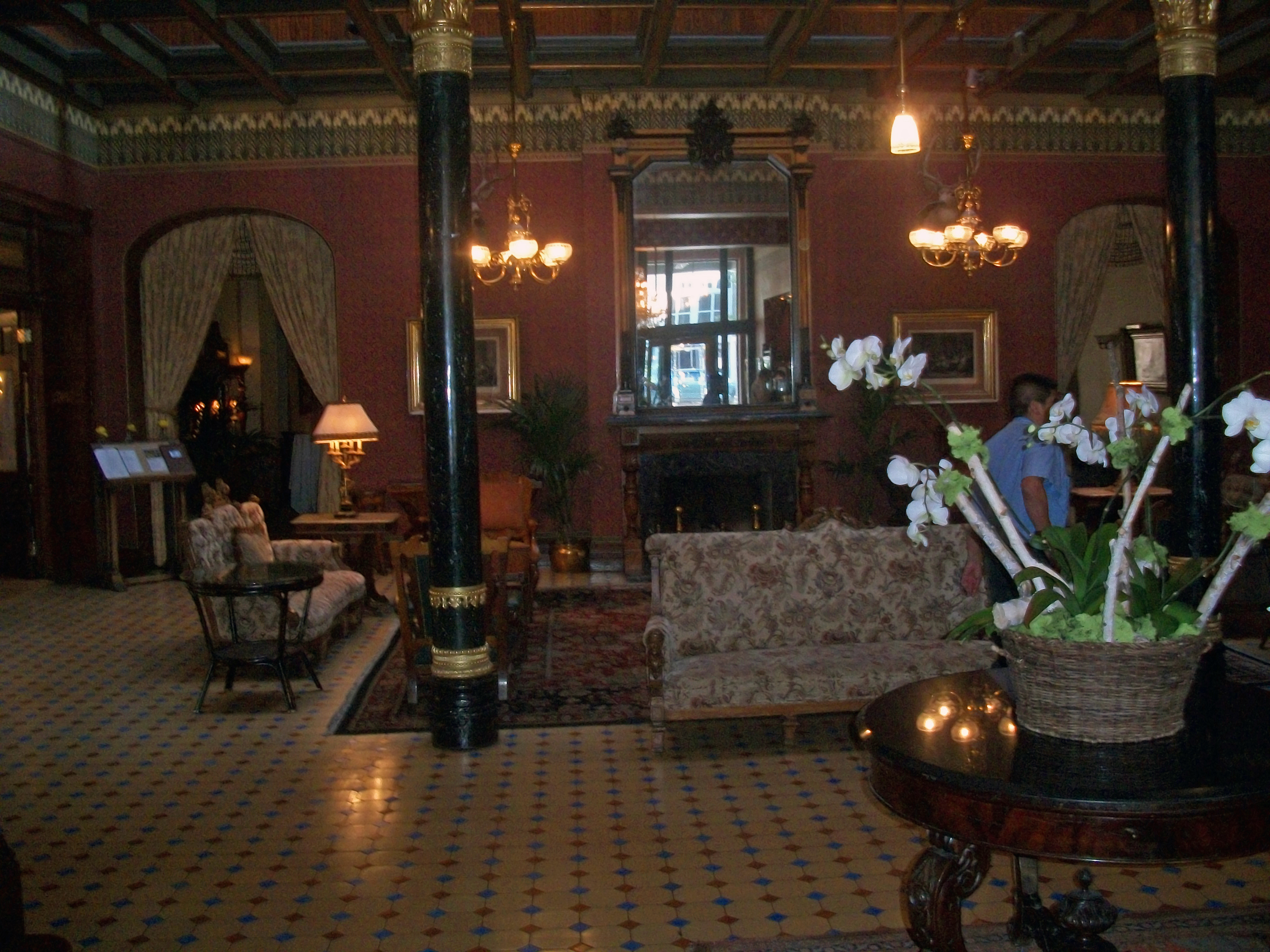
Main lobby

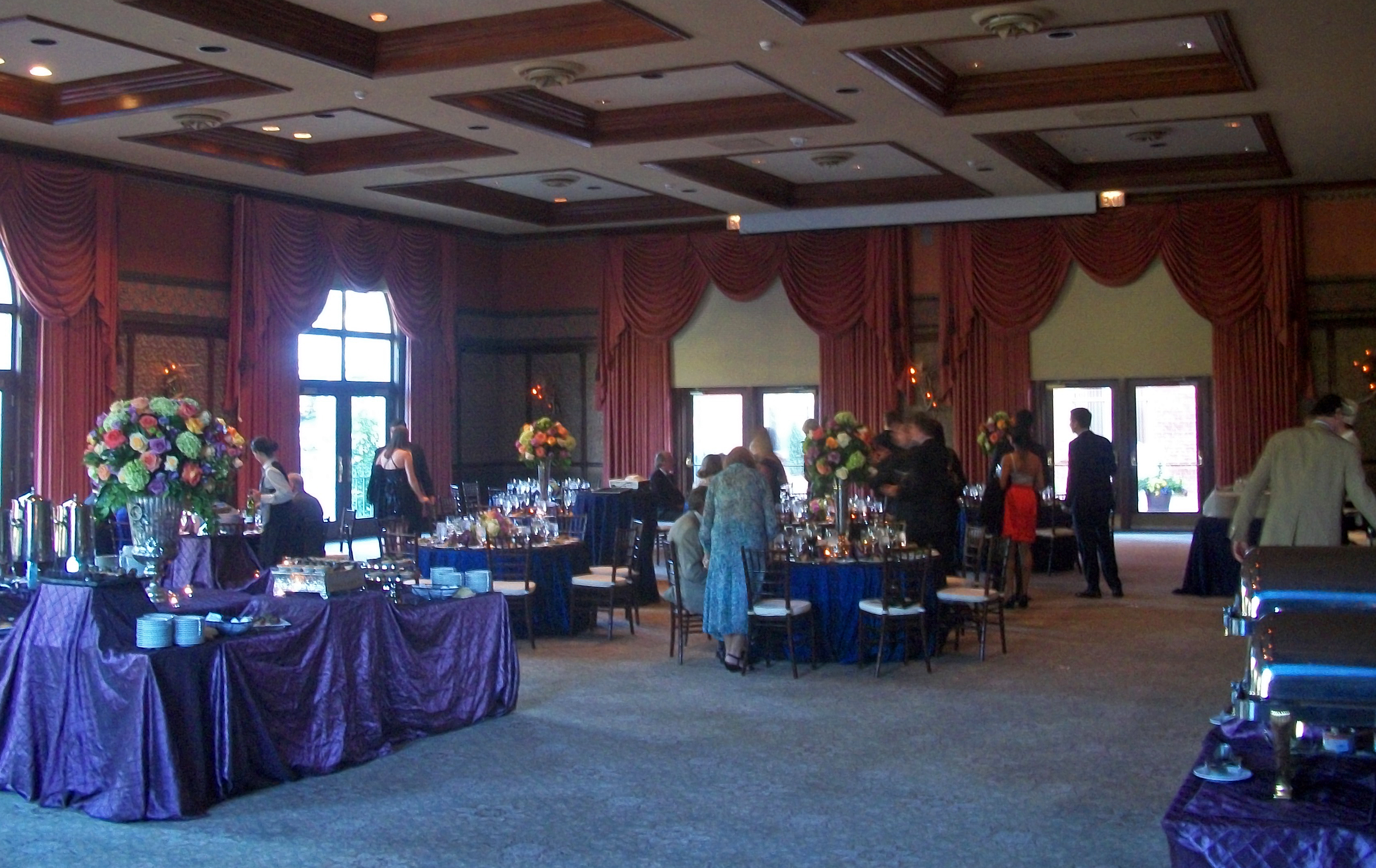
Grand Ballroom

Inside, many original finishes remain. The lobby has been restored to its original appearance. From the lobby, hallways lead to the Garden Terrace restaurant in a western annex, with an adjacent outdoor terrace south of the swimming pool. The first floor is also home to several meeting spaces, including the 3,450-square-foot (321 m^{2}) Grand Ballroom in the northeast corner of the rear block, the only above-ground ballroom in Aspen, with 16-foot (4.9 m) ceilings.

On the upper floors, there are 94 guest rooms. They range from 500 to 750 square feet (46 to 70 m^{2}) in size, from single rooms to suites. Standard amenities include marble vanities in the bathrooms, high-speed Internet access, a DVD player, a fully stocked mini-bar, and beds with 300-thread-count linens. Their configuration has changed considerably from their original layout.

== History ==
The Jerome's history parallels Aspen's. It was opened with grand ambitions in the city's early boom years and survived as Aspen's only hotel during the city's long "quiet years" in the early 20th century, under the ownership of the Elisha family. With the development of skiing after World War II, it began to see a new potential realized only with major renovations at the end of the 20th century that made it the upscale hotel it is today.

=== 1889–1892: Construction and early boom years ===
In the late 1870s, prospectors venturing west from Leadville in search of silver veins crossed the Continental Divide at Independence Pass and continued down the Roaring Fork Valley to establish several mining camps. One of them, at the confluence of the Roaring Fork and Castle Creek, became the area's pre-eminent settlement by 1879. At first it was called Ute City, after the local Native American tribe, but by the early 1880s it had been renamed Aspen, after the trees abundant in the area.

Jerome Wheeler, then a co-owner of Macy's, visited Aspen in 1883 while on vacation in Colorado. He was impressed by the potential he saw and began investing in the community, completing a smelter that had been started earlier so that ore did not have to be taken back to Leadville. After winning a legal battle over the rights to the Smuggler Mine, the richest lode in the area, and leaving Macy's, he commissioned the construction of the hotel and the Wheeler Opera House, both bearing his name, as well as a house in the city's residential West End.

Wheeler meant for the hotel to be the equal of great European hotels such as Claridge's in London and the George-V in Paris. He loaned $60,000 ($2.15 million in modern dollars) to another local innkeeper to build the hotel. Costs escalated to more than twice that amount, and a month before the hotel was set to open, the builders left town unexpectedly, leaving Wheeler owing approximately $150,000 ($5.38 million in modern dollars). "[He had] discovered the first rule of building in Aspen: it always costs way more than you planned", observed a commentator over a century later.

It was one of the first buildings west of the Mississippi to have full electric lighting. Other amenities included running water, indoor plumbing, steam heat, and an elevator. At the time of its opening, on the night before Thanksgiving, it had 90 rooms (or 76, according to some accounts), which rented for up to $4 ($100 in modern dollars) a night. Early guests included Wheeler's business friends from the East, theater stars of the era and wealthy travelers. As its builder had intended, it occupied the most commanding location in the city.

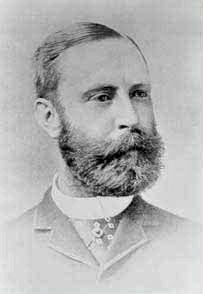
Jerome Wheeler

In 1892, three years after its completion, Wheeler sold the hotel to a Denver man named Archie Fisk for $125,000 ($4.48 million in modern dollars) as part of a general liquidation of his Aspen assets after losing a lengthy lawsuit over a mining deal. The next year, in response to the Panic of 1893, Congress repealed the Sherman Silver Purchase Act, ending the Colorado Silver Boom and with it Aspen's early boom years. Fisk could not pay taxes on the property, and it soon became the property of Pitkin County, and then became Wheeler's again. It remained the center of the city's social life, partially because it had the only public bathroom downtown.

=== 1893–1946: The quiet years ===
Over the next several decades, a period that came to be known later as "the quiet years", the town's population declined from thousands to hundreds. The Jerome remained open, the city's only hotel, often becoming by default a boardinghouse. In 1911, ownership passed to local businessman Mansor Elisha, a Syrian American drummer with a travelling band who had stopped in Aspen, taken a job as the Jerome's bartender, and later acquired the hotel from Wheeler, who had by this time long left the city and was unable to pay the taxes as he had gone bankrupt.

In 1918, the Jerome's parlors served as morgues during the flu epidemic. The next year, Elisha threw a welcome-home dance for local soldiers returning from World War I. Prohibition had started by then, and to survive, the J-Bar became a soda fountain. Liquor service continued, in the form of a popular drink called the Aspen Crud, still served there today, that is essentially a vanilla ice cream soda or milkshake generously spiked with bourbon. Whole families were known to stop by after church and share one.

Mansor Elisha died in 1935, leaving his son Laurence in charge of the hotel. The following year the seeds were planted for the city's recovery when Tom Flynn, a former resident trying to sell some of his mining claims, showed pictures of them to Billy Fiske, a U.S. Olympic bobsledder who had competed at the Winter Olympics earlier that year. He saw perfect terrain for a ski resort and went out to Aspen to buy some land. Over that winter, the newly formed Highland Bavarian ski club built its first ski run near Ashcroft. Its first two guides, Swiss skier André Roch and Austrian mountaineer Gunther Langes, lived in the Jerome for five weeks while the lodge was finished.

A crude ski lift was later built in Aspen itself, the beginnings of today's ski resort. The outbreak of World War II put further skiing development on hold, but not skiing itself as the U.S. Army's Tenth Mountain Division's "soldiers on skis" began training at nearby Camp Hale. After one long cross-country skiing exercise over the mountains, the soldiers went, still on skis, straight to the Jerome, where Laurence Elisha, then the owner, let them spend the night and offered them free drinks. Many were struck by the vintage decor. "The only thing missing was a bunch of trail-worn cowboys or dirt-stained miners bellied up to the bar", one observed. Throughout their training, Elisha offered them a room and a steak dinner for a dollar a night. It became popular for the Tenth's trainees on weekend leave, since Leadville was off-limits and Denver was a lot farther away.

=== 1946–1984: Ski resort and celebrity hangout ===
After the war, some veterans of the Tenth returned to Aspen, including Friedl Pfeifer, another Austrian who had been involved in developing the ski resort before the war. In 1946 Walter Paepcke, then president of the Container Corporation of America, visited the city with his wife Elizabeth. The couple was looking for a place in the Colorado mountains that would be ideal for an American counterpart to the Salzburg Festival. Aspen had many rundown, neglected buildings at the time, but they saw a lot of Victorian charm that could be brought back to life. They were cheap, and Paepcke bought or leased many, including the Jerome. Pfeifer also convinced him of the area's skiing potential, and Paepcke invested the money in the Aspen Skiing Company that Pfeifer had founded. That allowed the completion of Ski Lift No. 1, claimed to be the longest in the world. Its gala opening in January 1947 was the end of Aspen's "quiet years".

As he had done with his other Aspen acquisitions, Paepcke commissioned Austrian Bauhaus architect Herbert Bayer to renovate the Jerome. Bayer's main change on the outside was to paint the exterior a light grey color, with blue accents on the window arches in a color called "Bayer blue", a change that was not popular with most longtime residents, who preferred the original brick. The pool and poolhouse were also added. Inside, the maple bar was completely restored, and moved along with the front desk to its present location. The Aspen Institute leased the hotel to provide space for participants and staff, and the renovations reduced the available rooms to 39.

A new swimming pool was built, and it soon became the first place in Aspen where celebrities could be seen. In addition to movie stars of the era like Gary Cooper, Lana Turner and John Wayne, intellectual Mortimer Adler, helping to lead the Aspen Institute in its early days, could be seen lounging around it. The actors routinely stayed in the same suite on the second floor, and children in the city frequently knocked on its door to collect autographs. Writer Evelyn Ames called the Jerome during this period "a surprisingly heady brew ... of Europe and the corner drugstore, of poets and cowboy boots."

In the 1960s, as the city steadily grew as a ski town, the Jerome declined. It was closed for several years. When John Gilmore bought it in 1968 and reduced it to 34 rooms, he rented them for a mere $5 ($46.00 in modern dollars) a night. Many of the younger people who were increasingly drawn to Aspen sneaked in to take showers on the third floor. He tried to interest investors in rehabilitating the building, but could not. He was able to add new entrances to the storefronts, however.

The influx of newcomers to Aspen at the time was largely hippies and other countercultural types of the era. They were attracted to Aspen by its natural beauty, skiing and remoteness from larger population centers. It had been popularized in the writings of gonzo journalist Hunter S. Thompson, himself a transplant to the area who had almost been elected Pitkin County sheriff on a promise to put profiteering drug dealers in the stocks on the lawn of the county courthouse. During the 1970s, he was a regular at the J-Bar, coming in from his home in nearby Woody Creek to pick up his mail and then hang out at the bar, drinking, eating and watching television as it had the best reception in the area before cable became widespread. "It was his office", one bartender from the time recalled. "If people wanted to meet Hunter, they'd come to the Jerome."

Early in the decade, a new Los Angeles band, then known as Teen King and the Emergencies, went up to Aspen to perfect their country-rock sound before releasing their first album as The Eagles. Their members also became familiar sights at the J-Bar, along with fellow musician Jimmy Buffett and another rising Hollywood star, Jack Nicholson. Aspen's first disco, The Rocking Horse, was opened in the basement along with a Moroccan-themed restaurant featuring belly dancers. Bill Murray stayed at the Jerome in 1980 while filming Where the Buffalo Roam, based on Thompson's life, and the nightly parties that started in the J-Bar continued in his suite. After the Eagles broke up, Glenn Frey took the "large convention of young monsters" at the J-Bar as inspiration for his 1982 single "Partytown". "Everybody getting high on whatever's there, everything, all the time."

=== 1985–present: Renovation and restoration ===
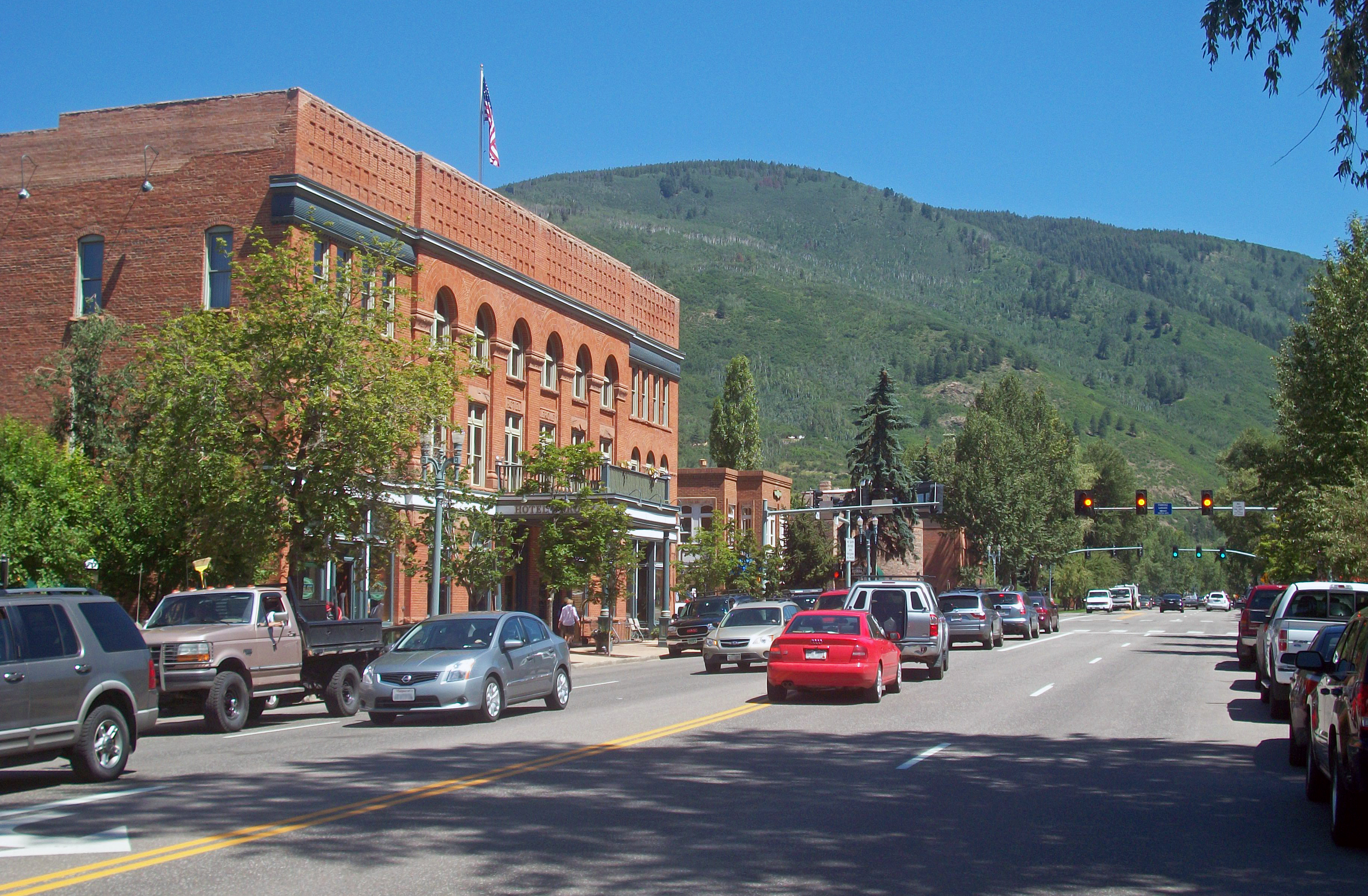
Hotel Jerome and Main Street, 2010

In 1985, a group of investors headed by a local developer, Dick Butera, bought the Jerome for $6 million ($18 million in modern dollars) and began the restoration Gilmore had tried to begin 17 years earlier, a project that cost more than quadruple the purchase price. The structural system was restored. All the interior finishes were restored to their original condition. On the outside, Bayer's paint scheme was blasted off in favor of the original brick. The last change was as popular with the community as the original paint scheme had not been. In her 1991 romance novel Aspen Gold, Janet Dailey praised the result: "... once again, the Hotel Jerome stood in stately dignity ... no longer a symbol of Aspen's rich past but a vital part of its present." The Hotel Jerome logo was designed by Jamie Koval from The Marlow Group.

Around the turn of the 20th century, two further renovations took place. The first, in 1998, used photographs over a century old to restore the J-Bar's original appearance. Four years later, a $6 million project added a new rear wing and grand ballroom, and restored the guest rooms.

Hunter S. Thompson, who had worked out of the J-Bar for so many years, died in 2005; his memorial service was held in the ballroom. That year the Gaylord family, publishers of The Oklahoman newspaper, bought the hotel for $33.7 million. They sought to further expand and renovate it with a fourth floor. Two years later, the Gaylords, tired of the city's delays in approving their project, sold the hotel for $52.2 million.

The buyers were two Chicago-based entities, Elysian Worldwide LLC and Lodging Capital Partners LLC (LCP), headed by David Pisor, owner of the Elysian, Chicago. They hired RockResorts, a subsidiary of Vail Resorts, owner of the Vail Ski Resort, Aspen's principal competitor in that area, to manage the Jerome. To finance the purchase they took out a mortgage with Morgan Stanley. The note later became the property of the Lehman Brothers investment bank. After the firm went bankrupt, a new entity, Jerome Property LLC, became the holder of the debt.

Jerome Property soon filed for foreclosure against the two owners, citing nonpayment of the remaining $36 million balance. LCP and Elysian initially contested the filing, saying they had not defaulted, but a sale was later approved. LCP-Elysian conveyed the trust deed, with which it had originally collateralized the loan, to Jerome Ventures, a wholly owned subsidiary of its creditor, in exchange for the forgiveness of the remaining debt in 2009.

The new owner applied to the city for an exemption from the real estate transfer tax it charges, on the grounds that it had acquired the property through foreclosure proceedings. It was granted, because the city normally does not charge lenders in those situations since they usually resell the property. Later, however, the city learned that Jerome Properties in fact intended to retain and benefit from ownership. In 2010, it told Jerome Property that the sale might indeed be taxable.

Jerome Property then took the unusual step of foreclosing on its own subsidiary. It also filed in state court for a declaratory judgment that that transfer was not subject to the tax, either. The city responded that the foreclosure had been a fraudulent conveyance in order to avoid a tax bill estimated at around a half million dollars. In 2011, the judge ruled in favor of Jerome Property, saying the city had interpreted its own statute too narrowly. The city is considering whether to appeal. Later that year, Jerome brought in Auberge Collection to replace Rock as the hotel manager.

In January 2012, the entire hotel was rented out for a weekend for a bat mitzvah. Later that year, the hotel closed for several months before ski season to renovate the interiors of all rooms and the J-Bar. The renovation also included adding the underground speakeasy Bad Harriet bar, which serves several cocktails named after Harriet Macy Wheeler, the wife of the hotel's original developer, Jerome B. Wheeler.

Hotel Jerome has hosted the annual Epicurean Passport culinary event since 2021, with the sixth edition taking place during the 2026 Food & Wine Classic in Aspen.

In 2023, Hotel Jerome's Prospect restaurant introduced a tasting menu inspired by the microclimates of the Aspen region.

In 2025, Hotel Jerome and the Wheeler Opera House began a year-long, collaboration to host various community events. The collaboration produced programs such as artist residencies, performances at Hotel Jerome's Bad Harriet bar, pre-theater dining at Prospect, and cultural packages for hotel guests.

Also in 2025, the Friedkin family, who own Hotel Jerome, invested $4.5 million to "refresh" the hotel while it was closed during a five-week off-season. The refresh included new carpet, wallpaper, lighting fixtures, and artwork in the hotel's rooms, while maintaining its historic roots.

Hotel Jerome hosted The Farm Collaborative's Regeneration Ball on August 2, 2025. Proceeds from the ball supported The Farm Collaborative's planned Regenerative Agriculture Learning Center at Cozy Point Ranch.

In 2026, Burberry opened a temporary pop-up at Hotel Jerome, featuring pieces from the summer 2026 runway styles, heritage collection rainwear, scarves, and soft accessories.

== Reviews ==
Travel writers and guides have heaped praise on the Jerome. "[It is] one of the best places to stay in Aspen—for those who can afford it", says Frommer's. Fodor's gives it a Fodor's Choice, calling it "[o]ne of the state's truly grand hotels."

"Fancy digs aren't my priority when I travel," wrote Phil Marty of the Chicago Tribune, "but then you walk into something like Room 302 and think, 'Well, maybe I should spend more time in my room.'" He praised the staff's helpfulness in finding another place to valet-park his car with two bicycles on top, and the two half-liter water bottles and Toblerone candy bars on the desk when he came in. He had a few minor complaints: at the time (2007) the hotel did not have free Wi-Fi, the room's light switch could not function as a dimmer, and the hotel would stock the mini-bar only on a guest's request.

== See also ==
- List of hotels in the United States
- National Register of Historic Places listings in Pitkin County, Colorado
