= Thomas Hynes House =

Historic house in Colorado, United States

- U.S. National Register of Historic Places
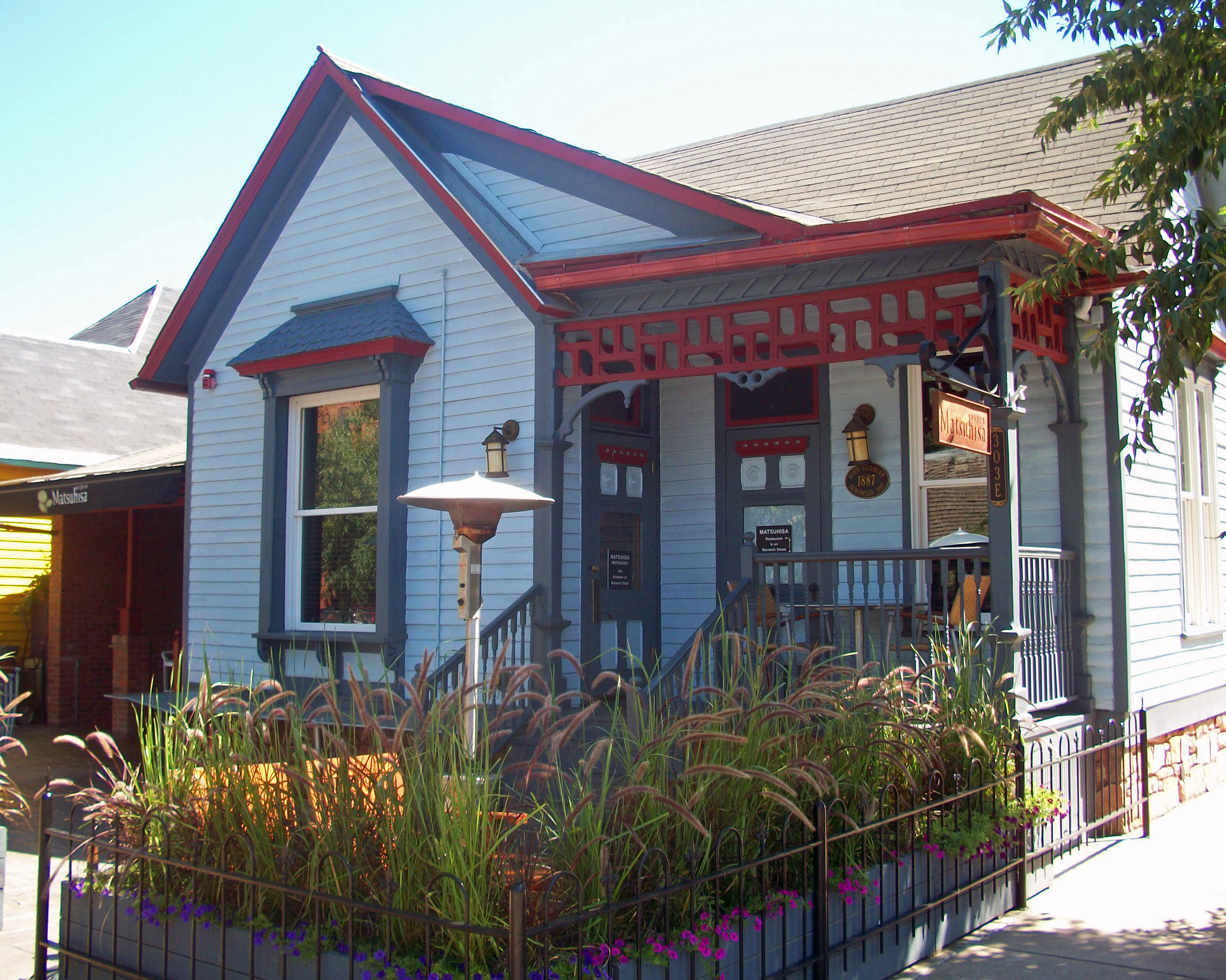
- North elevation, 2010

- Location within Colorado
- Location: Aspen, CO
- Coordinates: 39°11′26″N 106°49′12″W
- Built: 1885
- MPS: Historic Resources of Aspen
- NRHP reference No.: 87000157
- Added to NRHP: March 6, 1987

The Thomas Hynes House on East Main Street (State Highway 82) in Aspen, Colorado, United States, is a wooden building from the 1880s. In 1987 it was listed on the National Register of Historic Places as part of a group of historic properties in the city.

It is one of Aspen's remaining miner's cottages from its early years as a silver boomtown. Since it has never been significantly altered, it is considered one of the best examples remaining. Today it is used as one of Nobu Matsuhisa's eponymous Japanese restaurants.

== Building ==
The house occupies a small lot at the southeast corner of East Main and South Monarch streets. The area is generally built up, where the commercial development of downtown Aspen begins to transition to the residential West End. Most of the neighboring buildings on that side of the street are small one-story structures, either commercial or, like the Hynes house, former houses adapted for commercial purposes. Across the street are generally taller buildings, with the Hotel Jerome, also listed on the Register, at the opposite end of the block. The terrain is generally flat, between the foot of Aspen Mountain to the south and the Roaring Fork River to the north.

The building itself is an L-shaped one-story clapboard-sided wood frame structure on a sandstone foundation. It is topped by a steeply pitched cross-gabled shingled roof pierced by brick chimneys in the center of each section. The chimneys have corbeling below their caps.

On the north (front) and west are porches, some with trim reflecting its current use. The north porch has a flat roof with ornate frieze supported by pillars. Next to it is a large double-hung window with pent-roof top. On the west is a large bay window, supported by sawn wood brackets.

Inside the building has been completely remodeled for the restaurant. It follows the Japanese aesthetics of the food. The owner describes the interior as "a modern design that is cool and urban to the nth degree".

== History ==
Aspen was founded in the late 1870s by prospectors drawn over the Continental Divide into the Roaring Fork Valley from Leadville. They sought, and found, silver in the mountains. The small settlement at the confluence of Castle Creek became the busiest of the mining camps in the area, soon evolving from a rough collection of tents and log cabins to a permanent and growing city.

Miners began building small cottages for themselves to replace the log cabins as they became prosperous. The Hynes house, with its L-shape, steeply pitched cross-gabled roof, porches, and bay window, epitomizes the form. Those cottages were themselves often demolished for larger houses, or, after the collapse of the silver market following the repeal of the Sherman Silver Purchase Act in the Panic of 1893, allowed to fall into neglect during the long "quiet years" that followed until the development of the ski resort in the mid-20th century turned the city's economy around.

Little is known about Hynes beyond that he was a miner, built the house around 1885, then had moved to South Aspen Street sometime before 1893. The next owner, a doctor, made several improvements in 1892. During the quiet years, a sale for $500 ($11,000 in modern dollars) was recorded in 1918 to Homer VanLoon, Pitkin County's first welfare director.

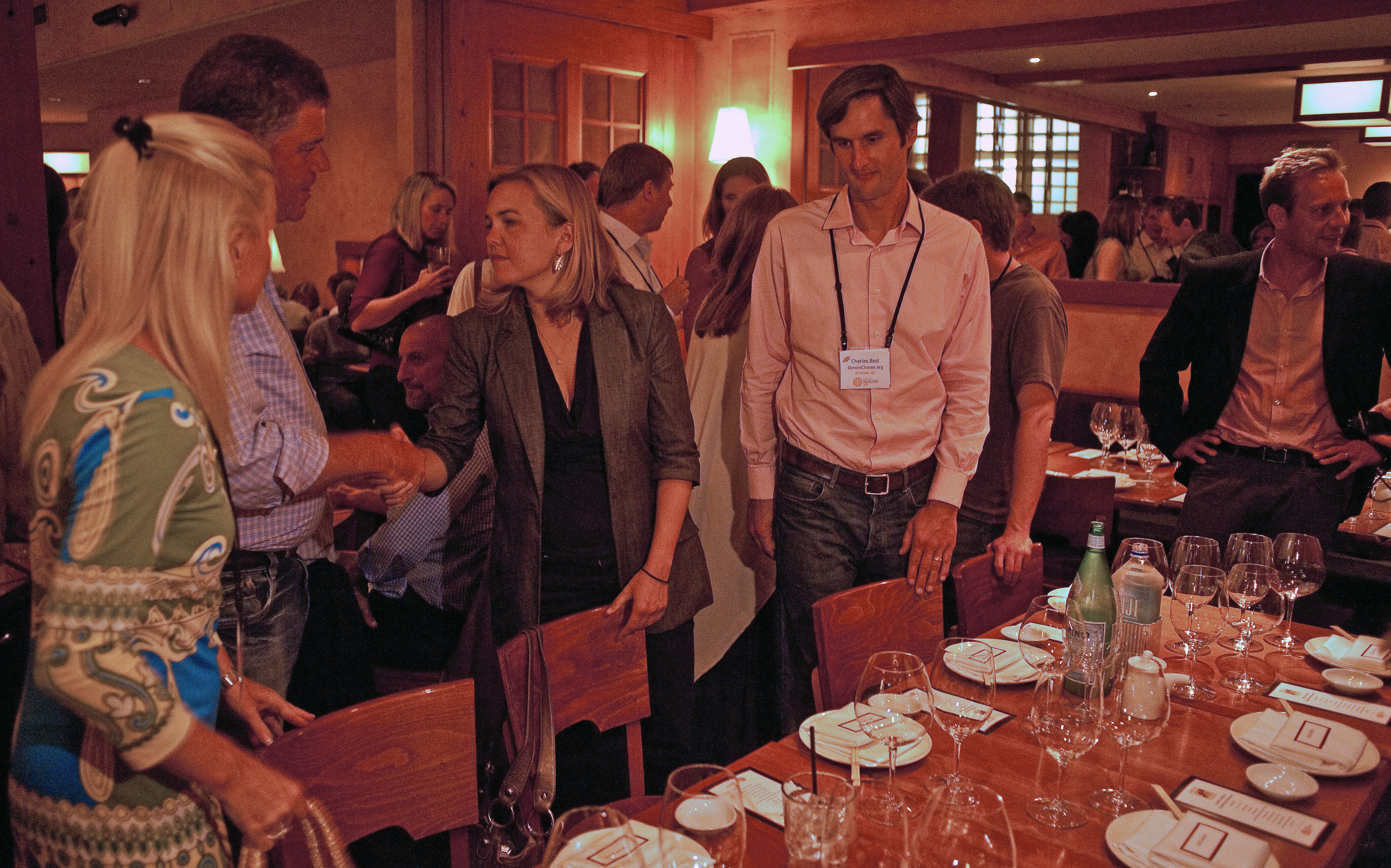
A party sitting down to dinner at Matsuhisa

As the city grew again, the house remained standing. It passed through several owners and was never seriously altered. In 1998 chef Nobu Matsuhisa, who had become famous for blending elements of Western and Latin American cuisine into traditional Japanese dishes, remodeled the house and opened one of the restaurants bearing his last name there. It has since become one of the city's most popular and best-regarded eateries. Reservations must be made a month in advance.

== See also ==
- National Register of Historic Places listings in Pitkin County, Colorado
