= Auberge Collection =

American hospitality group

- Type: Privately held company
- Industry: Hospitality
- Founded: 1981; 45 years ago in Napa Valley, California
- Founder: Robert "Bob" Harmon; Claude Rouas
- Area served: United States, Mexico, France, UK, Italy, Greece, and Costa Rica
- Key people: Dan Friedkin (Chairman); Christian Clerc (President & CEO)
- Revenue: US$310 million (2023)
- Number of employees: 1,000+ (2023)
- Website: auberge.com

Auberge Collection is a hospitality group headquartered in Bethesda, Maryland. They own a variety of hotels, resorts, residences and private clubs.

Auberge Collection was founded in 1981. Its first property was Auberge du Soleil in Napa Valley. Originally established as a restaurant, Auberge du Soleil later expanded into a luxury inn. Afterwards, the inn was expanded into the Auberge Collection's resorts as additional branches were developed.

== Organization ==
=== Hotels ===
- Auberge du Soleil (first location) – Rutherford, California, U.S.
- Cambridge House – London, United Kingdom
- Commodore Perry Estate Hotel – Austin, Texas, U.S.
- Hotel Jerome – Aspen, Colorado, U.S.
- Wildflower Farms – Gardiner, New York, U.S.

Auberge Collection currently has 39 properties globally. The Dunlin opened in August 2024 in the Kiawah River community near Charleston, South Carolina, with 72 guest rooms and suites. In 1880, Macy's co-owner Jerome B. Wheeler opened The Hotel Jerome in Aspen, Colorado. It was listed on the National Register of Historic Places in 1986. Beginning in the 1950s, the Jerome attracted artists, writers, and actors like John Wayne, Gary Cooper, Lana Turner, and Hunter S. Thompson.

Auberge Collection's first hotel, Auberge du Soleil, opened in 1981 in Napa Valley by Bob Harmon and his son, Mark. It was the first of its kind in Napa. It originally opened as a restaurant, and later added cottages for guests.

In 2014, the Harmon family began divesting its ownership stake in Auberge Resorts, selling an interest in the company to Friedkin Capital Partners (now The Friedkin Group), led by businessman Dan Friedkin. By 2018, The Friedkin Group acquired full ownership of Auberge Resorts.

In March 2025, Auberge Collection opened its first property in Italy. Collegio alla Querce is an 83-room hotel housed in a restored former boarding school in Florence.

Auberge Collection plans to open two additional properties in 2026: Cambridge House in London, United Kingdom and The Knox in Dallas, Texas.

In June 2026, Auberge Collection opened Auberge Safari, its first property in Africa. Auberge Safari includes nine camps and lodges across northern Tanzania, including wilderness areas like the Serengeti National Park, the Greater Mwiba Protected Wildlife Area, and the Burunge Wildlife Management Area.
