= Pitkin County Courthouse =

Courthouse in Aspen, Colorado, US

- U.S. National Register of Historic Places
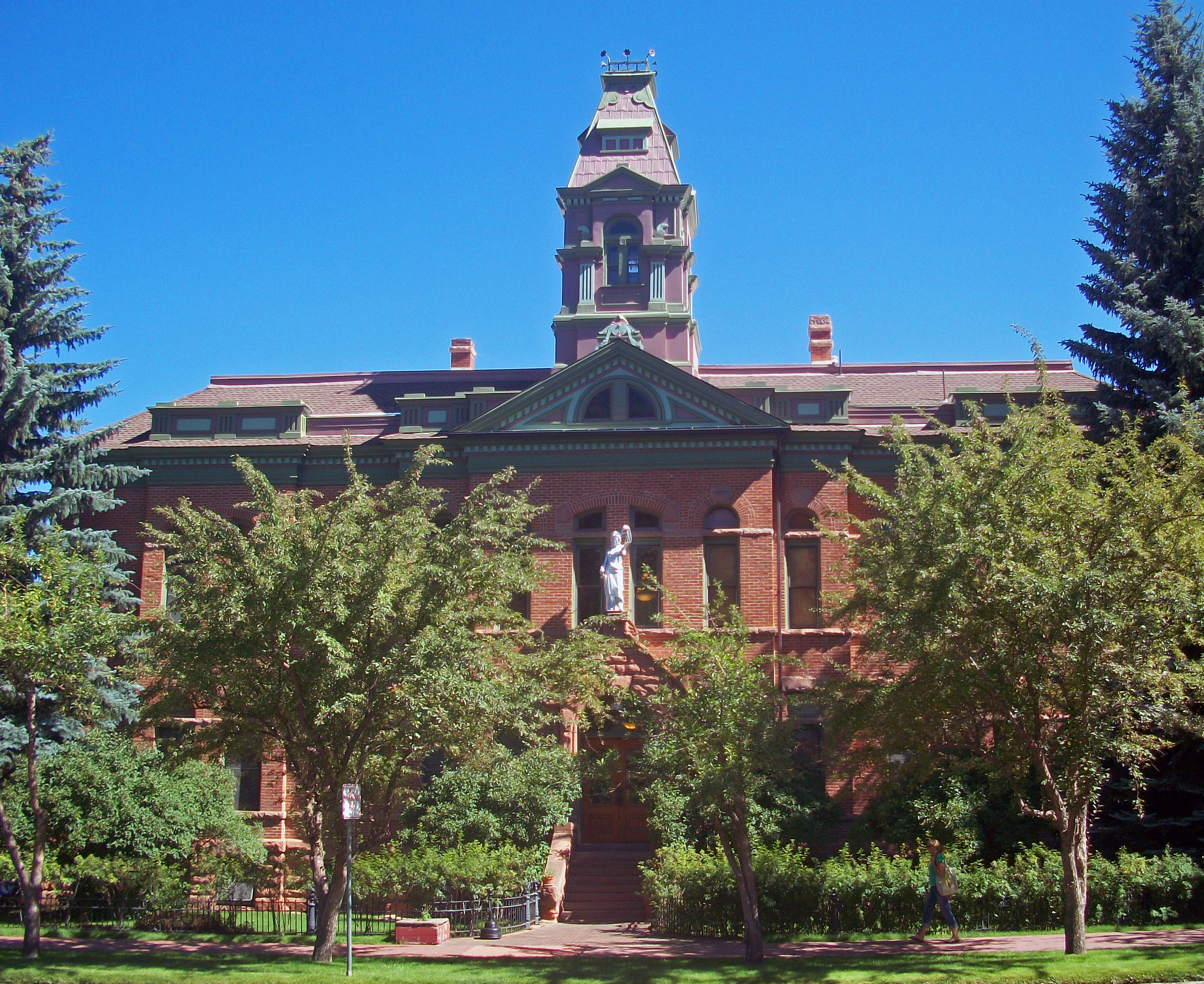
- South elevation, 2010

- Location within Colorado
- Location: Aspen, CO
- Coordinates: 39°11′25″N 106°49′2″W
- Built: 1890
- Architect: William Quayle
- Architectural style: Victorian
- NRHP reference No.: 75000531
- Added to NRHP: May 12, 1975

The Pitkin County Courthouse is located on East Main Street (State Highway 82) in Aspen, Colorado, United States. It is a large brick building erected in the late 19th century that serves as offices of Pitkin County's courts. A landmark of the city, it was listed on the National Register of Historic Places in 1975.

Like many courthouses, it has a statue of Lady Justice in the front. Unlike many of the other such statues, she is depicted without a blindfold. In the late 20th and 21st centuries, as Aspen became a popular destination for wealthy and famous people, the courthouse has seen several high-profile defendants and litigants, from Ted Bundy to Charlie Sheen.

== Building ==
The courthouse is located on the north side of the block of East Main between Galena and Hunter streets, closer to the former on the west. Across the street is an open area around St. Mary's Catholic Church. A mix of commercial and residential properties and the Pitkin County Library are to the northwest and a small housing development lies to the east. is to the southeast on South Hunter. Two blocks west is another Aspen landmark, the Hotel Jerome. Aspen City Hall is a block away at South Galena and East Hopkins. The terrain slopes slightly toward the Roaring Fork River to the north.

The building itself is a two-story brick structure on a stone foundation, raised to expose the basement. It is set back from the street, fronted by a low iron fence, red cobblestone sidewalk, and small trees and shrubbery. Two large evergreens flank the courthouse. A large modern extension containing the jail is located to the rear.

On the 13-bay south (front) facade, the five-bay projecting entrance pavilion, itself with the center three bays projecting, is complemented by two lesser projections on the third and fourth bays from the center. Bricks are laid in stretcher bond. Stone belt courses provide sills and lintels the narrow one-over-one double-hung sash windows on the first story. Segmental arches of vertical brick, with keystones, spring from the lintels on the flanking projections.

The second-story windows are similarly treated but less restrained. All have segmental arches; the central window of the center pavilion, and the windows on the flanking ones, are combined under one larger arch with their transoms divided by the brick. Above them is a wide plain wooden frieze topped by a dentilled cornice at the roofline.

A pediment with doubled semicircular window and the same cornice treatment tops the middle three bays. Atop the other projecting sections are small solid wooden parapets with recessed panels alternating with fluting. The shallow hipped roof is pierced by two chimneys in the middle and a tall tower behind the front pavilion.

The lowest of the tower's four stages is a plain wooden section, topped with a cornice. The next two are united by a small pair of windows similar to those in the building, above a recessed panel and topped with a fanlight and pediment. On the second stage they are flanked by two wooden fluted pilasters; on the third by paneling and a spiral carving. The topmost stage is a peaked shingled roof with imitation miniature shed dormer windows.

At the entrance, stone steps rise up to a small, steeply gabled entrance projection faced in rough stone blocks. On the top is a silvery zinc statue of Lady Justice, without the blindfold common to many other depictions of her. Large wooden paneled double doors topped by an arched fanlight provide entrance.

== History ==
=== Construction ===
In the 1880s, Aspen went from an isolated mining camp on the far side of the Continental Divide to a city of over 10,000 people as a result of the Colorado Silver Boom. Pitkin County, named for then-Governor Frederick Walker Pitkin, was established in 1881. A small courthouse had been established at Cooper and Mill streets, but within ten years a larger one was needed. The county acquired five lots in May 1890 for a new building.

Great controversy surrounded the construction. There were accusations of corruption and favoritism. The county commissioners ignored calls to stop the project and went ahead with a design by Denver architect William Quayle. It was completed and opened early in 1891. The six-foot (2 m) statue of Lady Justice, one of the few in the United States showing her without the usual blindfold, was made of pressed stamped zinc in Salem, Ohio, for a cost of $250 ($9,000 in contemporary dollars).

External image
- Closeup of statue showing absence of blindfold

The statue's painted silvery exterior reflects the silver mining that was the root of Aspen's prosperity at that time. Why the blindfold was omitted is not known for certain. It has been humorously suggested that the commissioners, given the corruption allegations, decided Justice should be able to keep an eye on what was going on around her. Another account has it that the miners, who had previously set up their own informal courts to resolve disputes over claims, were reluctant to cede that authority, even to a legitimate governmental body. They therefore paid for the statue themselves and insisted that she be shown without the blindfold but with scales (weight being an impartial measure of mining success), to emphasize that in Aspen justice could be impartial without artificial restraints.

Ground was broken in July 1890, and the new courthouse was finished and opened in January 1891. It was celebrated as a major civic accomplishment. Newspapers ran long, laudatory articles; many politicians gave speeches at the dedication ceremony, and a fireman's ball was held that night.

=== Later years ===
When Aspen's population declined after 1893 and the repeal of the Sherman Silver Purchase Act, the courthouse remained functioning as the seat of government. It continued to be used and maintained as the city slipped into its "quiet years", of the early 20th century and its population dropped to less than a thousand. As skiing revived the city following World War II, it would play a role in the cultural changes Aspen underwent in the latter half of the century.

In 1961 Hunter S. Thompson, considered the founder of gonzo journalism but then unknown, came to Aspen with $2 and decided to stay, eventually settling in nearby Woody Creek. He later became famous writing articles such as "The Battle of Aspen" for Rolling Stone about the hippies and other countercultures of the era drawn to Aspen by its natural setting and their indulgence in sex and recreational drug use. In 1970 he ran unsuccessfully for county sheriff, catalyzing a growing conflict between the newer and older, more conservative residents. As part of his platform he promised to "install, on the courthouse lawn, a bastinado platform and set of stocks—in order to punish dishonest dope dealers in a proper public fashion."

Two events at the courthouse in 1977 gained national attention. The previous year singer Claudine Longet had been arrested and charged with murder after fatally shooting her boyfriend, skier Spider Sabich. She claimed it had been an accident. Her trial at the courthouse in early 1977 garnered international media attention, particularly because of the presence at the trial of celebrities who had begun making Aspen a second home. One, Jack Nicholson, a friend of Longet's, sat prominently behind the defense table in the courtroom every day of the trial. She was ultimately found guilty of a misdemeanor charge of negligent homicide, and spent three weeks in jail. Many longtime residents, in addition to believing Longet had been punished too lightly, came to consider the attention drawn to Aspen by the trial, and Nicholson's presence in particular, as the beginning of Aspen's conversion from a plain, unpretentious ski town to glamorous Hollywood satellite community.

Another 1976 homicide in the area put the courthouse in the national spotlight again later in 1977. On June 7, serial killer Ted Bundy, already serving a state prison sentence in Utah for kidnapping, was taken to Aspen to be tried for the murder of Caryn Campbell outside Snowmass the previous year. A onetime law student, he had chosen to represent himself, and thus was not shackled or handcuffed. During a recess in the proceedings, he went to the courthouse's law library on the second floor, ostensibly to review a map of the area prosecutors had introduced as evidence against him. As soon as he was alone he jumped out the window, 25 feet (7.6 m) above the ground, and fled into the mountains and wilderness around the city. His attempt to reach Crested Butte to the south failed, and he was recaptured in Aspen a week later.

Thirteen years later, another trial drew national attention. This time Thompson, who had once attempted to make the courthouse his workplace in his bid for sheriff, came to it as a defendant. Prosecutors had searched his Woody Creek home after porn-film director Gail Palmer told them he had grabbed her by the breasts after she refused to join him in a hot-tub party; they found drugs and some explosive devices. Thompson was charged with five felonies. During the months leading to the trial, Thompson's fans and supporters demonstrated outside the courthouse; late in 1990 the charges were dismissed over concerns the evidence against the journalist had been obtained through an unconstitutional search.

By 2010 the courthouse had been remodeled and upgraded. It still lacked the capacity to accommodate large crowds. In 2009 actor Charlie Sheen was charged with several felonies after allegedly holding a knife to the throat of wife Brooke Mueller on Christmas Day in their rented Aspen home. In advance of his appearances at the courthouse in summer of that year, where he eventually pleaded guilty to a misdemeanor, the city and county imposed limitations on access to the courthouse and media presence in the courtroom. Judge James Boyd issued a Decorum Order limiting attendance at the hearings to the courtroom's legal capacity of 60. The media was further limited to 20 seats, four of which were reserved for Aspen's local media (Note: Newspapers the Aspen Times, Aspen Daily News and radio stations KSPN-FM and KSNO-FM.) and the remaining 16 allocated by lottery. He specifically alluded to the building's age to justify those limitations.

== See also ==
- National Register of Historic Places listings in Pitkin County, Colorado
