= Ski Lift No. 1 =

- Boat Tow
- U.S. National Register of Historic Places
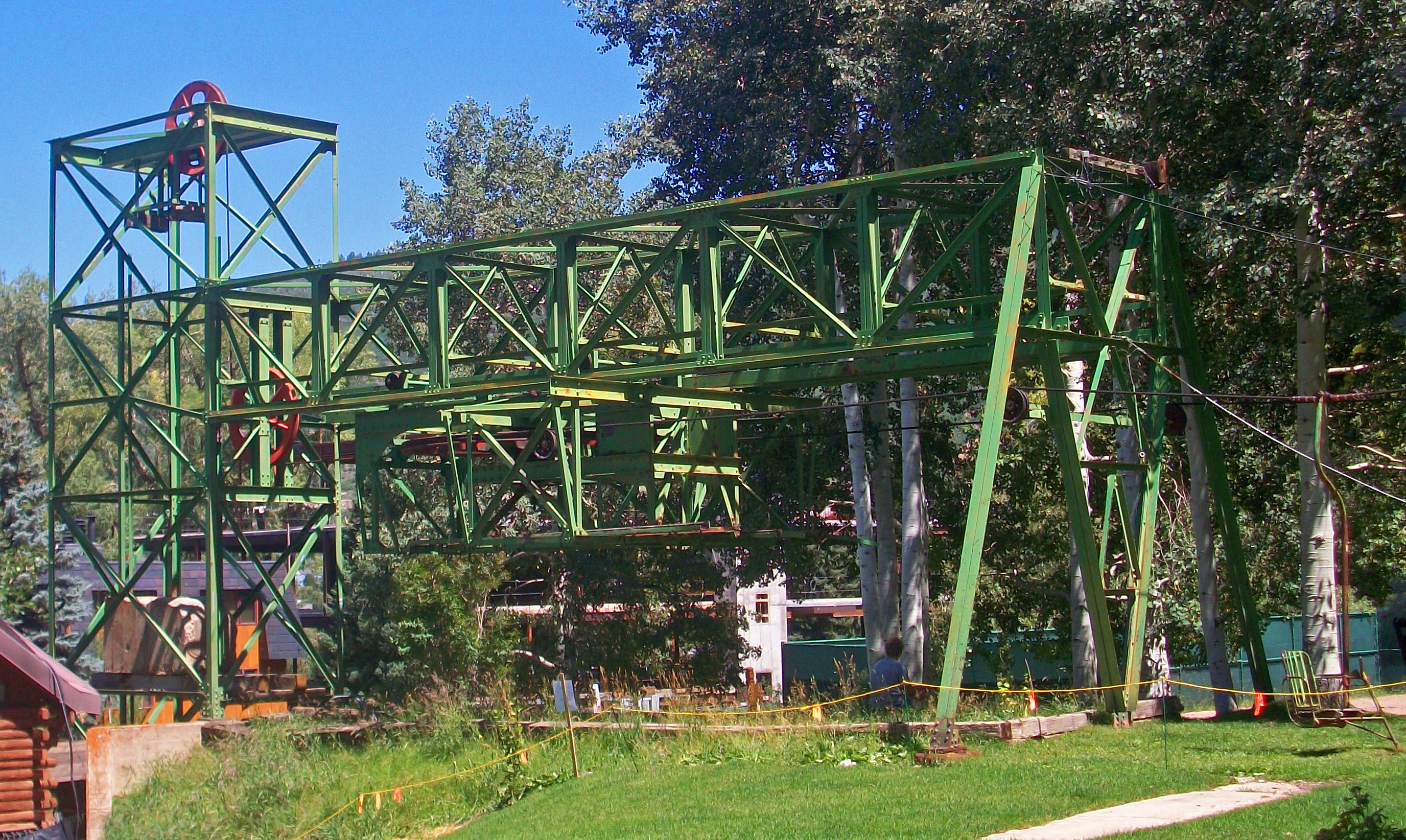
- West profile of bottom lift station, 2010

- Location within Colorado
- Location: Aspen, CO
- Coordinates: 39°11′13″N 106°49′20″W
- Built: 1939–47
- Architect: Bob Heron (designer), American Steel and Wire Company, builder
- NRHP reference No.: 90000866
- Added to NRHP: June 22, 1990

The former Ski Lift No. 1 begins on Aspen Street in Aspen, Colorado, United States, and climbs up the slopes of Aspen Mountain. It was built in the late 1940s on the site of Aspen's first ski lift, known as the Boat Tow. In 1990 it was listed under that name on the National Register of Historic Places, one of only two ski lifts in the country so recognized. (Note: The other is the Proctor Mountain Ski Lift at Sun Valley.)

It was originally built with motors and other equipment left over from Aspen's days as a silver mining center in the late 19th century. The development of the ski area that began with the lift began the revival of Aspen into the upscale resort town it has since become, which in turn helped establish downhill skiing as a major winter recreational activity in the Western United States after World War II.

When the current structure was opened, Aspen claimed it was the longest ski lift in the world. It was closed in 1971, but all its facilities remain on the mountain. It is one of the few remaining single-chair chairlifts in the United States. A small park and commemorative plaque have been established at the bottom station. One of the original boats was on display there as well, but has since been removed.

== Structure ==
The bottom station of the 6,800-foot (2.1 km) lift is located on the east side of South Aspen Street between East Dean Court and Gilbert Street. It is on a small level rise in an area which otherwise gradually slopes up to the base of the mountain. Around it on the block are chalet-style houses and condominiums. The area leading to South Aspen is open, with a small concrete area where one of the first lift boats was displayed in the past. Opposite the lift station is an unpaved parking lot.

The station itself is an L-shaped steel latticework structure with the long end running parallel to the ground for 30 feet (10 m) at a height of 10 feet (3 m). In the middle a substructure below supports the wide bullwheel around which the lift cable is looped. It drew its energy from another pulley system connected to the engine formerly in the 20-foot-high (6 m) short section, based below the lift's grade.

Along the cable single metal chairs hang at regular intervals. The cable, supported by 49 towers, climbs to its top station on a false summit between Spar and Keno gulches, approximately 10,480 feet (3,190 m) in elevation, 2,540 feet (770 m) above the base.

== History ==
The history of Ski Lift No. 1 is, in its early stages, intertwined with the history of skiing in Colorado and Aspen's founding as a mining town. The construction and opening of the lift in 1947 were a major turning point in both the history of the city and the development of recreational skiing in the United States.

=== 1857–1935: Skiing in Colorado ===
The use of skis for foot transportation, now known as Nordic skiing, has been documented in what is today Colorado since at least 1857. Residents of the isolated mining towns in the high Rocky Mountains found them absolutely necessary to get around during the severe mountain winters, occasionally holding informal races and competitions to pass the time. Aspen's earliest settlers, in 1879, learned to make and use such skis, often referred to at the time as "Norwegian snowshoes", from two Swedish immigrants among their number, helping them survive a winter in which the snowfall totaled 52 feet (16 m).

In the Colorado Silver Boom years of the 1880s, when Aspen was growing at a fantastic rate, miners working midway up the mountain from the town had, in the winter months, developed a method of riding long boards over the snow down the mountain, with a long metal pole between the legs attaching to the rear and used as a brake. It was a forerunner of skiing, used solely to speed their descent to the city's after-hours attractions, although they would sometimes race each other for fun. After the Sherman Silver Purchase Act was repealed during the Panic of 1893, the collapse of that market led to decades of slow decline, a period referred to today in histories of Aspen as "the quiet years".

In the early 1930s Alpine skiing came to the mountains of Colorado. The Arlburg club, a group of Denverites who had been introduced to the sport on visits to Europe, cut the state's first ski trail near Denver in what is now Winter Park. The next year the second U.S. national downhill ski championships were held at Estes Park.

=== 1936–45: Early development of skiing in Aspen ===
Two years after that, 1936, skiing came to Aspen. Bobsledder Billy Fiske and Ted Ryan, an heir of Thomas Fortune Ryan, had been looking for somewhere in America where a ski resort similar to those in Europe could be established. That summer, an Aspen man trying to sell some mining claims to Ryan showed him pictures of the area. Ryan saw good ski terrain in the photos and went to the remote mountain town with Fiske.

Frank and Fred Willoughby, sons of another Aspen miner, took the two up the mountain. Before leaving, Fiske bought an option on some property in the area. He and Ryan later had blueprints drawn up for a ski lodge, the Highland Bavarian, and by the end of the year it was under construction. Over the winter it offered guided mountain ski tours.

One of the first two guides hired was Swiss skiing champion André Roch, then studying at Reed College in Oregon. He became close friends with the Willoughbys while living at the Hotel Jerome he and fellow guide Gunther Langes waited for the lodge to be completed. By that time Aspen's population had dwindled into the hundreds. Many of its remaining buildings had fallen into disrepair and been boarded up. Roch noted that they could be purchased for as little as $30 ($700 in contemporary dollars.) Roch helped start the Roaring Fork Winter Sports Club, an organization similar to the ones in his native country, at the end of the year. Frank Willoughby was elected president, and Roch taught him and his brother how to ski. These events are today considered the beginning of skiing in Aspen.

The lodge opened two days after Christmas and five days after a similar facility at Sun Valley, Idaho, making Aspen the second European-style ski resort in the U.S. There were more than a hundred visitors that winter. Before he returned to Switzerland that spring, Roch had scouted and marked out a challenging ski route, explaining to the club that it would help Aspen attract major ski races and the tourism that would follow. Willoughby led the club in clearing and marking it that year. When winter came, the city's Lions Club raised $600 to build the first lift.

That lift was the Boat Tow, based on a similar device Ryan had seen on a trip to Kitzbühel in Austria. Two hoists were salvaged from an abandoned mine and powered with an old Model A engine. It was opened early in 1938. Skiers who endured the three-minute, 600-foot (180 m) ride up in the 12-by-3-foot (3.66 by 0.91 m) four-seat wooden sleds were able to ski one of the steepest and narrowest trails in North America off what was Colorado's biggest ski lift. A hundred people, paying either 10¢ a ride or 50¢ for the day ($2 and $10, adjusted for inflation, respectively) took the trip; many had made the difficult and lengthy drive from Denver for the opportunity. The city soon began hosting the annual Southern Rocky Mountain Alpine Championships, which brought more people, including radio personality Lowell Thomas, into Aspen at one time than had been there since the mining days.

Further development of Aspen's skiing facilities was stalled by World War II. Fiske, who had married an English countess and taken a job in Britain, joined the Royal Air Force and was one of the first Americans to die in combat. The other early principals went into the military when the U.S. entered the war at the end of 1941. During the war years, new members of the Army's Tenth Mountain Division trained at Camp Hale outside Leadville, on the other side of the Continental Divide from Aspen, and passed through the city during their training in skiing, mountaineering and winter warfare. One instructor, Friedl Pfeifer, was convinced as soon as he saw it that Aspen could be the American equal of Sankt Anton am Arlberg, the Tyrolean resort town in which he had grown up. After the war he and other veterans of the Tenth returned and resumed the work of developing the ski area.

More lodges were built and more trails cleared. Pfeifer founded the Aspen ski school, where other veterans of the Tenth found work as instructors. Walter Paepcke, a Chicago businessman who chanced through Aspen on a vacation, saw the potential and began devoting time and money to the new Aspen Skiing Company to realize it.

=== 1946–present: Transformation of Aspen ===
Everyone agreed that Aspen needed a better lift, one that went all the way to the top, to become a serious resort. Frank Willoughby surveyed a route in 1945. Chairlifts had been developed at Sun Valley before the war, and were in use near Aspen at the now-defunct Red Mountain ski area in Glenwood Springs. In 1946 Oregon's Hoodoo opened the first double chair. Pfeifer planned two chairs, a long one from the base to the false summit, and Ski Lift No. 2, a second chair to the 11,212-foot (3,417 m) summit of the mountain itself, where a lodge known as the Sundeck, designed by Bauhaus member architect Herbert Bayer, was built.

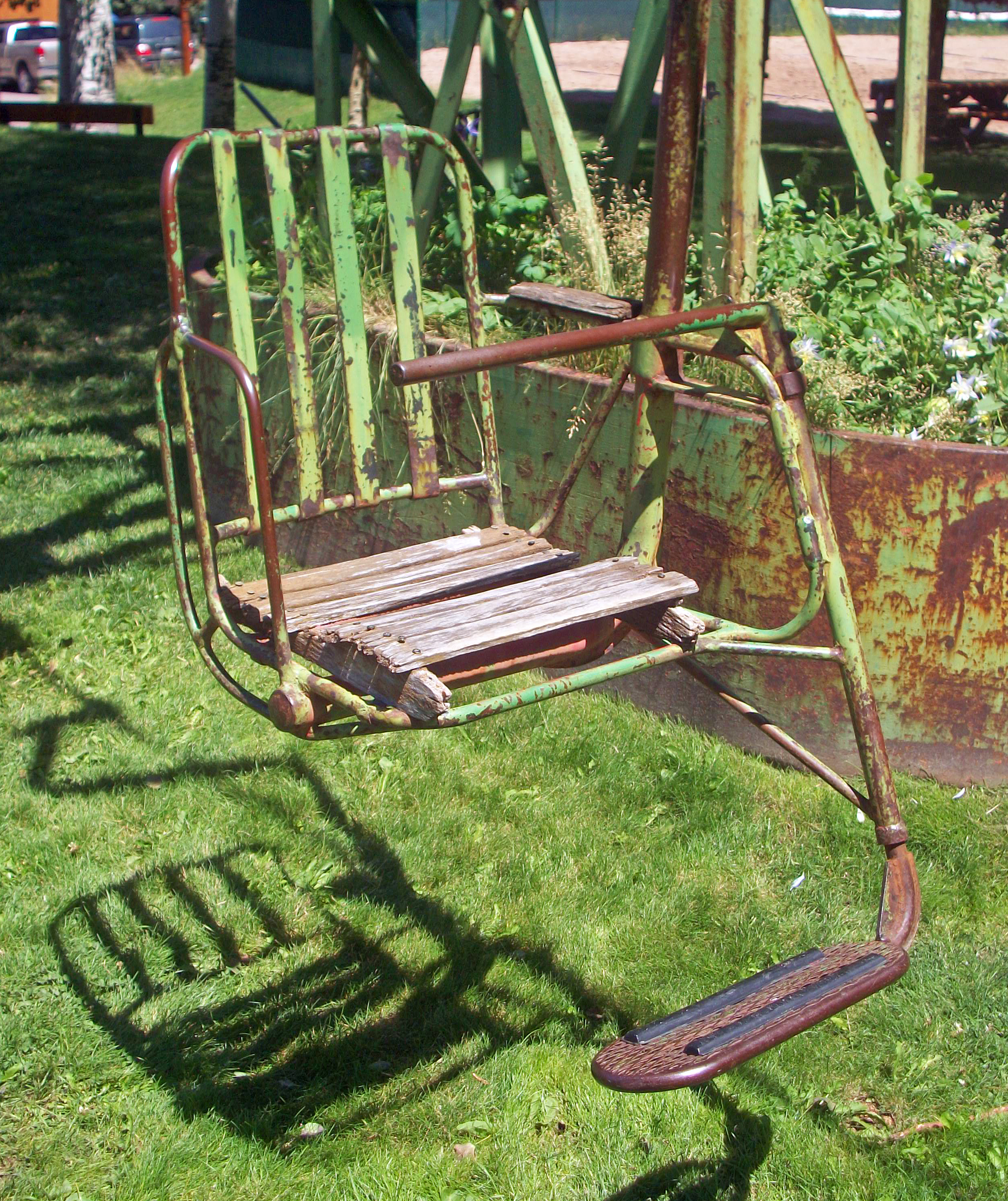
One of the lift chairs

Building the lift cost $250,000 ($4.13 million in contemporary dollars). Most labor was locally sourced. Frank Willoughby used a bulldozer to widen fire roads up the mountain. Bob Heron, a Denver engineer who had designed the portable combat lift used by the Tenth in its 1945 assault on Riva Ridge in northern Italy, came up with a similar design for the lifts that cannibalized abandoned mining hoists on the mountain. It was erected by American Steel and Wire, which had built the Sun Valley chairlifts. When the lift was finished late in 1946, Pfeifer and his young daughter were given the honor of the first ride on one of the 124 single chairs.

Its significance for the faded mining town was immediately recognized. For Aspen, a columnist for the local newspaper wrote, it meant "a new, good, and profitable way of life ... We in Aspen are now carrying the ball." Residents proclaimed that Lift No. 1 was the longest chairlift in the world, regardless of the competing claim made by Sun Valley.

The lift's formal opening was held January 11, 1947. Governor-elect William Lee Knous, U.S. Senator Edwin C. Johnson and other dignitaries came via a special excursion train from Denver. After giving a short speech under a sign reiterating the claim that the lift was the world's longest, Knous, flanked by Paepcke and Aspen's mayor, symbolically christened the lift by breaking a bottle of champagne over one of the chairs. An estimated crowd of 2,000 stayed to see a parade, fireworks and ski jumping demonstrations. The ceremony and the day are considered to have finally ended Aspen's "quiet years" between its mining boomtown beginnings and its current cachet as an upscale all-season resort popular with the rich and famous.

A year later the lift was featured in a Popular Mechanics cover story as an engineering marvel. As its builders had hoped, it spurred the development of the ski area. Over the next two decades the surrounding blocks were rapidly developed with lodges and chalets. New lifts were built, and at the end of the 1971 season Ski Lift No. 1 was closed.

It was replaced by a new double chair, Lift 1A, which was also based nearby. Lift 1A only went half the distance its predecessor had, requiring a second lift change to get to the top of the mountain, and eventually it was removed and replaced after Aspen built a gondola all the way to the summit from a new base station several blocks to the east. In 1999 the trees and shrubs that had grown in around Lift 1's base station were replaced to reveal the original structure.

It is one of four extant single-chair lifts in the United States. (Note: Aspen's is the only one no longer in use. The other two, besides Sun Valley, are one of Sun Valley's former lifts at Alaska's Mt. Eyak, and at Mad River Glen in Vermont, where the original lift was modernized in the late 2000s.) The area in front of the lift's bottom station has been named Willoughby Park after Frank Willoughby, and for a while one of the original lift boats was on display. A commemorative plaque has been affixed to the bottom station. The Aspen Historical Society has proposed a skiing museum in the area, possibly including some of the surrounding buildings and the lift itself.

== Operation ==
The ride to the base of Lift No. 2 took, former instructor Klaus Obermeyer recalls, a half hour if it was uninterrupted, which frequently it was not. A local journalist recalls singing "Nearer My God to Thee" on the way up to kill the time. Blankets were attached to the chairs to keep skiers warm; many nevertheless stopped in the warming hut at the top station before continuing to the summit. Lift No. 2 was less stringently designed and the wheels the cables ran through were right above passengers, often dripping oil and grease on them. The resort promised passengers it would dry clean any clothing stained by those drippings; Obermeyer says it had to do a lot of dry cleaning.

Occasionally a dog rode up the chair. According to Obermeyer, Bingo, a St. Bernard belonging to another instructor, Fred Iselin, often climbed the mountain to join his master and the other instructors for lunch. Sometimes the lift operators let Bingo ride up instead.

== See also ==
- National Register of Historic Places in Pitkin County, Colorado
