= Colorado Silver Boom =

Period of silver mining activity in Colorado, U.S.

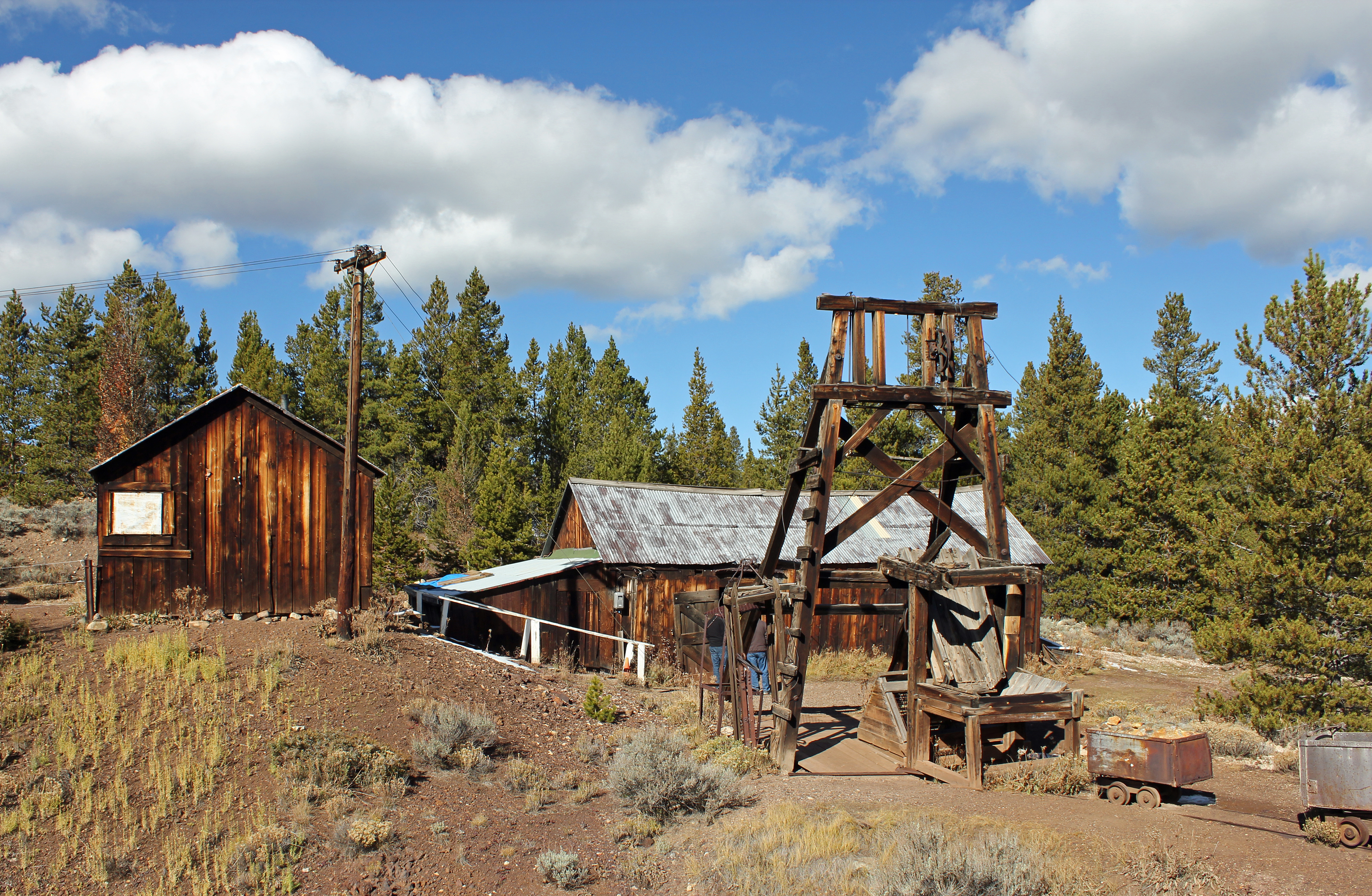
The Matchless Mine in Leadville, originally owned by Horace Tabor, known as "The Silver King".

The Colorado Silver Boom was a dramatic expansionist period of silver mining activity in the U.S. state of Colorado in the late 19th century. The boom started in 1879 with the discovery of silver at Leadville. Over 82 million dollars' worth of silver was mined during the period, making it the second great mineral boom in the state, and coming 20 years after the earlier and shorter Colorado Gold Rush of 1859. The boom was largely the consequence of large-scale purchases of silver by the United States Government authorized by Congress in 1878. The boom endured throughout the 1880s, resulting in an intense increase in both the population and wealth of Colorado, especially in the mountains. It came to an end in 1893 in the wake of the collapse of silver prices caused by the repeal of Sherman Silver Purchase Act.

Silver had been discovered in Colorado in the 1860s, with early mining in Clear Creek Canyon at Georgetown in 1864. In the early days, the mineral was overshadowed by gold, and the low price of mineral meant that most mines were not profitable enough to operate. In 1878, responding to pressure from western interests, the United States Congress passed the Bland–Allison Act authorizing the free coinage of silver. The government demand raised the price of the metal to the point where many additional mines were profitable. The discovery of the Leadville district the following year resulted in a flood of new immigrant prospectors to many of the same mountain gullies that had been the site of the gold rush. The resulting opulence was most lavish in Leadville itself. The repeal of the Sherman Act in 1893 conversely led to a collapse of silver prices, bringing an end to the boom as.

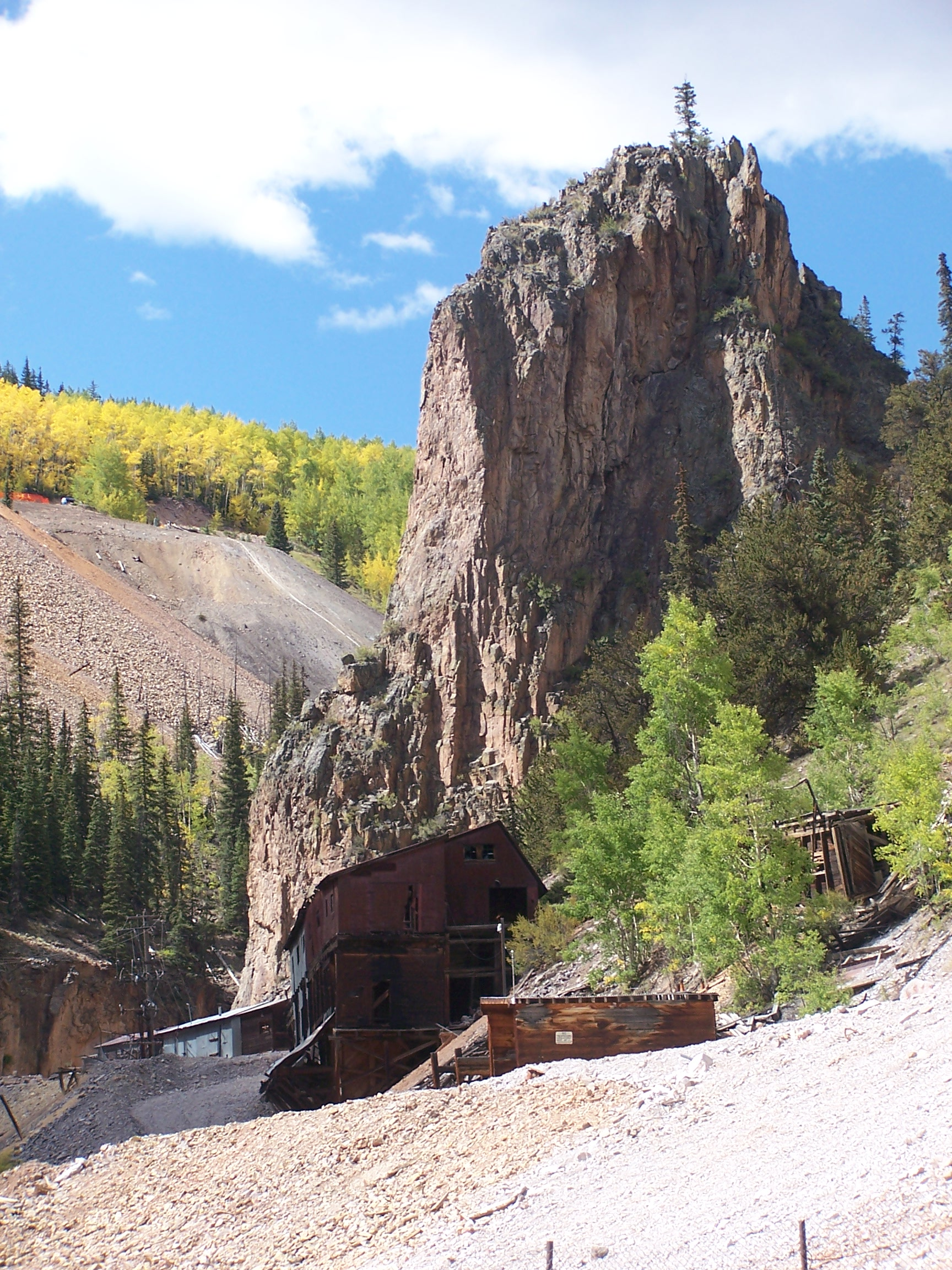
The Amethyst Mine, near Creede, Colorado

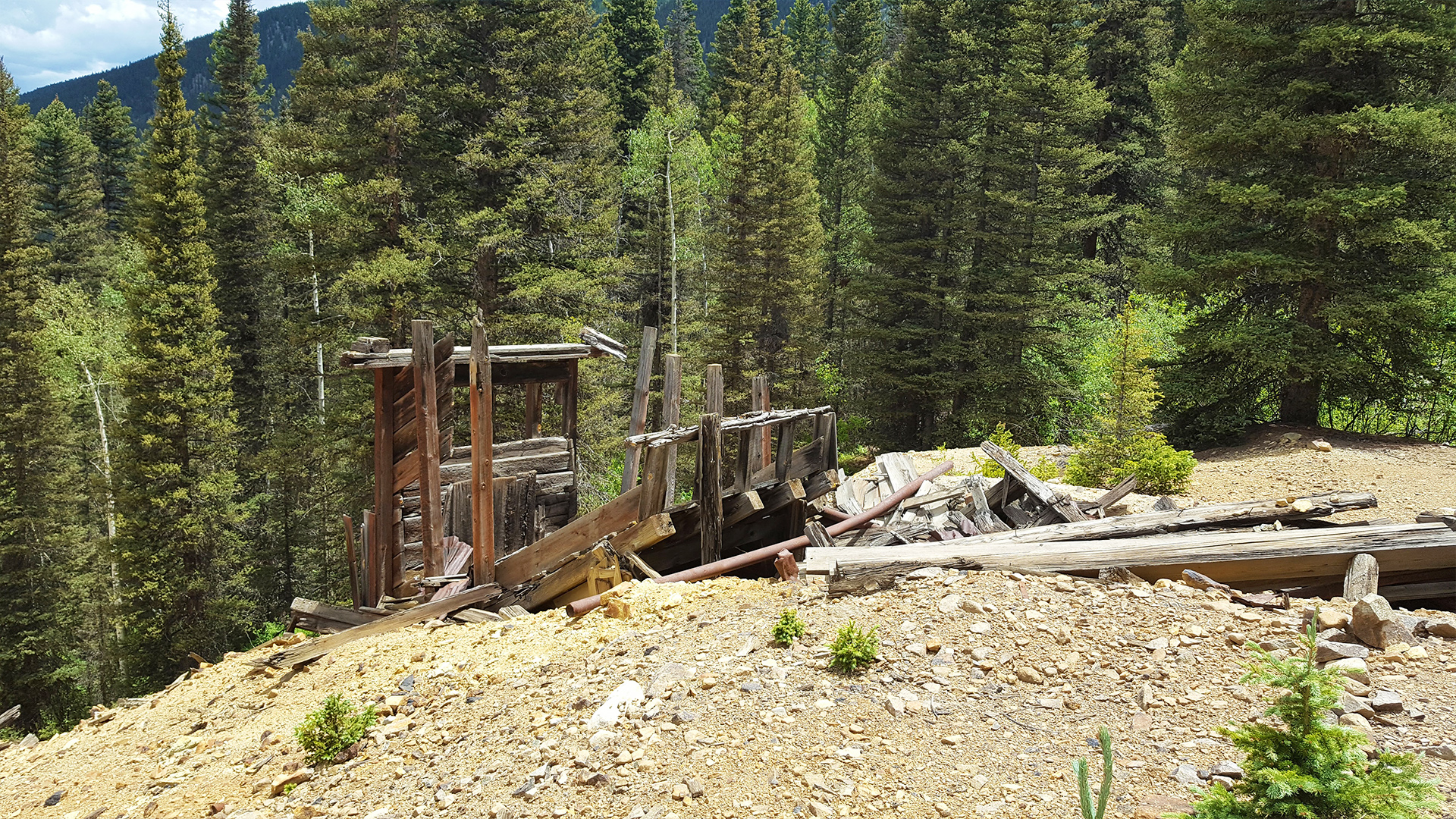
Remains of an abandoned mine near Silverton, Colorado, in July 2020

Beginning in 1889, Creede, Colorado was the site of another big silver boom. The first discovery was made at the Alpha mine in 1869, but the silver could not be extracted at a profit from the complex ores. The great “Boom Days” started with the discovery of rich minerals in Willow Creek Canyon. The town leapt from a population of 600 in 1889 to more than 10,000 people in December 1891. The mines operated continuously until 1995. Creede was the last silver boom town in Colorado in the 19th century.

The boom continued unabated throughout the 1880s and early 1890s, years that gave the state many of the historic structures in its cities and towns. The boom also drove many extensions of the railway network in the mountains, including such lines as the Denver, South Park and Pacific, which built an early narrow-gauge line to Leadville. Likewise the extension of the railroad network up the Roaring Fork Valley to the previously failed mining town of Aspen in the late 1880s made the extraction of silver ore there economically feasible, and saved the town from near extinction.

The government purchases of silver were subsequently nearly doubled by the 1890 Sherman Silver Purchase Act, further extending the boom into the early 1890s. The repeal of the act in 1893 resulted in a collapse of silver prices, bringing about an end to the boom. After 1893, many mining camps became ghost towns. The accompanying collapse in statewide economic activity was ameliorated somewhat by the simultaneous emergence of agriculture, previously derided as not feasible, as a large component of the state economy.

The working conditions inside the mines were often very dangerous. Silicosis, which at the time was incurable, ruined miners' lungs quickly. Many other hazards existed. Apart from the lanterns or tallow candles the miners carried, the mines were otherwise completely dark. Miners at the time were also subject to the threat of tunnel collapse, flooding, and the lack of oxygen in the deeper areas of the mines. Often the miners brought caged canaries down with them; when the bird passed out, it indicated that the oxygen levels were dangerously low in the area. Mines were commonly very small and tightly spaced to save on the cost, effort, and time it would take to expand the tunnels, and so resulted in the use of people of smaller stature and even children.

== See also ==
- Leadville Miners' Strike
- Leadville mining district
- Silver mining in Colorado
- Gold mining in Colorado
