= Joseph Helm =

American judge (1848–1915)

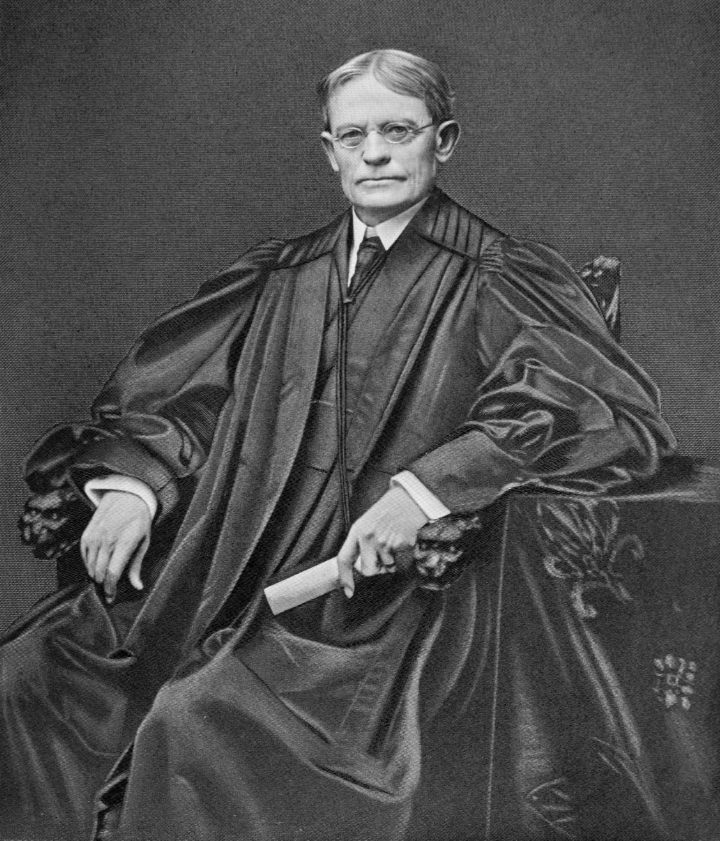

Chief justice of the Colorado Supreme Court
- In office 1889–1892

Justice of the Colorado Supreme Court
- In office 1882–1892

Justice of the Colorado Supreme Court
- In office 1907–1909
- Appointed by: Governor Henry Augustus Buchtel

Personal details
- Born: Joseph Church Helm; June 30, 1848 Chicago, Illinois, US
- Died: May 13, 1915 (aged 66) Denver, Colorado, US
- Resting place: Fairmount Cemetery
- Occupation: State representative, state senator, chief justice of the supreme court

Joseph Church Helm (June 30, 1848 – May 13, 1915) was a jurist from Colorado. He served as a Colorado state representative, a Colorado state senator, and as an associate justice and chief justice of the Colorado Supreme Court. He ran for governor in 1892 and was defeated by Davis Hanson Waite.

At the age of 13, he enlisted as a drummer boy in the Union Army during the Civil War. Over four years, he saw numerous battles and then was a captured and held at the Belle Isle Prisoner Camp, when he was released in 1863, he became private. He stayed in the war until its end, when he was 17 years of age. He saved his pay from his service to pay for his college education.

== Early life ==
Helm was born in Chicago on June 30, 1848, to Sarah (Bass) from Canada and Ruggles Helm from New York. The family moved to Prescott, Ontario, soon after Helm was born. In 1854, they moved to Iowa. Both his mother and father's families served during the American Revolutionary War.

== Civil War ==
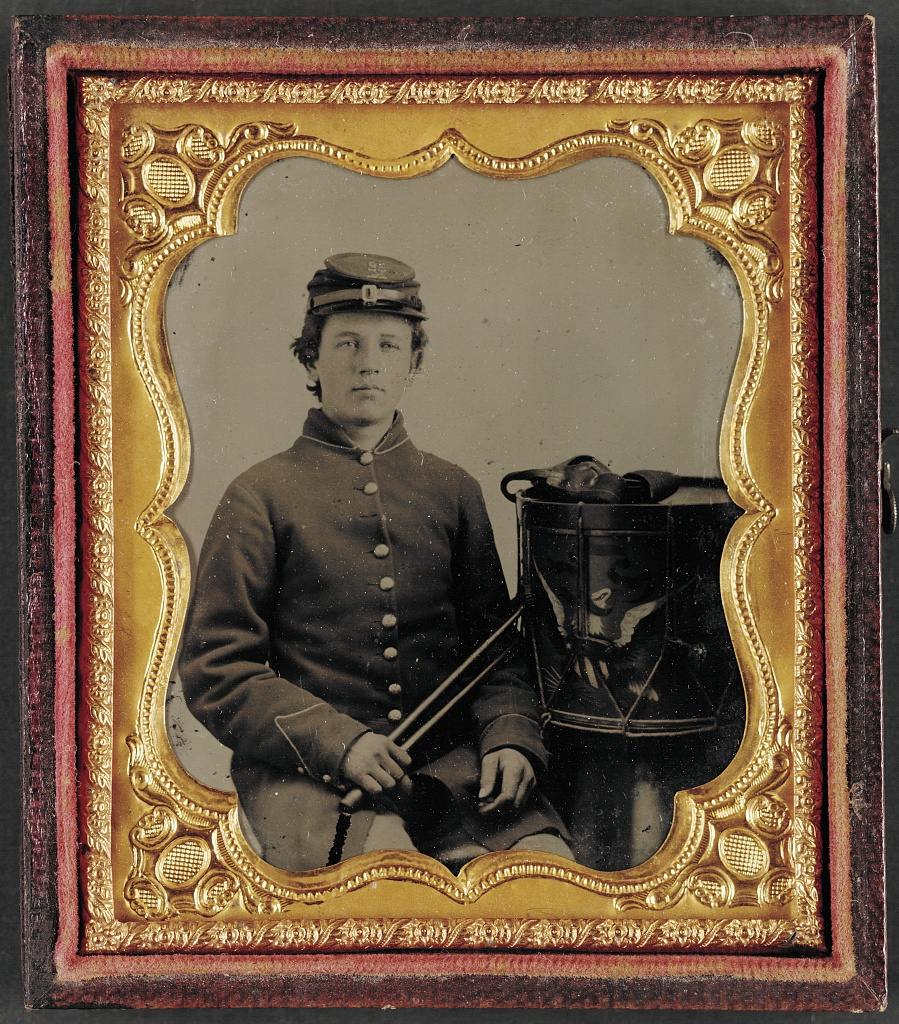
Unidentified young drummer boy in Union uniform

At the age of 13, he signed up as a drummer boy during the Civil War (1861–1865). He was first with the 13th Infantry Regiment on the Union side in the Civil War. He next served with the 6th Infantry Regiment. Led by General Winfield Scott Hancock, it was also called Hancock's Corps. He also served in the Armies of the Tennessee and the Potomac. Some of the battles he served in were Chickasaw Bayou, Champion Hill, Vicksburg, and Collierville. He was held at the Belle Isle Prisoner Camp for three months when he was a prisoner of war. He was released in 1863 and was made a private. He served for four years until the end of the war, when he was 17. He saved his pay during the war to pay for his education.

== Career and education ==
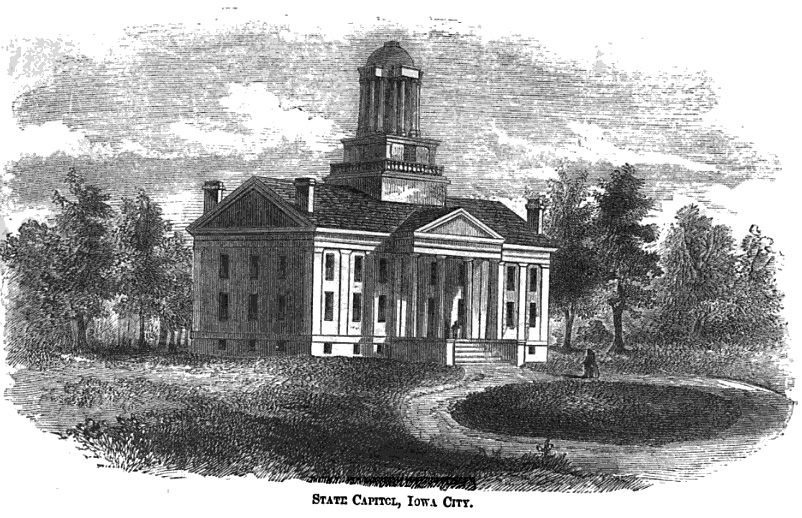
Iowa Old Capitol Building at the center of the University of Iowa campus, Iowa City, 1855

He attended University of Iowa and was a member of Phi Kappa Psi in the class of 1871. (Note: He is said to have been in the class of 1871 at the University of Iowa, but several sources say that he graduated in 1870 or that he started teaching in 1870.) He then taught and became a superintendent in the Arkansas schools of Van Buren and Little Rock until 1873. While he was an educator, he also studied for the bar. He returned to the University of Iowa in 1873 and earned an LL B. degree in 1874. He was the second in a class of 74 students. He moved to Colorado Springs, Colorado, where he was admitted to the bar in 1875. In 1890, he received an honorary Doctor of Law (LLD) from the University of Iowa.

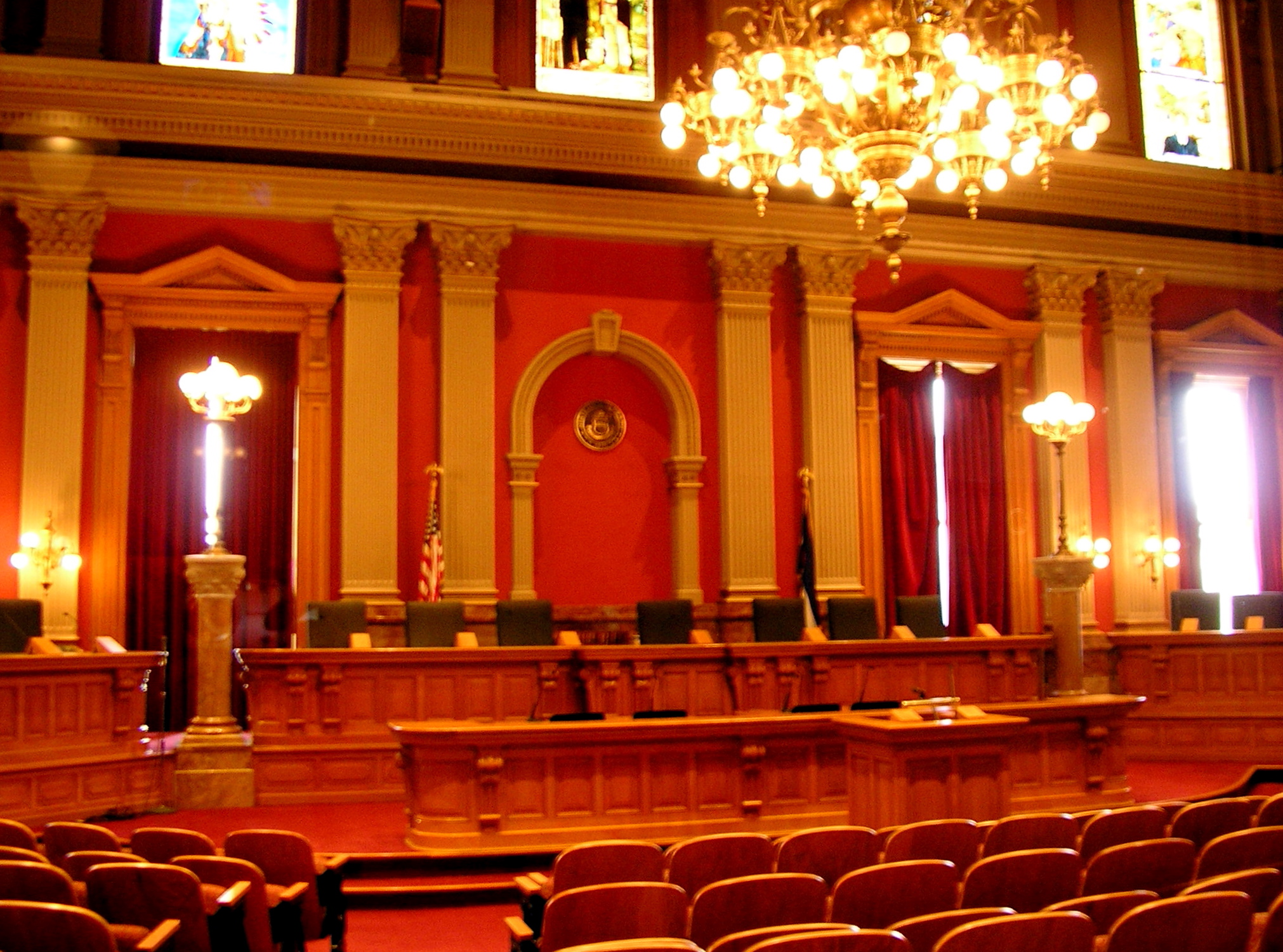
Old Supreme Court in the Colorado State Capitol, Denver

Helm began working as a lawyer in Colorado Springs, Colorado, in 1875. He was elected to the Colorado House of Representatives in 1877 and to the State Senate in 1879, representing El Paso County in both offices. He became a district judge in 1880. He was elected to the Colorado Supreme Court in 1882 and re-elected in 1891. He served as chief justice from 1889 to 1892. Helm resigned from the supreme court in 1892 to run for Governor of Colorado as a Republican. He was his party's nominee but was defeated by Populist Party politician Davis Hanson Waite.

Helm practiced law until his death, except for a period from 1907 to 1909 when he was appointed by Governor Henry Augustus Buchtel to fill a vacancy on the Supreme Court. As an attorney, he represented the interests of the Moffat Tunnel, Moffat estate and Moffat railway. Another client, beginning in 1904, was the Chicago, Rock Island and Pacific Railroad. He had an office in the Equitable Building.

== Personal life ==
He married on September 27, 1881, to Marcia Stewart of Wisconsin. Her family moved to Colorado Springs in 1874 for her father George H. Stewart's health. They did not have any children. Her sister was Alice Stewart Hill, the wife of Francis B. Hill, was an artist and art instructor of Colorado Springs.

Helm was a member of a number of organizations. He died May 13, 1915, at his home in Denver and is buried in there in the Fairmount Cemetery in a large mausoleum, where he was interred following public funeral services in Denver. After Joseph died, Marcia lived part of the time with her sister Hattie in Colorado Springs. Marcia died in 1932 and is also buried in the mausoleum at Fairmount Cemetery.

Those who knew Judge Helm most intimately most appreciated his gentlemanly qualities and kindness of heart. It can truly be said of him, that he was a courteous gentleman, an honorable patriotic citizen, an able conscientious lawyer, a just judge and a true friend.

— Cyrus Beard, "Death of Judge Helm", The Iowa Alumnus.

== Notes ==
Party political offices
| Preceded by John Long Routt | Republican nominee for Governor of Colorado; 1892 | Succeeded by Albert McIntire |
Political offices
| Preceded by William E. Beck | Chief Justice of the Colorado Supreme Court; 1889–1892 | Succeeded by Charles Hayt |
