= Emma Homan Thayer =

American novelist

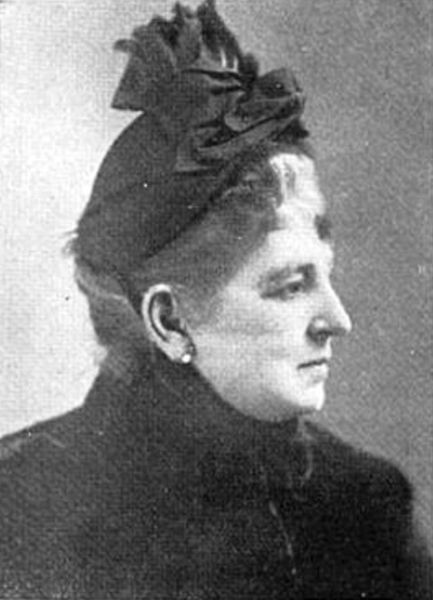
- Emma Homan Thayer, ca. 1897.
- Born: Emma Homan; 1842; New York, New York, U.S.
- Died: 1908 (aged 65–66); Denver, Colorado, U.S.
- Spouse: George A. Graves (1860–64) Elmer A. Thayer (1877–1908)

Emma Homan Thayer (1842–1908) was a 19th-century American botanical artist and author of books about native wildflowers. She also wrote several novels.

== Biography ==
Emma Homan was born in New York City on Feb. 13, 1842, the daughter of George Wand and Emma Homan. Her father was a businessman and the first person to operate omnibuses on Broadway in New York. A portrait of her as a very young child (ca. 1843) by the painter John Bradley is in the collection of the Metropolitan Museum of Art. It was painted in the village of Wading River on Long Island. Her father moved the family to Omaha, Nebraska, when she was around 15, and a few years later, in 1860, she married George A. Graves, who went on to work for the war department in Washington, D.C. They had two children, Amy (1861–1892) and Byron (b. 1862).

Emma Homan Graves was widowed after only four years of marriage, at which point she decided to pursue higher education. She attended Rutgers Female College for a time and then enrolled at the National Academy of Design, where she studied painting. She became one of the earliest members of the Art Students League of New York. Her figure paintings and still lives were exhibited in New York and elsewhere and won two gold medals.

In 1877 she married again, to Elmer A. Thayer of Massachusetts, who was a manager for hotels on the Denver and Rio Grande lines. They moved to Chicago, Illinois, where she continued her career as a painter. With Thayer, she had two more children, both of whom died rather young (before 1899). In 1882, they moved to Colorado, where she shifted from figure painting to botanical art, focusing on wild flowers native to America depicted in natural settings. Her first book was Wild Flowers of Colorado (1885), illustrated with 24 chromolithographs of her watercolors accompanying a description of her travels throughout the state. It was followed two years later by Wild Flowers of the Pacific Coast, which was similarly framed around a travel narrative. The flowers in both books are painted in a lively, impressionistic style without great attention to scientific detail. Part of the appeal of Thayer's books stemmed from the first-person, diaristic style she used to recount her camping trips and mild adventures in pursuit of unusual flowers in sometimes rugged terrain. In her book on Colorado wild flowers, Thayer was the first person to report that giant helleborine can be found in that state.

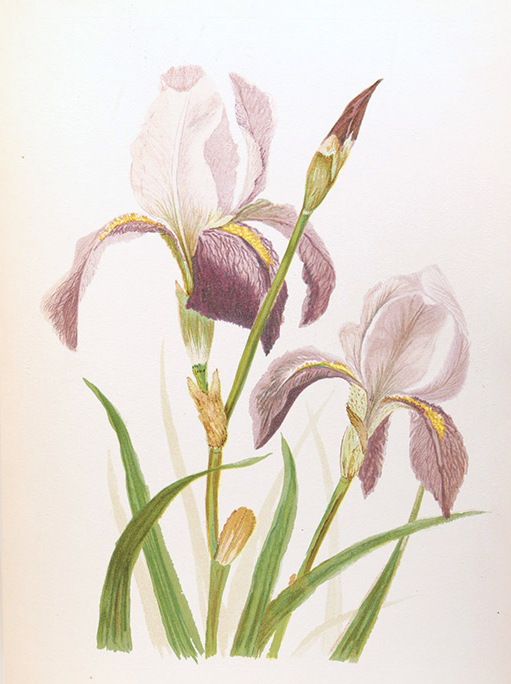
Painting of iris from Emma Homan Thayer's Wild Flowers of Colorado (1885)

In the same year that Wild Flowers of Colorado was published, claims were made that Thayer had based some of her watercolors for the book on sketches made by a Colorado Springs botanical artist, Alice Stewart Hill, rather than on her own drawings. While these claims were strongly contested by people who had actually accompanied Thayer on her trips and seen her at work, it emerged that Thayer had bought some flower studies from Hill and may have borrowed some compositional elements from Hill's work. There was no lawsuit, however, so the extent of Thayer's borrowing from Hill was never fully settled. In 1889, Thayer published a new edition of Wild Flowers of Colorado under the title Wild Flowers of the Rocky Mountains; the only changes were to the cover and title page. It has been suggested that this alteration was made so that it would not compete so directly with Alice Hill's 1886 book The Procession of Flowers in Colorado.

Thayer also wrote several novels, including An English-American (1889), Petronilla, the Sister (1898), A Legend of Glenwood Springs (1900), and Dorothy Scudder's Science (1901). All of her books sold well, and many of them went through numerous editions. However, The Mortgage Foreclosed: A Story of the Farm (1890?), though written by an E.H. Thayer, is apparently not her work. She stated that the author of that novel had used her initials as well as some of her characters in order to market it, falsely, as "Mrs Thayer's new book".

Thayer died in Denver, Colorado, in 1908.
