= 1876 Colorado gubernatorial election =

- October 3, 1876
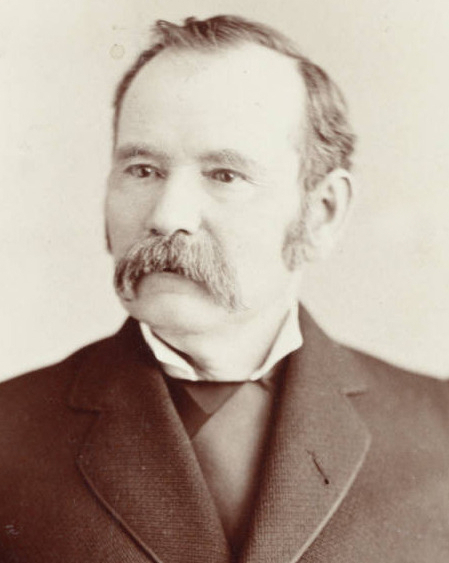

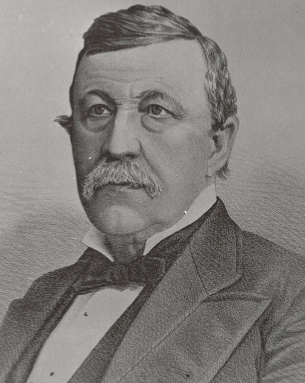
Nominee	John Long Routt	Bela M. Hughes
Party	Republican	Democratic
Popular vote	14,154	13,316
Percentage	51.53%	48.47%
- County results: Routt: 50–60% 60–70% Hughes: 50–60% 60–70%
Governor before election
Office established
Elected Governor
John Long Routt
Republican

The 1876 Colorado gubernatorial election took place on October 3, 1876, to elect the 1st Governor of Colorado after the state was admitted to the union on August 1, 1876. Republican John Long Routt, last governor of the Colorado Territory, was elected in a close race against Democratic nominee Bela M. Hughes.

== Background ==
=== Political turmoil in the Colorado Territory from 1874 to 1875 ===
In January 1874, Edward M. McCook, who already had been territorial Governor from 1869 to 1873, was appointed for another term by President Ulysses S. Grant after incumbent Governor Samuel Elbert had been removed due to misconduct in the Land Office in Pueblo. Elbert had supporters that claimed he should not have been relieved from his office because he was not involved in any misconduct. McCook, whose first administration was considered tainted by corruption, was also fiercely opposed by Jerome B. Chaffee, an Elbert supporter, who was the Territory's Delegate to the House of Representative at the time. Many in the territory saw McCook's appointment as an affront. The battle for his Senate confirmation turned into a feud between Chaffee and President Grant. Chaffee even threatened to resign if McCook was confirmed in the Senate. After five months of testimony and multiple accusations against McCook, the Senate confirmed his appointment on June 19, 1874, by a one-vote majority.

After he had returned to Colorado, Governor McCook asked President Grant to relieve all political appointees from their duties, which had been recommended by Delegate Chaffee. President Grant complied and appointed replacements that all lived outside the territory. McCook and those other federal officers were considered carpetbaggers by the local population. There was a growing a sentiment in the territory, that the federal offices were used to place unsuccessful and no longer needed politicians from the east of the United States. A growing dissatisfaction with the Republican president, his local appointees and the infighting in the Republican party led to the surprising victory of Democrat Thomas M. Patterson in the election for Delegate to the House of Representatives on November 3, 1874.

Edward M. McCook's second term as Governor was not successful and lasted just eight months. His administration was plagued by infighting in the Republican Party and McCook's personal problems. McCook was distraught by the death of his wife Mary and suffered from alcoholism. His lack of moral conduct cost him a lot of support and in February 1875 he resigned at the request of President Grant.

=== John Long Routt's term as last Territorial Governor ===
On March 29, 1875, Republican John Long Routt was appointed by President Grant as to replace the unpopular Edward McCook as Governor of the Territory of Colorado. President Grant and John Routt had been close friends since their serving together for the Union in the Civil War.

Routt's first task was to unite the local Republican party after years of infighting. He also needed to solve a growing disconnect between the inhabitants of Denver and the inhabitants of more rural areas in the territory. Many rural Coloradions believed that the gridlock and infighting in the years prior had been caused by a strong concentration of power for Denver politicians. At first, Routt had to deal with skepticism because he had also been appointed to the office without ever living in Colorado before. He reassured the public by stating that he planned to move to the territory even if he had not been appointed as Governor. His term as territorial Governor was dominated by the crafting of the first State Constitution of Colorado by the 1875 constitutional convention. Routt also succeeded in uniting the factions of the local Republican party.

=== Colorado's final push for statehood ===
In the 1860s, the Colorado Territory, which had been created in 1861, was already relatively close to statehood. A Republican-dominated congress had passed an enabling act in 1864, that was signed by President Abraham Lincoln. The first proposed state constitution was voted down by the voters of the territory on October 11, 1864. A second proposal for a state constitution was then ratified by the voters on August 12, 1865. President Andrew Johnson, who had come into office after Lincoln's assassination, opposed statehood for the Colorado Territory fearing a strengthened Republican majority. During his term, President Johnson successfully blocked all further attempts by Congress to force statehood for the territory. After Johnson left office in 1869, Congress failed to pass a statehood bill on three separate occasions in between 1869 and 1873.

The appointment saga around Governor McCook had shown the population of the territory the need for self-government and contributed to a strong effort towards statehood. An act of Congress was again necessary for statehood. After the 1874 United States elections, control of the 44th Congress was divided, with Republicans still firmly in control of the Senate but Democrats with a newly gained majority in the House. National Democrats had long been opposed to statehood for the Colorado Territory fearing that statehood would add a solid Republican state to the Union. Newly elected Delegate Thomas M. Patterson, who was a strong proponent of statehood, worked on convincing Democrats in Congress that Colorado would elect Democratic members to Congress. Patterson pointed to his own election as proof. On the Republican side, former Delegate Jerome B. Chaffee, also a statehood proponent, made sure that Republican member of Congress would remain convinced that Colorado would vote Republican and that they supported the party's line. Republicans pushed statehood through the 43rd Congress in the last days of its term, as the Democrats would take over control of the House of Representatives after the 44th Congress was sworn in on March 4, 1875.

The United States Congress passed an enabling act on March 3, 1875, specifying the requirements for the Territory of Colorado to become a state. On August 1, 1876, U.S. President Ulysses S. Grant signed a proclamation admitting the state of Colorado to the Union as the 38th state and earning it the moniker "Centennial State". The borders of the new state coincided with the borders that had been established for the Colorado Territory.

Congressional votes on the Colorado Enabling Act on February 24, 1875 (Senate) and March 3, 1875 (House)
	U.S. Senate			U. S. House of Representatives		
	Yes	No	Not voting	Yes	No	Not voting
Democrats	2	16	2	10	67	14
Republicans	45	1	7	154	16	27
Totals	47	17	9	164	83	41

=== Colorado's State Constitution ===
The enabling act laid out the process for the attempt at the first state constitution for Colorado. The territorial governor was authorized to call an election for 39 delegates within 90 days of September 1, 1875 which had to convene for the convention within 60 days of such elections. The crafted would have to be ratified by a referendum in July 1876. The enabling act had included a section stating that only those eligible to vote in territorial elections could vote in the referendum and in the prior elections for delegates to the constitutional convention. This meant that, due to territorial statue of 1868, only white males over the age of 21 were allowed to vote. The act also included constraints for the future state constitution. It specified that the constitution could make no "civil or political distinction on the account of race or color" and that it had to "tolerate all religious sentiments".

Governor John Routt ordered elections for representatives in a Constitutional Convention, which were held on October 25, 1875. Republicans won 24 seats, while the Democrats won just 15 seats. The convention convened in Denver on December 20, 1875. The most hotly contested issues were the regulation of railroads, mines and other companies, women's suffrage, funding for denominational schools and whether God should be mentioned in the preamble.

The state constitution gave black men over the age of 21 the right to vote in state, while women's suffrage was also proposed but defeated in a 28–4 vote. Delegates were afraid that territory's male electorate was against women's suffrage and that including it would doom the constitutions and thus statehood in the referendum. The fear of corruption due to the strong influence of private mining and railroad companies in the state defined many choices of the convention. The term length of Governors was set at just two years to give voters an early opportunity to reject unpopular administration. Article V, Section 25, prohibited the passing of any laws benefiting just one company and Sections 27 and 28 provided ethics standards for legislators. The constitution is also very long due to detailed instructions and restrictions of the legislative abilities of the Colorado General Assembly. The intent here was to curb the ability of business leaders to enact laws through their influence over legislators.

The constitution passed the convention on March 14, 1876, in a unanimous vote of 30–0, with nine delegates absent. Due to provisions in the enabling act, the ratification referendum could not be held until July 1876. The new constitution was finally ratified by a vote of the people on July 1, 1876. The vote margin was 15,443-4,039 (79%-21%) in favor of the constitution. Only four counties, El Paso, Huerfano, Las Animas and Pueblo, voted against the constitution. At the time, the residents of those counties were mostly of Mexican heritage and the results showed their dissatisfaction with the constitution and their mistrust towards the majority Anglo-American population.

== Republican primary ==
=== Candidates ===
==== Nominated ====
- John Long Routt, Governor of the Colorado Territory

==== Eliminated at Convention ====
- George M. Chilcott, former Delegate to the United States House of Representatives (1867–1869)
- Samuel Hitt Elbert, former Governor of the Colorado Territory (1873–1874)
- Lafayette Head, Member of the Colorado Territorial Council

=== State Convention ===
The Republican convention was held on August 23, 1876, in Pueblo. Jerome B. Chaffee, who was considered the leader of the local Republican party, chaired the convention. When the convention convened in the morning of August 23, it was uncertain who the state party would choose as their first nominee for Governor.

Former Governor Samuel Hitt Elbert still enjoyed significant support among the delegates and the party leaders. Elbert was considered the favorite for the nomination. His removal from office in 1874 had caused widespread solidarity and his candidacy was supported by Chaffee. Incumbent Governor John Long Routt had still to fight against his image as an outsider and "carpetbagger". Although, Routt had gained respect among Republicans for successfully uniting the factions within the party. Lafayette Head was a candidate who had strong support among the delegates from the Hispanic-majority southern part of the new state but a limited appeal outside his geographic base. George M. Chilcott was another candidate who was seen favorably by the party's establishment.

After four rounds of balloting had ended without a candidate receiving a majority of the delegates' votes (see below), John Routt struck a deal with Lafayette Head and Samuel Elbert. Head joined Routt on the Republican ticket as the nominee for Lieutenant Governor, while Elbert accepted a nomination in the elections for the Colorado Supreme Court.

1876 Republican State Convention
Party	1st Ballot	%	2nd Ballot	%	3rd Ballot	%	4th Ballot	%
George M. Chilcott	4	2.8	18	12.4	23	16.4	20	17.5
Samuel Hitt Elbert	51	35.2	62	42.8	53	37.9	40	35.1
Lafayette Head	58	40.0	64	44.1	40	28.6	34	29.8
John Long Routt	32	22.1	1	0.7	24	17.1	20	17.5
Totals	145	100.0	145	100.0	140	100.0	114	100.0

== Democratic primary ==
=== Candidates ===
==== Nominated ====
- Bela M. Hughes, Member of the Colorado Territorial Council

=== Democratic nominee ===
In February 1876, Bela M. Hughes was already rumored to be the likely first Democratic nominee for governor.

Bela M. Hughes was born in Carlisle, Kentucky in 1817. He had worked as a transportation businessman, developer, and attorney in Missouri and Kansas. In Missouri, Hughes had also served in the Missouri House of Representatives and had been appointed Receiver of Public Moneys by President John Tyler. He moved to Denver in 1862. He practiced as an attorney in the city and was the first president of the Denver Pacific Railway and Telegraph Company. In 1875, he was elected to the Territorial Council, the upper house of the Colorado Territory legislature.

On 29 August, the Democratic convention met in Manitou Springs to nominate candidates for the first state elections on 3 October. Hughes was nominated for governor by acclamation.

== General election ==
=== Campaign ===
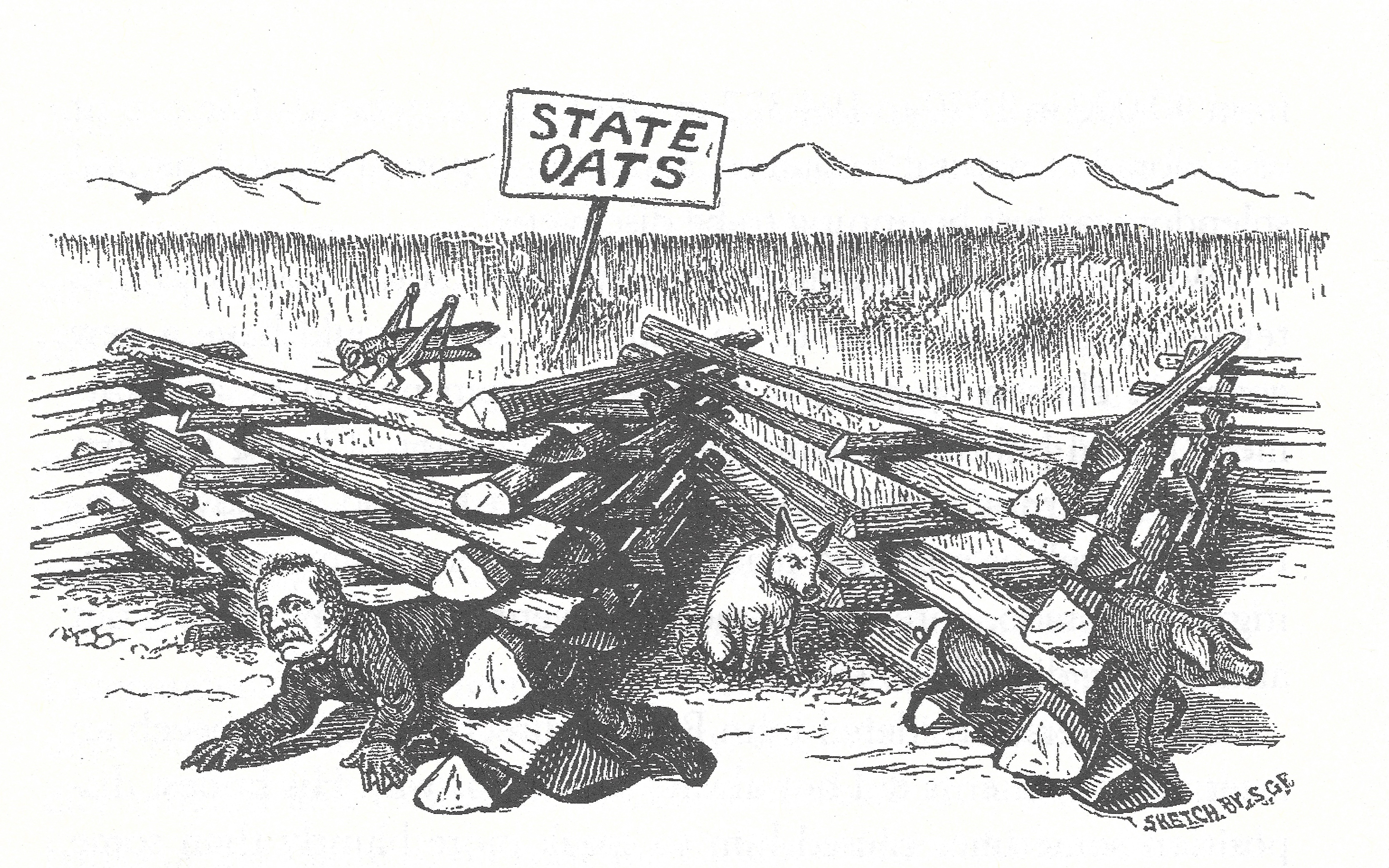
A political cartoon by the Denver Mirror, ridiculing territorial Governor John Routt.

The slightly over one month long campaign began right after the conventions in the end of August 1876. Both nominees had very different styles of campaigning. The Democratic Nominee Bela M. Hughes hold many speeches presenting his platform. In the first three weeks of September 1876 alone, he travelled for campaign events to 15 different Colorado cities, speaking up to six nights per week. The Republican newspaper Golden Weekly Globe, published an extensive report on Hughes's speech in Golden. In their report, the newspaper alleged that Democratic presidential nominee Samuel J. Tilden had committed perjury and criticized Hughes for his defense and support of Tilden. The editorial also criticized Hughes' language, as he used phrases like "damned lie" and "the government is going to hell", despite the fact that there were around twenty women in the audience. On the other hand, Democratic newspapers enthusiastically supported Hughes' candidacy. This was especially the case with the Denver Mirror, a small newspaper which was published by Stanley G. Fowler.

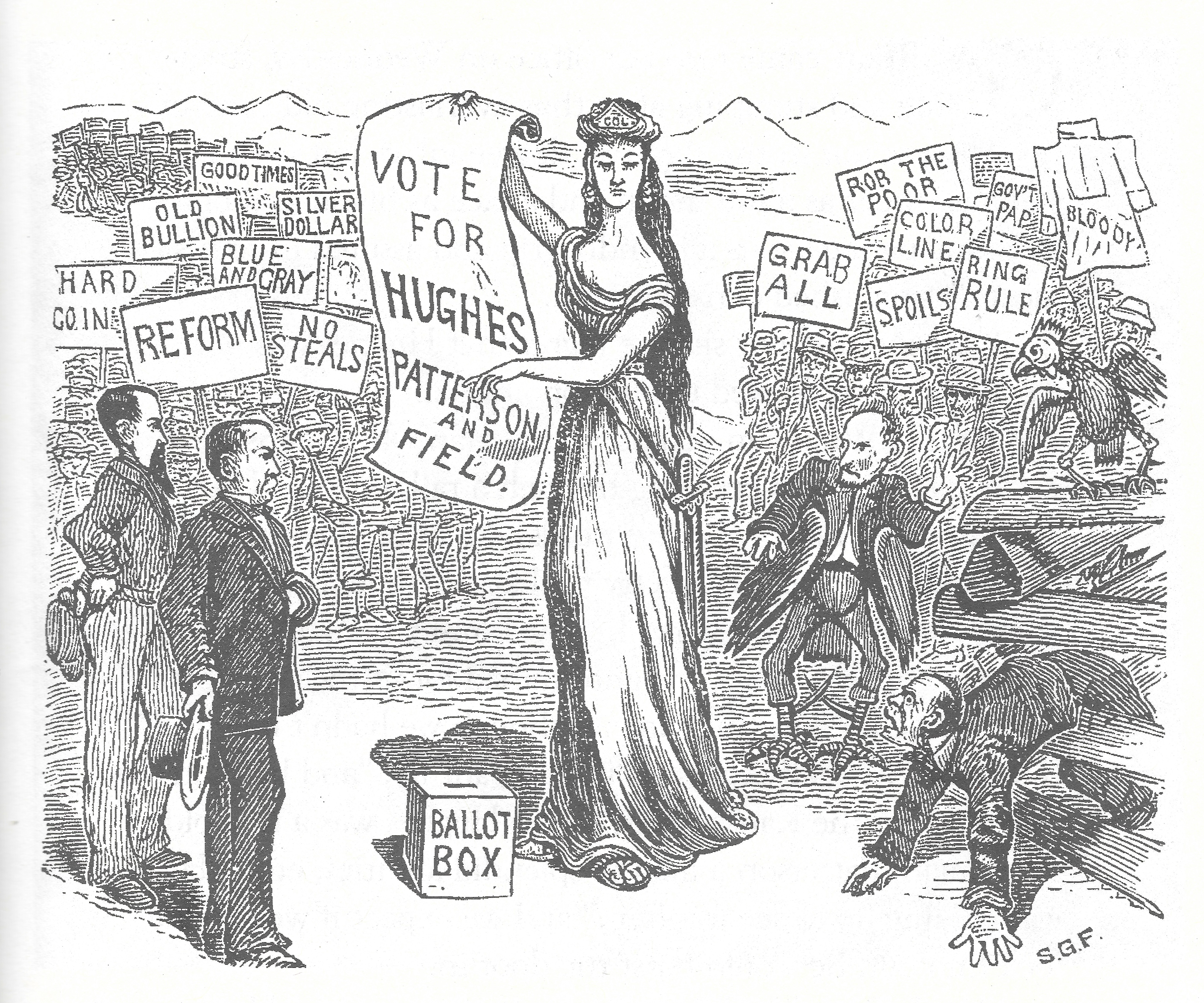
A political cartoon by the Denver Mirror, encouraging its readers to support Bela M. Hughes for Governor. Hughes is the second from the right, his opponent Gov. Routt is on the right between the fences.

The Republican nominee, Territorial Governor John Routt, did not make any public speeches during the campaign. He preferred to meet and greet voters face-to-face. At one Republican event, Routt acknowledged that he was not using rhetorical skills like his opponent. He said: "I cannot soar as high as some of my friends on the other side, but I am short and spry, and when it comes to getting into the political pastures I can get in just as quickly as they by crawling through; perhaps I can beat them in, for they have to soar high to avoid the fences." The Denver Mirror then used the image of Routt crawling through the fences to paint him in multiple cartoons as a carpetbagger, who had not been elected but appointed to the territorial governorship by President Grant after serving in different political roles in Illinois and Washington, DC. The first cartoon was published on September 17, 1876. Fowler was successful with his cartoons, which were received attention across the whole state. Routt was amused by the caricatures and began to distribute copies of them at his campaign events. In its last cartoon concerning the 1876 State Elections on October 1, 1876, the Denver Mirror called its readers to support Hughes and other Democratic candidates, stressing their support for the Silver Dollar and political reforms, while alleging that a Republican state government would be tainted by corruption.

=== Results ===
Routt was able to secure another term in office as Republicans managed to sweep all statewide offices and both chambers of the Colorado General Assembly. Routt won the gubernatorial election by 14,154 to 13,316 votes, a 52–48 margin.

==== Overview ====
1876 Colorado gubernatorial election
Party	Candidate	Votes	%
Republican	John Long Routt	14,154	51.53%
Democratic	Bela M. Hughes	13,316	48.47%
Total votes		27,470	100.00%
Republican hold			

==== By county ====
Source: 1877 Legislative Manual of the State of Colorado.

County	Routt %	Routt #	Hughes %	Hughes #	Total
Arapahoe	54.76%	2,173	45.24%	1,795	3,968
Bent	36.28%	250	63.72%	439	689
Boulder	58.41%	1,539	41.59%	1,096	2,635
Clear Creek	50.97%	1,072	49.03%	1,031	2,103
Conejos	61.00%	341	39.00%	218	559
Costilla	66.98%	351	33.02%	173	524
Douglas	45.85%	282	54.15%	333	615
El Paso	64.23%	713	35.77%	397	1,110
Elbert	41.79%	84	58.21%	117	201
Fremont	49.57%	522	50.43%	531	1,053
Gilpin	56.84%	1,005	43.16%	763	1,768
Grand	33.18%	73	66.82%	147	220
Hinsdale	52.37%	420	47.63%	382	802
Huerfano	40.04%	410	59.96%	614	1,024
Jefferson	47.40%	537	52.60%	596	1,133
La Plata	31.65%	50	68.35%	108	158
Lake	49.46%	229	50.54%	234	463
Larimer	55.49%	374	44.51%	300	674
Las Animas	34.48%	669	65.52%	1,271	1,940
Park	52.36%	465	47.64%	423	888
Pueblo	42.36%	543	57.64%	739	1,282
Rio Grande	50.14%	364	49.86%	362	726
Saguache	61.82%	306	38.18%	189	495
San Juan	48.94%	393	51.06%	410	803
Summit	52.07%	201	47.93%	185	386
Weld	62.99%	788	37.01%	463	1,251

=== Reactions ===
Many Colorado Democrats questioned the accuracy of the election results. Nevertheless, Bela M. Hughes did not approve the calls for a recount and refused to request one despite the closeness of the results.

== Aftermath ==
John Routt was sworn in as Colorado's 1st Governor on November 3, 1876. Routt did not run for reelection in 1878 but served another term as Colorado's as 7th Governor from 1891 to 1893. Additionally, he also served as Denver's 17th Mayor from 1883 to 1885. John Routt died in Denver on August 13, 1907.

After the lost gubernatorial election, Bela Hughes mostly retreated from politics. His advice was still sought but he never ran for public office again. In February 1877, he was suggested by the newspaper Memphis Appeal as United States Secretary of State, in case Democratic nominee Samuel J. Tilden would emerge as the winner of the contested 1876 Presidential election. Hughes focused on his law practice in which he was in 1888 joined by his relative Charles J. Hughes Jr., who went on to represent Colorado as a Democratic member in the United States Senate. Bela Hughes retired from his profession as a lawyer in 1893. Hughes was recognized for his significant contributions to the state in the Colorado Hall of Fame and is depicted in the Colorado State Capitol. Bela Hughes died in his Denver home in the early morning of October 3, 1902.
