= 1892 Colorado gubernatorial election =

- November 8, 1892
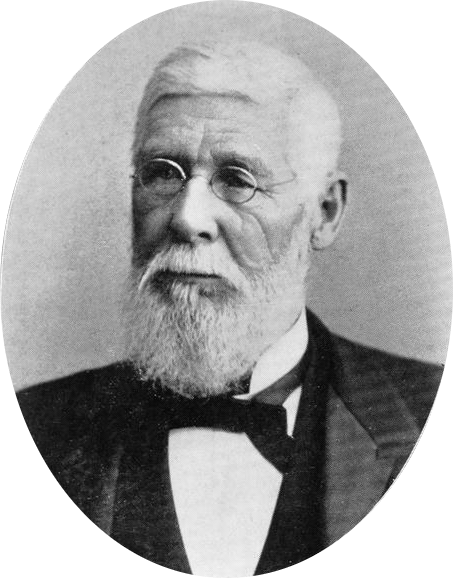

| Nominee | Davis Hanson Waite | Joseph Helm | Joseph H. Maupin |
| Party | Populist | Republican | Democratic |
| Popular vote | 43,342 | 38,806 | 8,944 |
| Percentage | 46.68% | 41.79% | 9.63% |
- County results Waite: 40–50% 50–60% 60–70% 70–80% Helm: 40–50% 50–60% 60–70% Maupin: 40–50%
Governor before election
John Long Routt
Republican
Elected Governor
Davis Hanson Waite
Populist

The 1892 Colorado gubernatorial election was held on November 8, 1892. People's Party nominee Davis Hanson Waite defeated Republican nominee Joseph Helm with 46.68% of the vote.

== General election ==
=== Candidates ===
Major party candidates

- Joseph Helm, Republican
- Joseph H. Maupin, Democratic

Other candidates

- Davis Hanson Waite, People's
- John Hipp, Prohibition

=== Results ===
1892 Colorado gubernatorial election
| Party | Candidate | Votes | % | ±% |
|---|---|---|---|---|
| Populist | Davis Hanson Waite | 43,342 | 46.68% | N/A |
| Republican | Joseph Helm | 38,806 | 41.79% | −8.32% |
| Democratic | Joseph H. Maupin | 8,944 | 9.63% | −32.73% |
| Prohibition | John Hipp | 1,764 | 1.90% | +0.63% |
| Majority | | 4,536 | 4.91% | |
| Turnout | | 92,856 | | |
| Populist gain from Republican | | Swing | | |

| County | Waite % | Waite # | Helm % | Helm # | Maupin % | Maupin # | Hipp % | Hipp # | Total |
|---|---|---|---|---|---|---|---|---|---|
| Arapahoe | 40.03% | 9,393 | 49.35% | 11,578 | 8.54% | 2,004 | 2.06% | 485 | 23,460 |
| Archuleta | 26.14% | 57 | 49.08% | 107 | 24.77% | 54 | 0.00% | 0 | 218 |
| Baca | 42.31% | 135 | 48.27% | 154 | 7.52% | 24 | 1.88% | 6 | 319 |
| Bent | 54.87% | 214 | 41.53% | 162 | 3.07% | 12 | 0.51% | 2 | 390 |
| Boulder | 56.14% | 2,034 | 36.68% | 1,329 | 3.61% | 131 | 3.56% | 129 | 3,623 |
| Chaffee | 52.04% | 867 | 42.25% | 704 | 4.74% | 79 | 0.96% | 16 | 1,666 |
| Cheyenne | 20.13% | 30 | 65.10% | 97 | 14.76% | 22 | 0.00% | 0 | 131 |
| Clear Creek | 75.06% | 1,674 | 23.67% | 528 | 0.40% | 9 | 0.85% | 19 | 2,230 |
| Conejos | 34.59% | 492 | 60.68% | 863 | 4.07% | 58 | 0.63% | 9 | 1,422 |
| Costilla | 26.10% | 213 | 63.72% | 520 | 9.55% | 78 | 0.61% | 5 | 816 |
| Custer | 41.69% | 281 | 44.36% | 299 | 13.50% | 91 | 0.44% | 3 | 674 |
| Delta | 52.86% | 369 | 33.81% | 236 | 11.31% | 79 | 2.00% | 14 | 698 |
| Dolores | 60.04% | 526 | 34.58% | 303 | 4.90% | 43 | 0.45% | 4 | 876 |
| Douglas | 32.50% | 195 | 61.33% | 368 | 5.50% | 33 | 0.66% | 4 | 600 |
| Eagle | 63.78% | 597 | 29.70% | 278 | 6.19% | 58 | 0.32% | 3 | 936 |
| El Paso | 42.07% | 2,324 | 48.34% | 2,670 | 6.55% | 362 | 3.02% | 167 | 5,523 |
| Elbert | 39.85% | 163 | 46.21% | 189 | 12.95% | 53 | 0.97% | 4 | 409 |
| Fremont | 42.09% | 879 | 35.82% | 748 | 19.73% | 412 | 2.34% | 49 | 2,088 |
| Garfield | 43.36% | 572 | 47.76% | 630 | 8.03% | 106 | 0.83% | 11 | 1,319 |
| Gilpin | 59.71% | 762 | 34.79% | 444 | 1.72% | 22 | 3.76% | 48 | 1,276 |
| Grand | 33.33% | 77 | 49.78% | 115 | 16.45% | 38 | 0.43% | 1 | 231 |
| Gunnison | 53.58% | 792 | 39.51% | 584 | 6.22% | 92 | 0.67% | 10 | 1,478 |
| Hinsdale | 68.19% | 1,072 | 27.67% | 435 | 3.88% | 61 | 0.25% | 4 | 1,572 |
| Huerfano | 17.31% | 254 | 48.87% | 717 | 33.53% | 492 | 0.27% | 4 | 1,467 |
| Jefferson | 38.14% | 690 | 43.28% | 783 | 12.38% | 224 | 6.19% | 112 | 1,809 |
| Kiowa | 25.71% | 72 | 55.35% | 155 | 18.21% | 51 | 0.71% | 2 | 280 |
| Kit Carson | 37.34% | 186 | 53.41% | 266 | 8.03% | 40 | 1.20% | 6 | 498 |
| La Plata | 50.97% | 810 | 36.31% | 577 | 11.89% | 189 | 0.81% | 13 | 1,589 |
| Lake | 60.12% | 1,870 | 32.92% | 1,024 | 6.59% | 205 | 0.35% | 11 | 3,110 |
| Larimer | 44.93% | 1,007 | 43.28% | 970 | 6.11% | 137 | 5.66% | 127 | 2,241 |
| Las Animas | 15.53% | 482 | 35.84% | 1,112 | 45.61% | 1,415 | 2.99% | 93 | 3,102 |
| Lincoln | 2.90% | 5 | 65.69% | 112 | 30.23% | 52 | 1.16% | 2 | 172 |
| Logan | 37.09% | 217 | 52.82% | 309 | 8.54% | 50 | 1.53% | 9 | 585 |
| Mesa | 42.22% | 516 | 42.96% | 525 | 8.26% | 101 | 6.54% | 80 | 1,222 |
| Montezuma | 65.99% | 326 | 26.31% | 130 | 7.69% | 38 | 0.00% | 0 | 494 |
| Montrose | 53.77% | 463 | 34.72% | 299 | 10.45% | 90 | 1.04% | 9 | 861 |
| Morgan | 42.22% | 182 | 47.56% | 205 | 9.51% | 41 | 0.69% | 3 | 431 |
| Otero | 46.67% | 533 | 41.68% | 476 | 9.28% | 106 | 2.36% | 27 | 1,142 |
| Ouray | 79.98% | 1,419 | 18.20% | 323 | 1.12% | 20 | 0.67% | 12 | 1,774 |
| Park | 60.15% | 613 | 36.21% | 369 | 3.33% | 34 | 0.29% | 3 | 1,019 |
| Phillips | 38.40% | 207 | 49.16% | 265 | 7.79% | 42 | 4.63% | 25 | 539 |
| Pitkin | 78.22% | 2,508 | 17.28% | 554 | 4.21% | 135 | 0.28% | 9 | 3,206 |
| Prowers | 37.93% | 173 | 49.12% | 224 | 12.50% | 57 | 0.43% | 2 | 456 |
| Pueblo | 36.16% | 1,879 | 45.80% | 2,380 | 16.51% | 858 | 1.52% | 79 | 5,196 |
| Rio Blanco | 42.18% | 143 | 35.10% | 119 | 21.53% | 73 | 1.17% | 4 | 339 |
| Rio Grande | 43.65% | 475 | 48.52% | 528 | 5.79% | 63 | 2.02% | 22 | 1,088 |
| Routt | 24.68% | 158 | 51.56% | 330 | 22.96% | 147 | 0.78% | 5 | 640 |
| Saguache | 59.39% | 531 | 36.46% | 326 | 3.80% | 34 | 0.33% | 3 | 894 |
| San Juan | 79.57% | 448 | 18.65% | 105 | 1.42% | 8 | 0.35% | 2 | 563 |
| San Miguel | 71.91% | 817 | 24.11% | 274 | 3.25% | 37 | 0.70% | 8 | 1,136 |
| Sedgwick | 48.16% | 144 | 44.14% | 132 | 7.02% | 21 | 0.66% | 2 | 299 |
| Summit | 67.13% | 715 | 29.48% | 314 | 2.15% | 23 | 1.22% | 13 | 1,065 |
| Washington | 22.02% | 89 | 60.89% | 246 | 14.35% | 58 | 2.72% | 11 | 404 |
| Weld | 53.49% | 1,453 | 41.56% | 1,129 | 2.61% | 71 | 2.31% | 63 | 2,716 |
| Yuma | 43.77% | 239 | 34.06% | 186 | 20.32% | 111 | 1.83% | 10 | 546 |

Counties that flipped from Democratic to Republican

- Archuleta

Counties that flipped from Democratic to Populist

- Eagle
- Lake
- Montezuma
- Otero
- Rio Blanco
- Park
- Pitkin
- San Miguel
- Summit

Counties that flipped from Republican to Populist

- Bent
- Boulder
- Chaffee
- Clear Creek
- Dolores
- Fremont
- Gilpin
- Gunnison
- Hinsdale
- La Plata
- Larimer
- Ouray
- Saguache
- San Juan
- Sedgwick
- Weld
- Yuma

Counties that flipped from Labor to Populist

- Delta
- Montrose
