= Bela M. Hughes =

American lawyer, businessman and politician

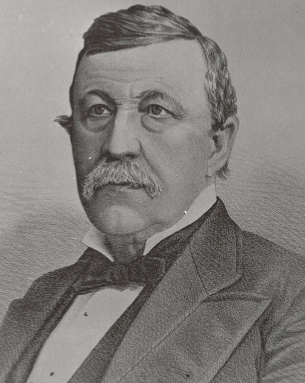

Member of the Colorado Territorial Council from the 1st district
- In office January 3, 1876 – August 1, 1876 Serving with Baxter B. Stiles
- Preceded by: Henry P. H. Bromwell and R. G. Buckingham
- Succeeded by: Office eliminated

Member of the Missouri House of Representatives from the Platte County district
- In office November 18, 1844 – January 28, 1845
- Preceded by: Bethel Allen
- Succeeded by: Lewis Calvert

Personal details
- Born: Bela Metcalfe Hughes; April 6, 1817 Carlisle, Kentucky, U.S.
- Died: October 3, 1902 (aged 85) Denver, Colorado, U.S.
- Party: Democratic

Bela Metcalfe Hughes (April 6, 1817 – October 3, 1902) was an American lawyer, businessman and politician. Hughes played an important role in connecting the American West to the rest of the country with stagecoach lines, as well as in the early legal development of Colorado.

== Early life and education ==
Bela Metcalfe Hughes was born on April 6, 1817, in Carlisle, Kentucky. This small town in Eastern Kentucky had been founded just one year before his birth, when John Kincart donated land to facilitate the relocation of the county seat from Ellisville, 5 miles (8.0 km) to the north. He was born to Rhoda Dent Hughes and her husband Andrew S. Hughes. Bela Hughes ancestry was Welsh on his paternal and English on his maternal side. His father Andrew S. Hughes was a lawyer and also served in the Kentucky Senate for many years.

Bela Hughes lived the first twelve years of his life in Carlisle, where he was educated in public schools. In 1829, Andrew S. Hughes moved his family to Liberty, Missouri, and opened law offices there and later also in Weston, Missouri. After finishing his school education, Bela Hughes moved back to his state of birth in order to attend Augusta College in Augusta, Kentucky. His studies were interrupted by his military service during the Black Hawk War, during which he served with the Missouri Volunteers. He graduated from Augusta College with a Bachelor of Arts. In 1838, after his graduation, Bela Hughes moved back to Missouri.

== Pioneer in the Midwest ==
=== Political career ===
Bela Hughes was elected to represent Platte County in the Missouri House of Representatives in the 1844 elections. He was elected to a two-year term and served as a Democratic member during the 13th General Assembly. The 13th General Assembly first convened in the City of Jefferson, Missouri on November 18, 1844. On January 28, 1845, two months into his term, he resigned in a letter to Governor John Cummins Edwards. The Missouri Legislature incorporated the Missouri Historical and Philosophical Society on February 27, 1845, with Bela Hughes as one of its inaugural members.

Hughes resigned his seat in the state legislature in order to take office as Receiver of Public Moneys at the United States Land Office at Plattsburg, Missouri. He had been appointed by President John Tyler in January 1845. Hughes replaced E. M. Samuel on March 4, 1845.

At the time, Receivers of Public Moneys were officers of the federal government that collected money across the United States. In 1845, a Receiver was compensated with base salary of $500 (equivalent to $17,277 in 2025) and a commission of one cent per Dollar accounted for. The commission could not exceed $2,500 (equivalent to $86,384 in 2025).

Hughes' term as receiver was supposed to end on January 13, 1849, and he was re-nominated in a letter to the United States Senate by President James K. Polk on January 3, 1849. Hughes' party, the Democrats, had just lost the 1848 United States presidential election to Whig nominee Zachary Taylor. The Democrats tried to re-install their officeholder in the Senate's lame duck period before Taylor would be sworn-in as president in March 1849. Hughes chose to resign instead stating that he "would not hold an office, which under the customs of parties, belonged to some Whig". His resignation was effective in May 1849.

=== Business career ===
==== Developer ====
In 1838, Bela Hughes bought swaths of land in Weston, Missouri, which had been founded just one year prior. He developed city streets and land plots and was successful in marketing the land to pioneers. Within one year the town's population grew to 300 and it became a significant transportation hub on the Missouri River. The town shipped more hemp than any other place in Missouri. In 1840, Hughes' cousin Ben Holladay joined him in Weston, where Holladay started his first businesses. Hughes and Holladay were important figures in Weston's early history and shaped the development of the town. Hughes sold his interest and left Weston in 1845, when he was appointed to office in Plattsburg.

In 1855, he was involved in a land development and banking firm in the Kansas Territory with Alexander William Doniphan, who was also a law graduate from Augusta College.

==== Attorney ====
In 1841, Bela Hughes was admitted to the Missouri Bar. After resigning as Receiver at Plattsburg in 1849, Hughes moved to St. Joseph, Missouri to practice law there. In St. Joseph, he formed the law firm Woodson & Hughes together with Silas Woodson, a fellow Kentucky-born lawyer involved in the local Democratic party, who was later in 1872 elected to serve as 21st Governor of Missouri.

Hughes and Woodson were alleged to be involved in electoral irregularities in the Kansas Territory at the beginning of the violent civil confrontations called Bleeding Kansas. In May 1854, the Kansas-Nebraska Act had organised the Kansas and Nebraska Territories in the lands west of the Mississippi River. Congressional proponents of the act had assumed that Kansas would permit slavery while Nebraska would prohibit it and therefore preserve the balance between slave and free states. Immediately, immigrants supporting both sides of the slavery question arrived in the Kansas Territory to establish residency and gain the right to vote. In November 1854, thousands of armed pro-slavery men known as "Border Ruffians", mostly from Missouri, poured into the Kansas Territory and swayed the vote in the election for a non-voting delegate to Congress in favour of pro-slavery Democratic candidate John Wilkins Whitfield.

On March 30, 1855, the Kansas Territory held the election for its first territorial legislature. Crucially, this legislature would decide whether the territory would allow slavery. Just as had happened in the election of November 1854, "Border Ruffians" from Missouri again streamed into the territory to vote, and pro-slavery delegates were elected to 37 of the 39 seats. Bela Hughes and Silas Woodson were both mentioned in multiple testimonies in front of the congressional committee investigating the elections as well-known public figures from Missouri who were present at the election at Burr Oak precinct in 14th district of the Kansas Territorial legislature. Hughes or Woodson were not witnessed actually participating in the illegitimate voting on that day. Hughes personal stance on slavery is unclear. Silas Woodson, on the other hand, was actually well known as an abolitionist. At the 1849 Kentucky Constitutional Convention, Woodson was the only member to introduce language for the gradual emancipation of the state's slaves. During the Civil War, both Hughes and Woodson were Unionists.

==== Overland Stage Line ====
On April 26, 1861, Bela Hughes was chosen as president and general counsel of the Central Overland California and Pikes Peak Express Company. He was at the time still a resident of St. Joseph, which was the eastern terminus of the company's Pony Express stagecoach line. In the years prior, the company had successfully operated the Pony Express as the fastest way to transmit information from east to west before the advent of the first transcontinental telegraph in October 1861.

With the beginning of the Civil War in 1861, the Butterfield Overland Mail line was destroyed by confederate forces in Texas, making the Overland line the only option for mail to California. Therefore, the Federal Government began to heavily subsidize the company. The volume of express mail continued to rise. However once the Pony Express stopped receiving government subsidies upon completion of the transcontinental telegraph, the business ran out of cash. Hughes was unaware of the company's financial problems when he accepted the offer to serve as its president. The company's contract expired in 1862. At that point Overland Mail put the contract up for bid and it was won by Bela Hughes' cousin Ben Holladay, who in prior years had loaned substantial amount to the company. On March 21, 1862, Holladay purchased the holdings of the C. O. C. & P. P. Express at public sale for $100,000 (equivalent to $3,225,000 in 2025) and incorporated it into his firm the Overland Stage Company. Hughes was then appointed general counsel of the Overland Stage Company.

Holladay sold his stage routes to Wells Fargo Express in 1866 for $1.5 million (equivalent to $32,982,955 in 2025) in cash and $300,000 (equivalent to $6,596,591 in 2025) worth of Wells Fargo stock. This also ended Bela Hughes involvement in stagecoach lines.

== Pioneer in Colorado ==
In 1861, Bela Hughes first came to Colorado in his capacity as president of the Overland stagecoach line. Hughes surveyed the Berthould and Boulder Pass for possible routes and in the following years he also made frequent trips to Denver, which was at the time an important town along the stagecoach line. In 1866, Hughes moved his family to Denver, which was in the 1860s still a rather small town. The 1860 census had counted a population of just 4,749.

=== Business career ===
==== Railways ====
===== Denver Pacific Railway =====
In 1862, Congress had passed the Transcontinental Railroad Act, which among other things, authorized Union Pacific Railroad to lay tracks westward from Omaha, Nebraska. In a major setback for Colorado, Union Pacific Chief Engineer Grenville M. Dodge recommended to build the Transcontinental Railroad further north through Wyoming. Julesburg was the only town in the territory included in the plan. In Colorado, reactions varied from disappointment to anger. Colorado territorial Governor John Evans declared that "Colorado without railroads is comparatively worthless."

In Denver, a town of around 5,000 people at the time, local merchants and businessmen were especially afraid of being left out of and decided to cooperate with the Kansas Pacific Railroad to assure a direct connection to the East of the country, while at the time building a branch line to the Transcontinental Railroad in Cheyenne. Denver's leading citizens, among them Governor John Evans, David Moffat, Walter Cheesman and Bela Hughes raised $300,000 (equivalent to $6,910,714 in 2025) capital in one week. On November 29, 1867, the Denver Pacific Railway and Telegraph Company was incorporated under the general laws of the Territory of Colorado. Bela Hughes was chosen as the president of the new company. A sense of urgency existed for this Denver based corporation, due to the formation of a rival, the Colorado, Clear Creek and Pacific Railway (later the Colorado Central), by W.A.H. Loveland and citizens of nearby Golden, with the intention of linking that city directly with Cheyenne and making Golden the natural hub of the territory.

On June 24, 1870, the very first train arrived in Denver carrying 40 passenger across the line from Cheyenne. It was greeted by thousands of spectators. Two months later, in August 1870, the Kansas Pacific completed its line to Denver and the first train arrived from Kansas. With the completion of the Kansas Pacific line to Denver, the Denver Pacific became integral to the first transcontinental rail link between the east and west coasts of America. The Denver Pacific's rival, the Colorado Central line from Golden, was not completed until 1877. By this time, Denver had established its supremacy over its rival as the population center and capital city of the newly admitted State of Colorado.

The new network of Kansas Pacific and Denver Pacific competed heavily with Union Pacific (UP), which had formed an agreement to ship goods of the Denver Pacific line beyond Cheyenne for a reduced rate. UP refused to apply these lower price for goods that had been handled by Kansas Pacific. In 1872, Bela Hughes resigned as president of Denver Pacific in an unsuccessful attempt to solve this conflict by merging operations with Kansas Pacific. In 1879, the dispute finally ended, when Union Pacific incorporated the network of both Denver and Kansas Pacific.

John Evans had laid out towns along the railway line that were around 40 miles apart from each other. These towns served as depots for construction and operations of the line. The first depot north of Denver was named Hughes station after Bela Hughes and thus the town was also called Hughes in the first years of its existence. It later changed its name to Brighton.

===== Denver, South Park & Pacific Railway =====
In 1872, former Governor John Evans decided to attempt to profit off freight traffic to Colorado's booming mining industry. Again the Denver business community joined him in his efforts. The Denver, South Park & Pacific Railway (DSP&P) was incorporated in September 1872 by Evans, David Moffat, Walter Cheesman, Leonard Eichholtz, Charles Kountze and Bela Hughes. Hughes served as general counsel of the new company.

The first sections of the track were laid in 1874 but due to bad management and worsening economic conditions the line reached its original target, the mining areas near Fairplay, Colorado, not before 1879. In 1880, the company's line was branched out towards Breckenridge and Leadville, which were more important mining areas at the time. Then in May 1880, the DSP&P was sold to Jay Gould of Union Pacific. This sale included the stock of Bela Hughes.

==== Attorney ====
Bela Hughes was an important attorney in the early days of Colorado, when he was mostly involved in criminal and corporate law. In November 1867, he defended Paul Coburn against the charge of murdering J. W. Hammar in Pueblo, Colorado. The defence also included Samuel E. Browne, a former U.S. Attorney in Colorado. Hughes and Browne were successful in their defence as Coburn was acquitted by the jury after one hour of deliberation.

In March 1871, Hughes was chosen as attorney for the Colorado branch of the Great Western Insurance Company. In 1872, he served as the president of the Denver Bar Association.

In 1884, Hughes successfully defended the City of Colorado Springs in U.S. District Court for the District of Colorado in the case of Ephraim Clark v. the City of Colorado Springs. He argued that the bonds the city had issued to build a school building were valueless because the school did not constitute a "town purpose" under the laws of 1868. The plaintiff, Ephraim Clark, had come into the possession of $2,000 (equivalent to $71,667 in 2025) of those bonds and had demanded payment.

=== Political career ===
Bela Hughes started to be involved in the Colorado Democratic Party immediately after he moved to Denver in 1866. On November 30, 1868, the Democratic Territorial Convention was set to discuss "The State Question" in order to decide whether the Democrats should endorse statehood for the Colorado Territory at the time. Hughes addressed the convention in a short note, that was published in the Rocky Mountain News on the same day:

It is my opinion that you would promote the interests of the people of Colorado by the advocacy of the State into the Union. (...) I have no right to speak for anyone else; I do not, nor do I presume to dictate any course to you, or anyone else. I simply say that I am for the admission of Colorado, and ever have been.

— Bela M. Hughes, Admission of Colorado, Rocky Mountain News (November 30, 1868)

The advocacy of Hughes and others was unsuccessful in 1868. At the time, the Democratic convention voted down a resolution endorsing statehood by an overwhelming margin.

In 1873, Bela Hughes was considered by the Rocky Mountain News as a worthy candidate for the office of Mayor of Denver. However, Hughes did not run for that office and Francis M. Case was elected instead. On July 24, 1874, Hughes was a candidate for non-voting Delegate to the United States House of Representatives on seventh and eighth ballot at the Democratic Territorial Convention in Colorado Springs. Hughes send a note to the Rocky Mountain News stating that the "use of his name before the Democratic convention, at Colorado Springs, was wholly unauthorized by him, and against his expressed wishes." Thomas M. Patterson won the Democratic nomination and was in November 1874 elected to serve as a Delegate in the 44th Congress (1875–76). Patterson defeated Republican Henry P. H. Bromwell by a vote of 9,255 to 7,170.

During the 1876 Democratic National Convention, Hughes was a member of the Democratic National Committee (DNC).

==== Territorial legislature ====
In 1875, Bela Hughes ran as a Democrat in 1st District (Arapahoe County) of the Territorial Council, the upper house of the Colorado Territorial Legislature. At the Democratic County Convention on 16 August, Hughes and W. M. Clayton were chosen as the Democratic nominees for the two seats in the 1st District. They won on the first ballot, by a vote of 56 for Hughes, 35 for Clayton, and 27 for incumbent Councillor R. G. Buckingham.

In the campaign, Hughes was attacked as an unpatriotic Democrat during the Civil War. The Rocky Mountain News defended him against this accusation and criticized the tone of the campaign. While explicitly not endorsing his candidacy, he News noted that Hughes had been a War Democrat, "in favor of all measures to preserve and restore the union."

In the 3 September election, Hughes won the most votes in the district with 1,905, while Republican former Mayor of Denver Baxter B. Stiles was second with 1,882. Hughes and Stiles were elected, while Democrat W. M. Clayton and Republican W. S. Decker were defeated.

The 11th Session of the Territorial Council first convened in Denver on 3 January 1876. The Democrats had an 8–4 majority (with one independent) in the Council and were choese the president of the chamber. The Colorado Transcript saw Hughes as a contender for that office, pointing out his eloquence, brightness, and "liberal sentiments". In the end, Adair Wilson was unanimously elected as President of the Council. Meanwhile, the Republicans held a four-seat majority in the House of Representatives, the lower house of the Colorado Territorial Legislature.

During the 11th Session of the Territorial Council, Hughes chaired the Council's Judiciary Committee. He introduced Council Bill 48 (CB 48) concerning the organization of the Supreme Court, and Council Bill 62 (CB 62) concerning secure liens to mechanics. CB 48 and CB 62 both passed the council by a 11–0 margin. In the House of Representatives, CB 48 was passed by a 16–4 margin and CB 62 passed by a 19–0 margin.

==== 1876 Colorado gubernatorial election ====
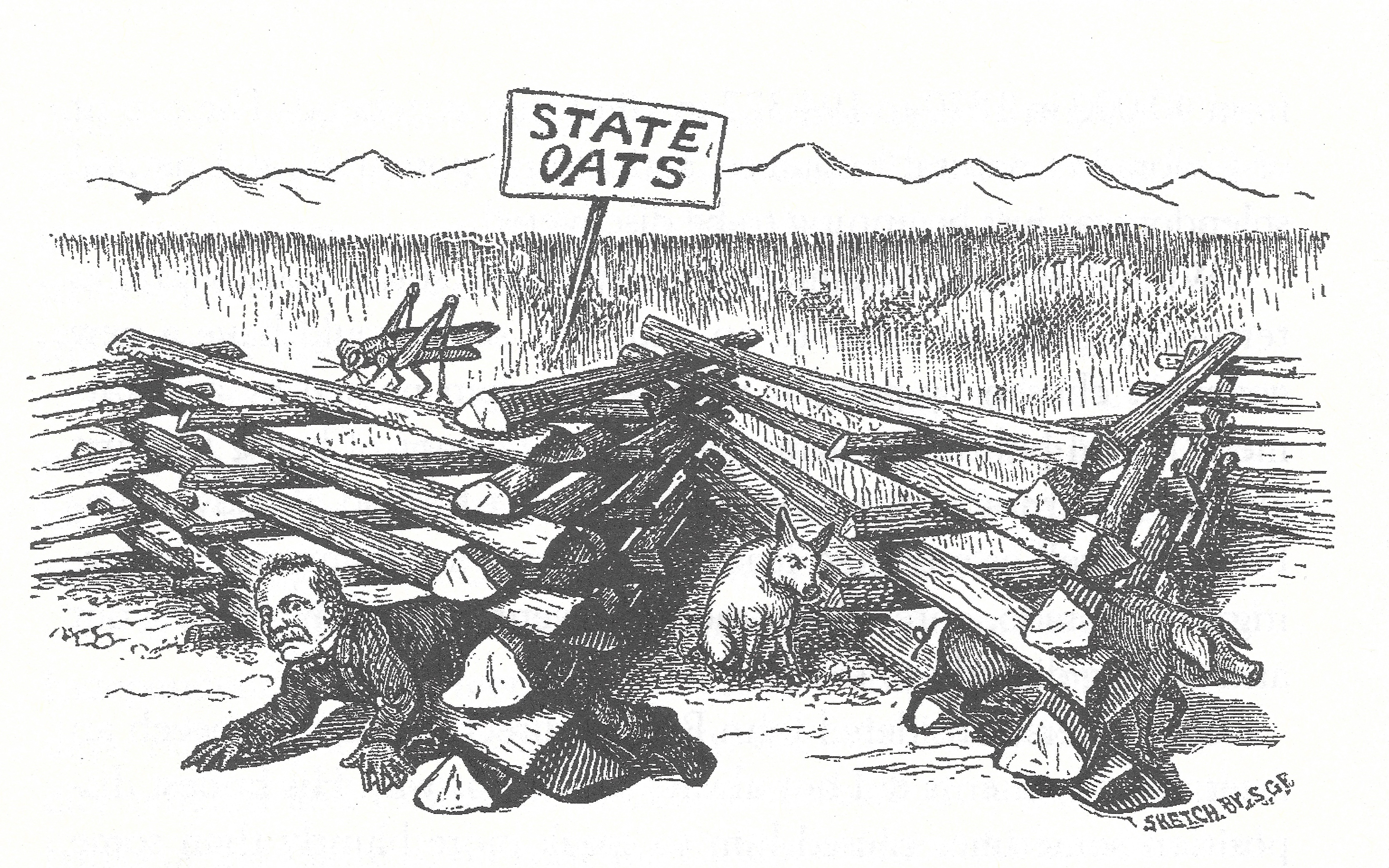
A political cartoon by the Denver Mirror, ridiculing territorial Governor John Routt.

In February 1876, Bela Hughes was already rumored in an article of the Colorado Weekly Chieftain to be the likely Democratic nominee in the first Gubernatorial election in the state of Colorado. On August 29, 1876, the Democratic convention met in Manitou Springs in order to nominate candidates for the first state elections on October 3, 1876. At the convention, Bela Hughes was nominated for the 1876 Colorado Gubernatorial election per acclamation.

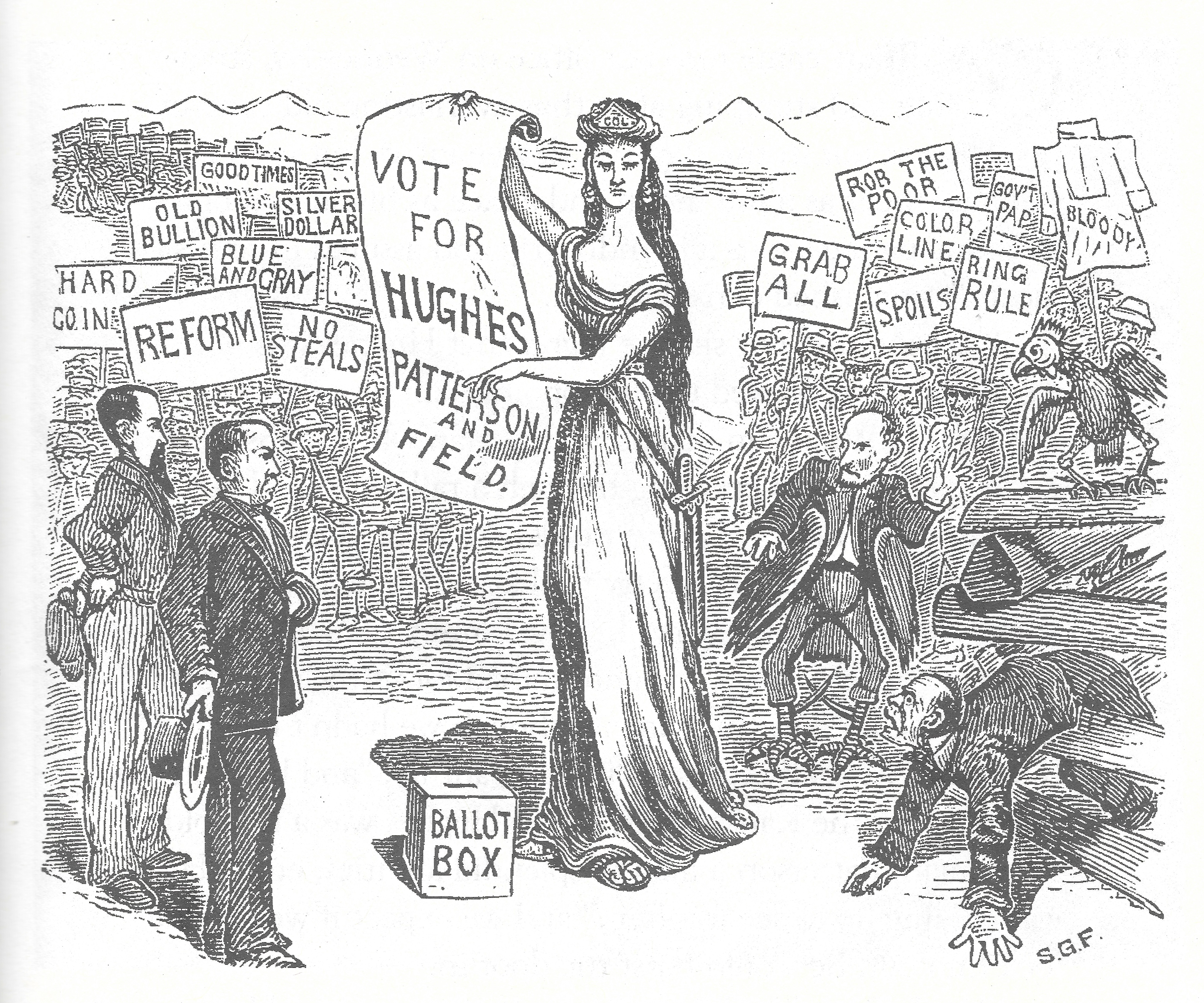
A political cartoon by the Denver Mirror, encouraging its readers to support Bela M. Hughes for Governor. Hughes is the second from the right, his opponent Gov. Routt is on the right between the fences.

During the campaign, Hughes hold many speeches presenting his platform. In the first three weeks of September 1876 alone, he travelled for campaign events to 15 different Colorado cities, speaking up to six nights per week. The Republican newspaper Golden Weekly Globe, published an extensive report on Hughes's speech in Golden. In their report, the newspaper alleged that Democratic presidential nominee Samuel J. Tilden had committed perjury and criticized Hughes for his defense and support of Tilden. The editorial also criticized Hughes' language, as he used phrases like "damned lie" and "the government is going to hell", despite the fact that there were around twenty women in the audience.

On the other hand, Democratic newspapers enthusiastically supported Hughes' candidacy. This was especially the case with the Denver Mirror, a small newspaper that was published by Stanley G. Fowler. Hughes' opponent, Territorial Governor John Routt, did not make any public speeches during the campaign. He preferred to meet and greet voters face-to-face. At one Republican event, Routt acknowledged that he was not using rhetorical skills like his opponent. He said: "I cannot soar as high as some of my friends on the other side, but I am short and spry, and when it comes to getting into the political pastures I can get in just as quickly as they by crawling through; perhaps I can beat them in, for they have to soar high to avoid the fences." The Denver Mirror then used the image of Routt crawling through the fences to paint him in multiple cartoons as a carpetbagger, who had not been elected but appointed to the territorial governorship by President Grant after serving in different political roles in Illinois and Washington, DC. The first cartoon was published on September 17, 1876. Fowler was successful with his cartoons, which were received attention across the whole state. Routt was amused by the caricatures and began to distribute copies of them at his campaign events. In its last cartoon concerning the 1876 State Elections on October 1, 1876, the Denver Mirror called its readers to support Hughes and other Democratic candidates, stressing their support for the Silver Dollar and political reforms, while alleging that a Republican state government would be tainted by corruption.

Nevertheless, Routt was able to secure another term in office as Republicans managed to sweep all statewide offices and both chambers of the Colorado General Assembly. Routt won the gubernatorial election by 14,154 to 13,316 votes and was sworn as the first Governor of the State of Colorado on November 3, 1876.

== Later life and recognition ==
After the lost gubernatorial election, Bela Hughes mostly retreated from politics. His advice was still sought but he never ran for public office again. In February 1877, he was suggested by the newspaper Memphis Appeal as United States Secretary of State, in case Democratic nominee Samuel J. Tilden would emerge as the winner of the contested 1876 presidential election. Hughes focused on his law practice in which he was in 1888 joined by his relative Charles J. Hughes Jr., who went on to represent Colorado as a Democratic member in the United States Senate. Bela Hughes retired from his profession as a lawyer in 1893.

On October 1, 1902, different Colorado newspaper reported that Bela Hughes was on his deathbed in his Denver home. He died on October 3, 1902, at around 4 am due to a pneumonia attack. He was interred at Fairmount Cemetery in Denver. In his obituaries, Bela Hughes was widely recognized as one of the most important figures in the early history of Colorado.

When the Colorado Capital Building was opened on November 9, 1894, Bela Hughes was included among the 16 individuals in the Colorado Hall of Fame with a stained-glass display in the dome of the new Capital Building. In October 1903, a bust of Bela Hughes was placed in the library of the Colorado Supreme Court commemorating his legacy. The bust was made in Florence based on pictures of Hughes.

== Personal life ==
Bela Hughes' first wife Catherina Neal died childless on September 6, 1844, after six years of marriage. In 1849, Hughes converted to Catholicism and remained a Catholic his whole life. He married his second wife, Laura Louisa Allen, on June 5, 1849. Laura Hughes gave birth to six children. She died in 1900.

His uncle Thomas Metcalfe was the 10th governor of Kentucky and also served in the United States House of Representatives for nine years and the United States Senate for one year.

Party political offices
Preceded by Office established	Democratic nominee for Governor of Colorado; 1876	Succeeded by William A. H. Loveland
