= William E. Beck =

American judge

Justice of the Colorado Supreme Court
- In office January 13, 1880 – January 8, 1889

Chief justice of the Colorado Supreme Court
- In office January 9, 1883 – January 8, 1889
- Preceded by: Samuel Hitt Elbert

Personal details
- Born: November 8, 1832 Venango County, Pennsylvania
- Died: September 2, 1892 (aged 59) Denver, Colorado
- Party: Republican
- Occupation: Justice and chief justice

William E. Beck (November 8, 1832 – September 2, 1892) was an attorney and a delegate for the framing of the state's constitution. He was then a district court judge and jurist and chief justice of the Colorado Supreme Court.

== Early life and education ==
Beck was born November 8, 1832 (Note: Beck was also said to have been born in New York about 1826 or born about 1837.) on a farm in Venango County, Pennsylvania. He was educated at district schools in Pennsylvania, two academies in Centre County, Pennsylvania, and then at the Classical and Commercial High School in Lawrenceville, New Jersey.

== Career ==
After he completed his education, he was a schoolteacher for several years and he studied the law. He moved to LaSalle County, Illinois and established himself in Mendota where he published the newspaper, The Observer, with J.C. Crocker. He worked as a surveyor and engineer. He studied the law with Crocker and was admitted to the bar in Illinois on November 6, 1861. He practiced law in Mendota and Ottawa, Illinois. He married before he moved west.

In the fall of 1872, he settled in Boulder, Colorado and practiced law there until 1876. He was elected by members of the Republican party to participate in the framing of the state's constitution in 1875. He and Byron L. Carr represented the 4th District. Beck was the chairman of the Committee on Ways and Means. He was a member of the committees on judiciary department, right of suffrage, elections, and miscellaneous division. The constitution was passed by the Congress of the United States and approved on March 3, 1875. Beck was a Republican.

Beck operated a law firm with George D. Reynolds named Beck & Reynolds until November 6, 1876, because Beck had accepted a seat on the bench of the First Judicial District. He became an associate justice of the Colorado Supreme Court January 13, 1880. (Note: He is also said to have become an associate judge in 1878, but there are many newspaper sources that report his 1879 election contest.) On January 9, 1883, he became the third Chief Justice of the Colorado Supreme Court, serving in this position until January 8, 1889. He was then appointed reporter of the decisions of the Supreme Court tribunal until his death.

Judge Beck, as the world estimates, was not a brilliant man, but while this is true, it is equally true that all the leading qualities of sterling manhood were in him so pronounced as to distinguish him unmistakably as no ordinary man.

— Samuel Hitt Elbert, former chief justice, Colorado reports, Supreme Court's official journal

== Death ==
Beck died at his home in Denver on September 2, 1892. He was about 60 years old at the time of his death. He is buried in Riverside Cemetery in Denver.

== Notes ==
Political offices
Preceded by Samuel Hitt Elbert	Chief Justice of the Colorado Supreme Court; 1883–1888	Succeeded by Joseph C. Helm
