= Alice Stewart Hill =

American painter

- Born: Alice Amelia Stewart c. 1851; Amboy, New York
- Died: January 10, 1896; Dansville, Livingston County, New York
- Education: School of Design of Cooper Union; National Academy of Design
- Occupations: Artist, art instructor, illustrator
- Known for: Creating works of art of Colorado flowers
- Spouse: Francis Burke Hill
- Parent(s): Sarah McFetridge Stewart (mother); George H. Stewart (father)
- Relatives: Justice Joseph Helm (brother-in-law)

Alice Stewart Hill (pen name, AAS, ASH; born Alice Amelia Stewart; c. 1851–January 10, 1896) was an American artist who created paintings and illustrations. Her specialty was creating works of art based upon the flowers of Colorado. Her work was of interest to noted botanist Asa Gray of Harvard College because Colorado has flowers that were different than their eastern varieties, as well as flowers that grow above the timberline on Pikes Peak.

== Early life ==
Alice Stewart was born about 1851 in Amboy, New York. (Note: She was also said to have been born in 1850 in Beaver Dam, Wisconsin.) Her parents were Sarah McFetridge, born in 1816 in Ireland, and George H. Stewart, born in Vermont in 1816. They lived in New York for the birth of their first three children: Helen, Harriet, and Alice. In 1852, the family moved to Beaver Dam, Wisconsin, where her father established a woolen mill and farms to raise crop seed. He also sold real estate. He helped establish a church, cemetery and bank. (Note: She is also said to have been raised in Beaver Creek, Pennsylvania; there is no town by that name in Pennsylvania, although there are several named creeks.) Her younger sister, Marcia Stewart, born in 1855, was the wife of Judge Joseph Church Helm. Older sister Helen died in 1860 at the age of 22.

Hill showed an interest in art at a young age and submitted her works at local Wisconsin venues, where she won prizes. She attended the School of Design of Cooper Union and from 1873 to 1874, the National Academy of Design in New York City.

External image
- The George H. Stewart House in Colorado Springs, with Alice A. Stewart holding the reins of her pony

Stewart and her family moved to Colorado Springs in 1874 for her father George H. Stewart's health; He had asthma. He sold real estate and crop seed. He became known as Judge Stewart when he became a justice of the peace. He was also the president of the First National Bank. He engaged in other business enterprises and civic- and religious-based efforts.

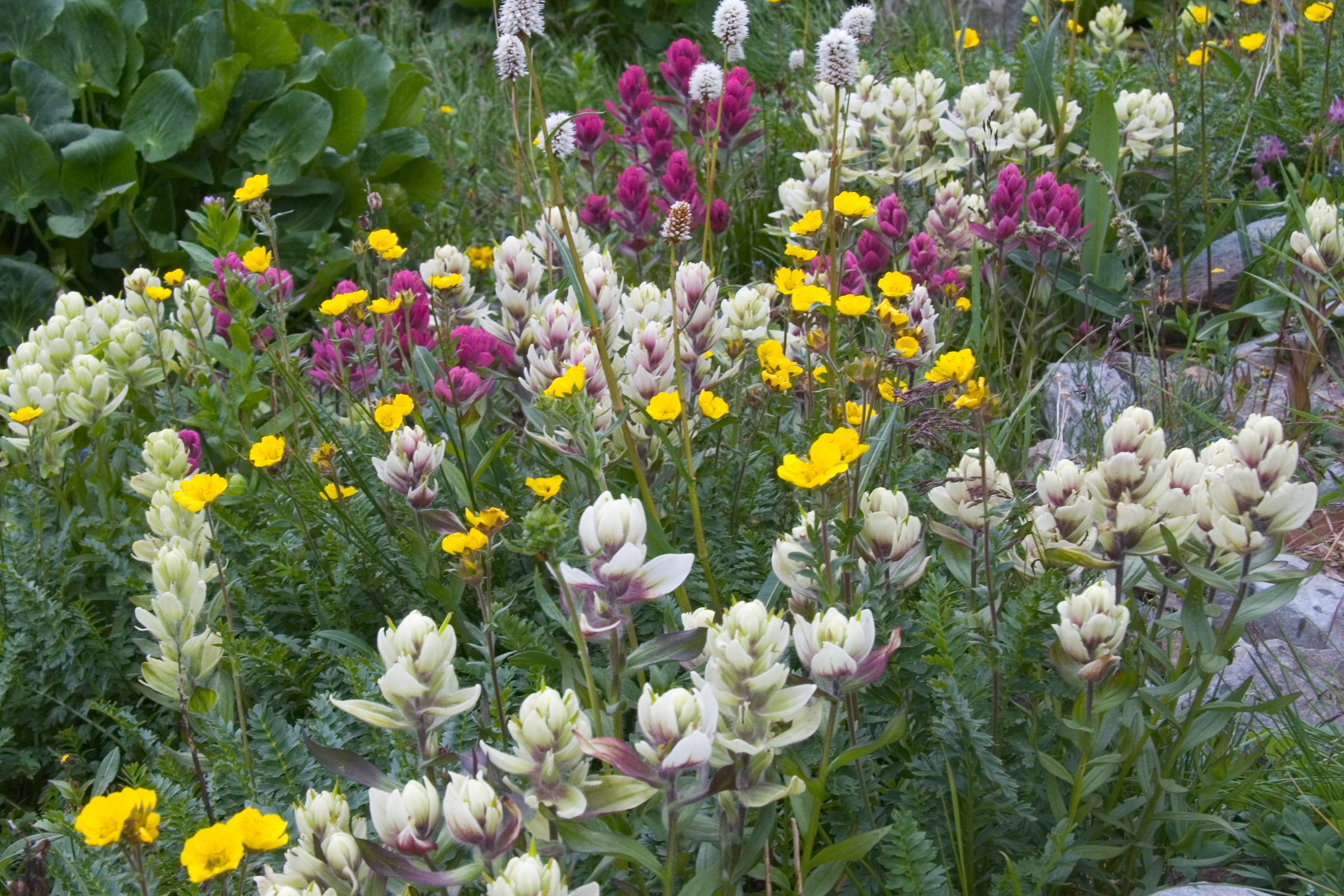
Colorado wildflowers

One of her past times during her early days in Colorado Springs was to ride her pony and gather wildflowers on the plains, canyons, and mountains of Colorado. She traveled locally up Pikes Peak and made longer treks to La Veta Pass, Sangre de Cristo Mountains, and Sierra Blanca to gather flower specimens. She went for further study in Chicago to focus on painting flowers. She also studied with Thomas Parrish, a local artist.

== Career ==
She was an artist and art instructor of Colorado Springs. She taught watercolor painting, oil painting, and drawing primarily in Colorado Springs and also in Denver from the time she arrived in Colorado. She had a studio full of her works—paintings of flowers, crayon landscapes, and a variety of works on paper and cedar—which she sold.

The quality of the painting makes these pictures desirable their great value comes from the fact that they are paintings of Colorado flowers. It is well known that the flora of the Rocky Mountains is distinct in genus and species from that east of the Mississippi.

— "Miss Stewart’s Painting of Flower", Weekly Gazette, October 12, 1878

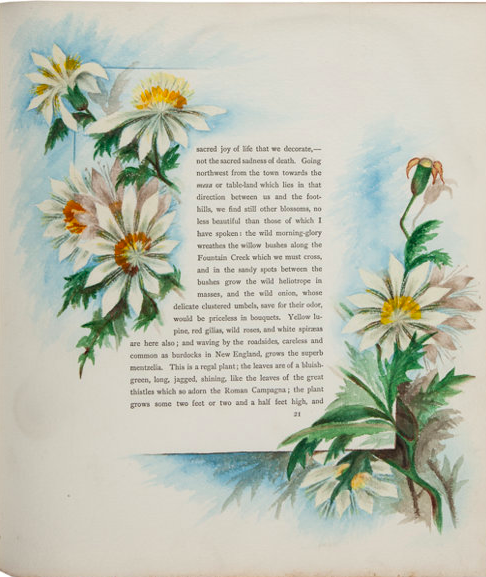
The Procession of Flowers, Helen Hunt Jackson, illustrated by Alice A. Stewart, 1886

External image
- Slideshow of The Procession of Flowers, Library of Congress

The country's leading botanist, Professor Asa Gray of Harvard College, placed a large order for her works of Colorado flowers. There were flowers that grew above the timberline on Pikes Peak. There were also flowers that were different than the varieties in the eastern part of the country, such as: the daisy, anemone, and harebell. With Susan Dunbar, she identified all the state's wildflowers. She had the largest collection of works of Colorado flowers in the country.

She illustrated for a number of authors from Colorado Springs, including Susan Teel Dunbar's story "Anemones" and other works. She illustrated works for Helen Hunt Jackson, including The Procession of Flowers in Colorado under the name Alice A. Stewart, and she specialized in watercolor paintings of Colorado wildflowers. She created illustrations for Susan Coolidge, the pen name for Sarah Chauncey Woolsey entitled Her Garden. It was written following the death of her friend, Helen Hunt Jackson, about her favorite flower-filled place on Cheyenne Mountain. Etchings were made by Parrish and Hill of her illustrations for the special edition book. M Virginia Donaghé's books A Colorado Wreath and Colorado Favorites were illustrated by her, under the name Alice A Stewart. Her etchings of wildflowers appear in a section entitled "Colorado Wild Flowers" in the book Extraordinary Women of the Rocky Mountain West. Hill collected 365 flower poems for an anthology The Day and the Flower which was published in 1895.

She painted a portrait of Irving Howbert, who was at that time the county clerk.

== Personal life ==
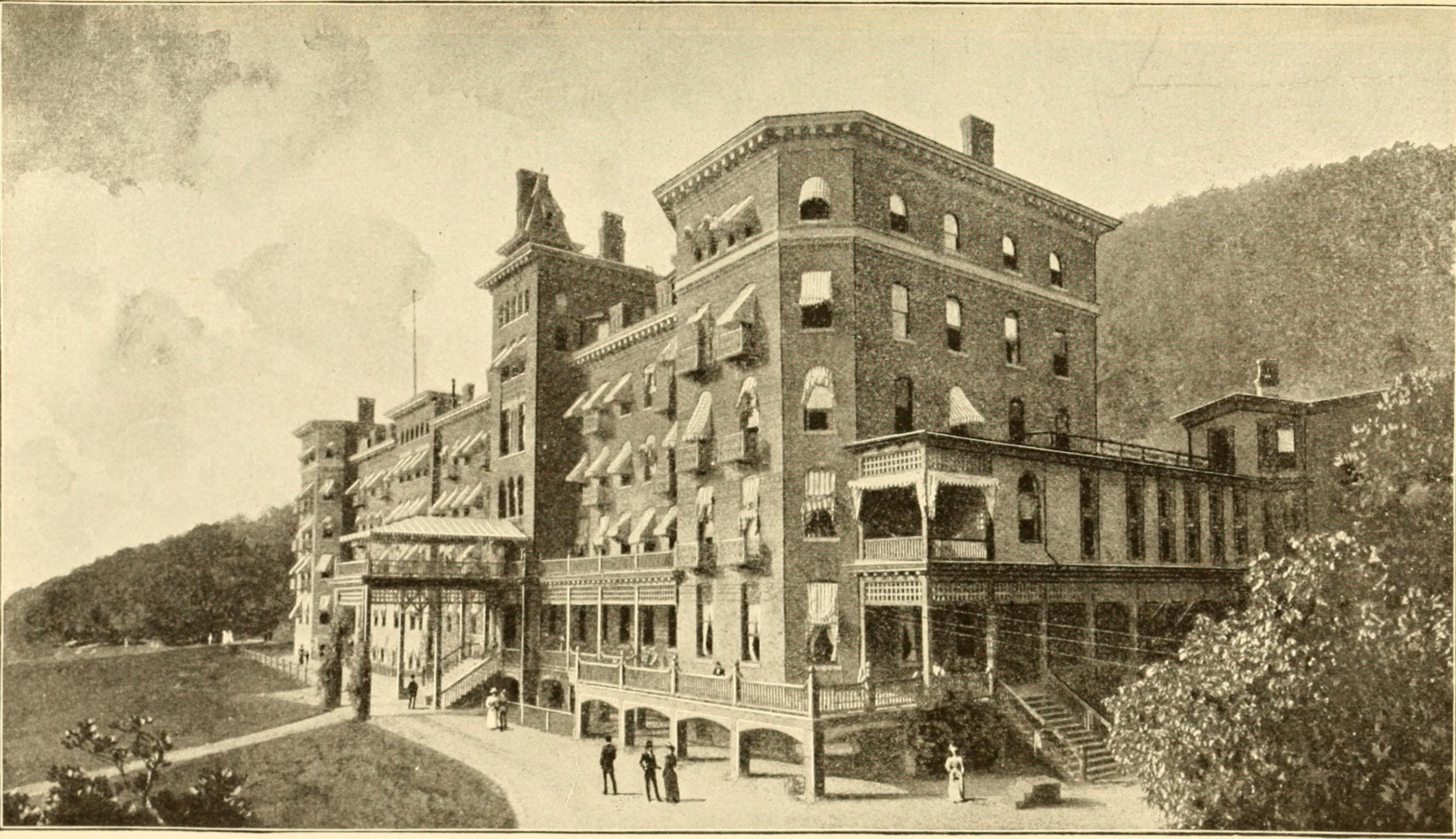
Sanitorium in Dansville, Livingston County, New York in 1897

On November 26, 1886, she was married to Francis Burke Hill. Born in Scotland, he was about 13 years her senior. He acquired his wealth through farming and diamond mining in South Africa. In Colorado, he dealt in real estate, mining, and partnered with his father-in-law and brother-in-law, Judge Joseph Helm. Her husband, who came to be referred to as Rev. Francis B. Hill, was a founder and major contributor to the All Souls Unitarian Church in Colorado Springs. The town of Falcon is established on what was part of his sheep ranch. They had no children.

After a prolonged illness, she died on January 10, 1896, in a sanitorium in Dansville, New York. Her husband died in California on September 9, 1911, and is buried at the Evergreen Cemetery in Colorado Springs.
