= 1894 Colorado gubernatorial election =

- November 6, 1894
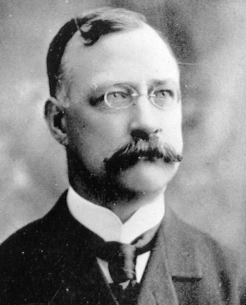

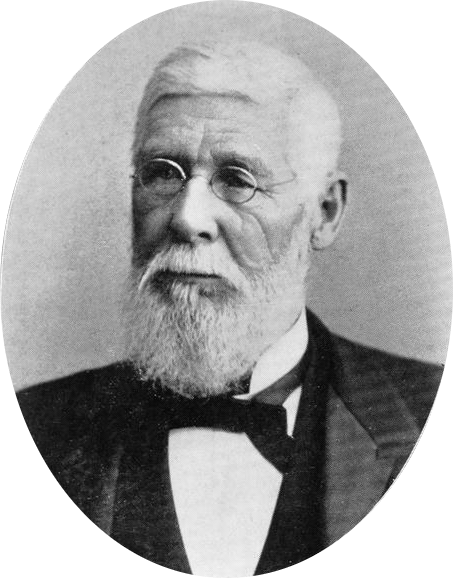

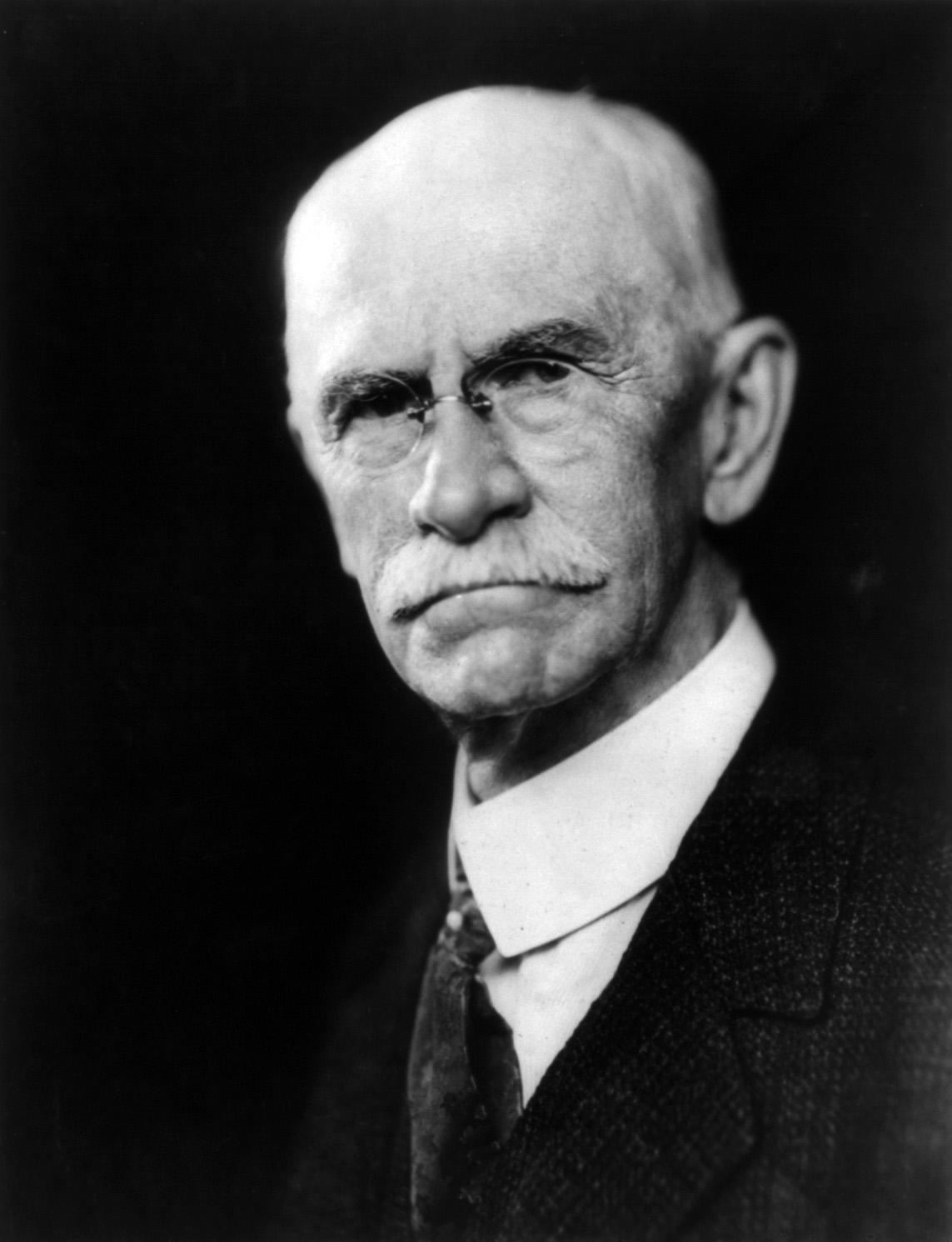
Nominee	Albert McIntire	Davis Hanson Waite	Charles S. Thomas
Party	Republican	Populist	Democratic
Popular vote	93,502	73,894	8,337
Percentage	51.95%	41.06%	4.63%
- County results McIntire: 40–50% 50–60% 60–70% 70–80% Waite: 40–50% 50–60% 60–70% 70–80%
Governor before election
Davis Hanson Waite
Populist
Elected Governor
Albert McIntire
Republican

The 1894 Colorado gubernatorial election was held on November 6, 1894. Republican nominee Albert McIntire defeated People's Party incumbent Davis Hanson Waite with 51.95% of the vote.

== General election ==
=== Candidates ===
Major party candidates

- Albert McIntire, Republican
- Charles S. Thomas, Democratic

Other candidates

- Davis Hanson Waite, People's
- George Richardson, Prohibition

=== Results ===
1894 Colorado gubernatorial election
Party	Candidate	Votes	%	±%
Republican	Albert McIntire	93,502	51.95%	+10.16%
Populist	Davis Hanson Waite (Incumbent)	73,894	41.06%	−5.62%
Democratic	Charles S. Thomas	8,337	4.63%	−5.00%
Prohibition	George Richardson	4,250	2.36%	+0.46%
Majority		19,608	10.89%	
Turnout		179,983		
Republican gain from Populist		Swing		

County	McIntire %	McIntire #	Waite %	Waite #	Thomas %	Thomas #	Richardson %	Richardson #	Total
Arapahoe	64.16%	34,583	31.60%	17,037	2.20%	1,191	2.01%	1,087	53,898
Archuleta	40.05%	143	46.21%	165	12.04%	43	1.68%	6	357
Baca	56.76%	193	8.23%	28	31.76%	108	3.23%	11	340
Bent	45.59%	326	41.67%	298	11.88%	85	0.83%	6	715
Boulder	43.98%	3,164	49.68%	3,574	2.41%	174	3.90%	281	7,193
Chaffee	46.11%	1,361	50.08%	1,478	2.33%	69	1.45%	43	2,951
Cheyenne	71.23%	156	24.20%	53	2.73%	6	1.82%	4	219
Clear Creek	32.77%	1,015	63.67%	1,972	1.16%	36	2.38%	74	3,097
Conejos	64.53%	1,856	33.62%	967	1.49%	43	0.34%	10	2,876
Costilla	58.43%	935	36.56%	585	4.50%	72	0.50%	8	1,600
Custer	51.60%	612	32.63%	387	14.92%	177	0.84%	10	1,186
Delta	43.21%	688	51.31%	817	1.75%	28	3.70%	59	1,592
Dolores	42.82%	388	52.75%	478	4.19%	38	0.22%	2	908
Douglas	65.62%	712	28.66%	311	4.60%	50	1.10%	12	1,085
Eagle	38.88%	490	58.17%	733	2.14%	27	0.79%	10	1,260
El Paso	57.53%	8,998	36.83%	5,761	2.94%	461	2.67%	418	15,638
Elbert	52.17%	408	31.71%	248	15.08%	118	1.02%	8	782
Fremont	47.41%	2,140	45.35%	2,047	2.52%	114	4.69%	212	4,513
Garfield	46.04%	1,111	48.94%	1,181	2.73%	66	2.27%	55	2,413
Gilpin	41.26%	1,177	54.73%	1,561	0.80%	23	3.19%	91	2,852
Grand	56.04%	153	38.09%	104	5.12%	14	0.73%	2	273
Gunnison	41.67%	894	51.00%	1,094	6.85%	147	0.46%	10	2,145
Hinsdale	37.90%	257	59.88%	406	1.50%	10	0.73%	5	678
Huerfano	51.61%	1,391	31.05%	837	16.77%	452	0.55%	15	2,695
Jefferson	50.69%	1,714	36.79%	1,244	5.53%	187	6.98%	236	3,381
Kiowa	57.22%	210	19.89%	73	22.07%	81	0.81%	3	367
Kit Carson	57.09%	374	31.75%	208	9.31%	61	1.83%	12	655
La Plata	39.28%	1,148	54.82%	1,602	5.23%	153	0.65%	19	2,922
Lake	46.97%	3,169	50.71%	3,421	1.92%	130	0.38%	26	6,746
Larimer	48.89%	1,942	38.54%	1,531	5.48%	218	7.07%	281	3,972
Las Animas	41.92%	2,812	30.88%	2,072	25.99%	1,744	1.20%	81	6,709
Lincoln	58.52%	182	20.57%	64	18.00%	56	1.16%	2	172
Logan	48.91%	474	40.35%	391	5.57%	54	5.15%	50	969
Mesa	41.52%	992	48.80%	1,166	2.97%	71	6.69%	160	2,389
Mineral	37.29%	427	58.86%	674	3.49%	40	0.34%	4	1,145
Montezuma	24.66%	203	66.22%	545	8.74%	72	0.36%	3	823
Montrose	38.81%	571	56.15%	826	1.97%	29	3.05%	45	1,471
Morgan	54.62%	419	39.24%	301	3.65%	28	2.47%	19	767
Otero	43.37%	975	39.67%	892	13.21%	297	3.73%	84	2,248
Ouray	25.96%	458	71.65%	1,264	2.04%	36	0.34%	6	1,764
Park	42.81%	658	53.35%	820	2.79%	43	1.04%	16	1,537
Phillips	52.99%	389	35.42%	260	5.17%	38	6.40%	47	734
Pitkin	29.81%	1,142	67.57%	2,588	2.01%	77	0.60%	23	3,830
Prowers	53.16%	361	35.49%	241	10.60%	72	0.73%	5	679
Pueblo	50.68%	4,881	40.35%	3,887	6.67%	643	2.28%	220	9,631
Rio Blanco	49.31%	215	35.77%	156	13.07%	57	1.83%	8	436
Rio Grande	47.08%	824	49.14%	860	2.51%	44	1.25%	22	1,750
Routt	51.03%	467	31.91%	292	16.50%	151	0.54%	5	915
Saguache	45.66%	658	50.38%	726	3.67%	53	0.27%	4	1,441
San Juan	19.69%	191	78.65%	763	1.64%	16	0.00%	0	970
San Miguel	40.24%	627	56.93%	887	1.73%	27	1.09%	17	1,558
Sedgwick	52.27%	207	36.61%	145	8.33%	33	2.77%	11	396
Summit	30.34%	373	65.25%	802	1.38%	17	3.01%	37	1,229
Washington	61.12%	379	24.83%	154	7.09%	44	6.93%	43	620
Weld	46.69%	2,584	45.41%	2,513	2.67%	148	5.22%	289	5,534
Yuma	40.09%	322	50.31%	404	6.84%	55	2.73%	22	803

Counties that flipped from Republican to Populist

- Archuleta
- Garfield
- Mesa
- Rio Grande

Counties that flipped from Populist to Republican

- Bent
- Fremont
- Larimer
- Otero
- Rio Blanco
- Sedgwick
- Weld

Counties that flipped from Democratic to Republican

- Las Animas
