= Charles Hayt =

American judge (1850–1927)

Charles D. Hayt
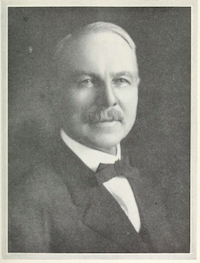

Justice of the Colorado Supreme Court
- In office 1889–1898

Chief justice of the Colorado Supreme Court
- In office 1892–1898

Personal details
- Born: May 20, 1850 Allegheny County, Pennsylvania
- Died: January 8, 1927 (aged 76) Denver, Colorado
- Resting place: Fairmount Cemetery, Denver, Colorado
- Spouse: Julia A. Palmer Hayt
- Education: Williston Seminary
- Occupation: Attorney, justice and chief justice
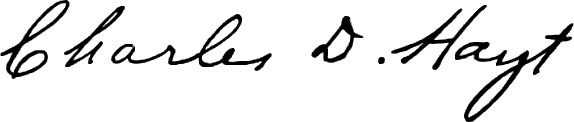
- Signature

Charles Denison Hayt (May 20, 1850 – January 8, 1927) was an attorney, district attorney, and jurist from Colorado. He served on the Colorado Supreme Court for nine years, including six years as chief justice. He practiced law and was a regional judge before and after he sat on the Supreme Court. He was the president of the Children's Home Society. He lectured on taxation at the University of Colorado from 1900 to 1908.

He and his wife had three children, all of whom died by the end of 1917. He was a member of a number of organizations.

== Early life and education ==
Born in Poughkeepsie, New York, on May 20, 1850, his parents were Jane (Berry) and Henry Delevan Hayt, who was a farmer that also freighted goods on the Hudson River. He graduated from the State Street High School at Albany, New York, in 1864. He studied at the Williston Seminary in Easthampton, Massachusetts, where he graduated with honors in 1867. (Note: The History of Colorado by the State Historical and Natural History Society of Colorado state that he graduated from State Street High School in 1867 and from Williston Seminary in 1869.) He ran his father's farm until 1871, and he began to study law in Poughkeepsie in 1870. Hayt first visited Colorado in 1870 or 1871. He was admitted to the bar in 1872.

== Career ==
In 1872, he was in Uniontown, Pennsylvania, where he worked for Uniontown Spoke Company. He became its appointed receiver in 1873. He moved to Colorado permanently in 1874, settling in Walsenburg of Huerfano County, where he became a partner with Judge John F. Read of Read & Hayt. He engaged in realty and the law, while he continued to study the law. The governor appointed Hayt that year to the board of county commissioners of Huerfano county. In the fall of 1874, he became the probate judge for the county.

From 1876 to 1877, Hayt served as a county judge in Huerfano County. La Veta was the terminus then for the Denver & Rio Grande Railroad. He opened an office there in 1876. When the railroad line was extended into Costilla County, Colorado, to Garland City, he moved there and became postmaster. In 1878, he was admitted to the bar in Colorado in 1878. He moved to Alamosa, where he practiced law and served as the town's first postmaster from 1878 to 1881. In March 1881, he became the district attorney of the then newly formed 6th Judicial District, serving until 1883. While district attorney of Conejos County, Colorado, he successfully prosecuted the case of a notorious stagecoach robbery in 1881.

He became the judge of the 6th Judicial District and served in the position from 1883 to 1889. In 1888, he was elected to the Colorado Supreme Court and began serving as an associate justice in 1889. He became Chief Justice in January 1892 and served for six years until he was voted out of office. While he served the Supreme Court, he rendered more than 1,800 decisions. One decision was about whether there should be a limit to municipal, county, or state public indebtedness. Another decision saved the state from bankruptcy by preventing the issuance of $750,000 warrants previously authorized by an act of the legislature.

His term ended in January 1898, whereupon he returned to private law practice. He was the senior partner of Hayt, Dawson & Wright. He had an office at the First National Bank Building and the Ernest & Cramner building. From 1893 to 1898, he was the president of the Children's Home Society. He lectured on taxation at the University of Colorado from 1900 to 1908.

== Personal life ==
On October 3, 1878, he married Julia Aline Palmer at La Veta. Julia, born at Spring Place, Georgia, was the daughter of Ella Patterson Palmer and Andrew Jackson Palmer. She held musicales at her home in which she sang. They had three children:

- Ella Palmer Hayt was married on September 16, 1916, to Paul Fanning, a mechanical and mining engineer. The couple died on February 27, 1917, as the result of a railway accident.
- Henry C. Hayt died in December 1889.
- Charles D. Hayt, Jr., who was an attorney in Alamosa, Colorado. He married Edith Freeman in 1911 and died in September 1917.

Hayt was a member of the Elks, the Masonic Temple, and the Sons of the American Revolution. He was also a member of the Denver Club and an honorary member of the Philosophical Society of Denver. He died in Denver on January 8, 1927 and is buried in Denver's Fairmount Cemetery.

== Notes ==
Political offices
Preceded by Joseph Helm	Chief Justice of the Colorado Supreme Court; 1892–1898	Succeeded by
