= Albert McIntire =

American politician (1853–1935)

Albert Wills McIntire
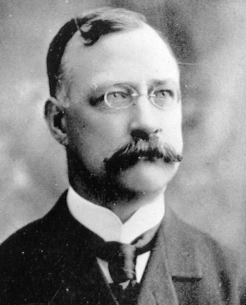

9th Governor of Colorado
- In office January 8, 1895 – January 12, 1897
- Lieutenant: Jared L. Brush
- Preceded by: Davis H. Waite
- Succeeded by: Alva Adams

Personal details
- Born: January 15, 1853 Pittsburgh, Pennsylvania, US
- Died: January 31, 1935 (aged 82) Colorado Springs, Colorado, US
- Party: Republican

Albert Wills McIntire (January 15, 1853 – January 31, 1935) was an American Republican politician. He was the ninth governor of Colorado from 1895 to 1897. In 1896 Governor McIntire sent the Colorado National Guard to Leadville due to violence at the Coronado Mine during a strike by the Western Federation of Miners.

Early in 1896, McIntire rejected a last-minute insanity defense appeal of the Park County rancher Benjamin Ratcliff, who murdered three members of his local school board with whom he had quarreled over the education of this three children. After McIntire refused to intervene, Ratcliff was hanged at the Colorado State Penitentiary at Cañon City. He claimed that he had committed the murders to uphold the honorable reputation of his family.

Party political offices
Preceded by Joseph Helm	Republican nominee for Governor of Colorado; 1894	Succeeded by G. H. Allen
Political offices
Preceded by Davis Hanson Waite	Governor of Colorado; 1895–1897	Succeeded by Alva Adams
