= Virginia Donaghe McClurg =

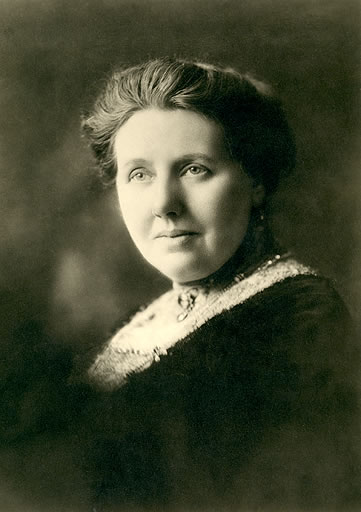
Virginia Donaghe McClurg, Colorado Springs Pioneers Museum

Mary Virginia Donaghe McClurg (1857 – April 29, 1931) was Regent-General of National Colorado Cliff Dwellings Association, one of the first white women to view the prehistoric cliff dwellings near Mesa Verde. The Mesa Verde National Park has been called the "Women's Park" because its creation was due almost solely to the work of two women, Virginia Donaghe McClurg and Lucy Peabody.

== Early life ==
Mary Virginia Donaghe McClurg was born in 1857 in Virginia, the daughter of Dr. William Rice Donaghe (1830-1866), physician and surgeon in charge of an hospital for Union soldiers at Shiloh, and Susan Boylston Hardin Richardson (1832-1913). Among her ancestors there are the founders of Harvard and Yale Universities and the founder of the town of Hartford, Connecticut. She was related to John Eliot, whose translation of the Bible was one of the first books published in America, and to Thomas Stanton, Indian interpreter for the colonies.

She attended an academy in Staunton, Virginia.

== Career ==
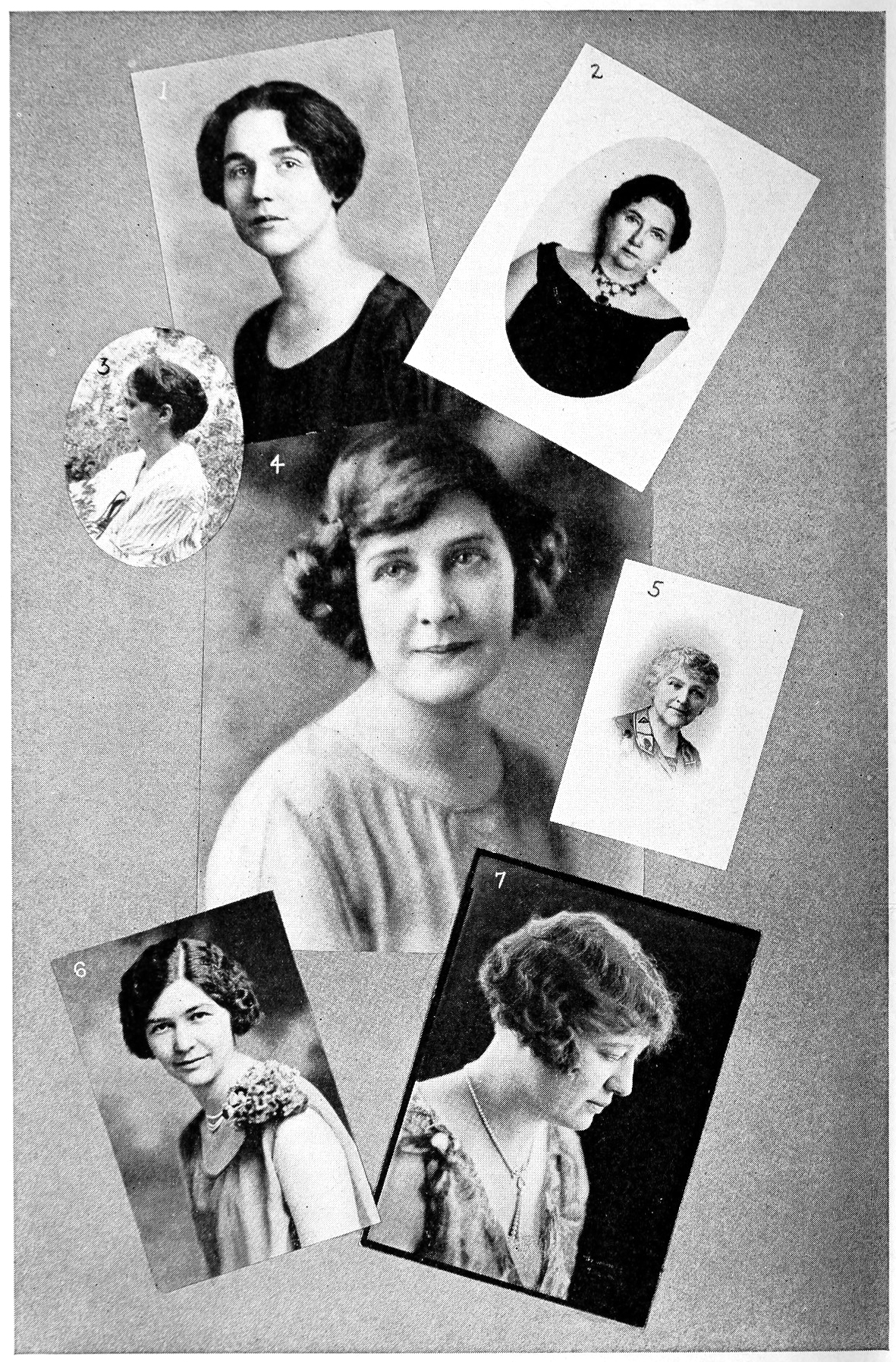
1) Margaret Tod Ritter, 2) Virginia D. McClurg, 3) Christine Whiting Parmenter, 4) Lillian White Spencer, 5) Nona L. Brooks, 6) Agnes Wright Spring, 7) Millicent H. Velhagen

She was a writer and lecturer. She made four transcontinental Lecture tours. She moved to Colorado Springs in 1877 as correspondent for the New York Daily Graphic. In 1882 she was one of the first white women to view the prehistoric cliff dwellings near Mesa Verde. She was internationally known for her exploratory and research work among the Colorado Cliff Dwellings and founded the Colorado Cliff Dwellings Association with the support of 5,000 member Colorado State Federation of Women's Clubs. The Association was instrumental in creating the Mesa Verde National Park. She was U. S. Delegate to the Ethnological Congress of the Paris Exposition in 1901. After her lecture before the College de France and the Trocadero Museum in Paris, the French Government decorated her with the title of Officier de Instruction Publique of France and awarded her the Gold Palm of the French Academy.

She took some classes at Colorado College (which, 1928, awarded her an honorary degree of Doctor of Letters) and in 1879 opened a select school for young women in Colorado Springs.

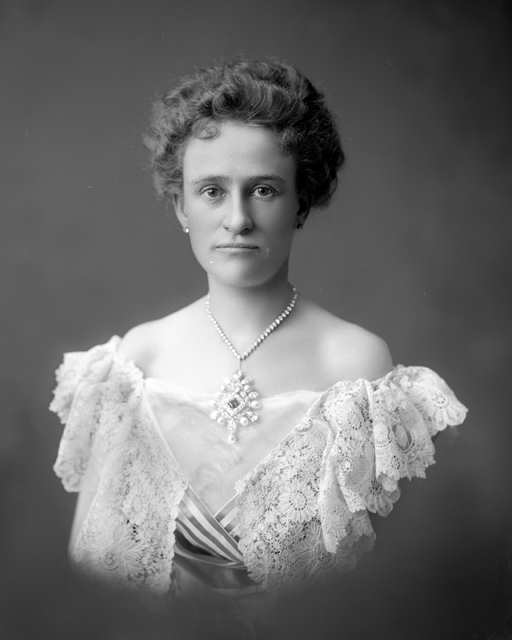
Virginia Donaghe McClurg

She was the author of "Picturesque Colorado" (1886), "Picturesque Utah" (1888), "Seven Sonnets of Sculpture", "Colorado favorites" (1882), "A Colorado wreath" (1899), and more. She wrote an History of El Paso County. Her husband published, after her death, The Poems of Virginia Donaghe McClurg.

She was awarded the national prize offered by the National Irrigation Congress for the best "Ode to Irrigation." It was set to music in 1903 and sung by the Salt Lake Tabernacle Choir at the Madison Square Garden.

She was on the permanent Pioneer Commission of the State of Colorado.

In 1893 she gave two lectures at the Woman's Building at the World's Columbian Exposition in Chicago and another at the International Woman's Reception hosted by Susan B. Anthony and Mary Wright Sewall.

Since 1895 she was Regent-General of National Colorado Cliff Dwellings Association.

She was an honorary member of the Clio Club of Denver and a corresponding member of the Chicago Historical Society. She was an honorary member of the Brooklyn Institute of Arts and Sciences.

She was president of the Anne Hathaway Shakespeare Club of Colorado Springs.

She was a member of the Society of Mayflower Descendants, Daughters of the American Revolution, Society of Descendants of Colonial Governors, Travel Club, Mary Ardin Shakespeare Club of New York City, International Shakespeare Birthday Society and several organizations.

== Personal life ==
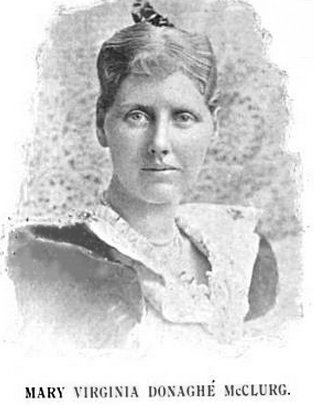
Virginia Donaghe McClurg

Virginia Donaghe McClurg lived in Morristown, New Jersey, and moved to Colorado Springs, Colorado, in 1877. In 1889 she married Gilbert McClurg (1858-1938), renowned lecturer, writer and publicist, grandson of Wisconsin Pioneer and founder of Racine, Wisconsin, Gilbert Knapp. They had one son, Dudley Boylston McClurg (1890-1952). She had a summer home at Custom House, Stonington, Connecticut and a winter home at 619 North Cascade Ave., Colorado Springs, Colorado.

She died on April 29, 1931, in Stonington, Connecticut, and is buried at Wequetequock Burial Ground, Stonington, Connecticut.
