= Lafayette Head =

American politician

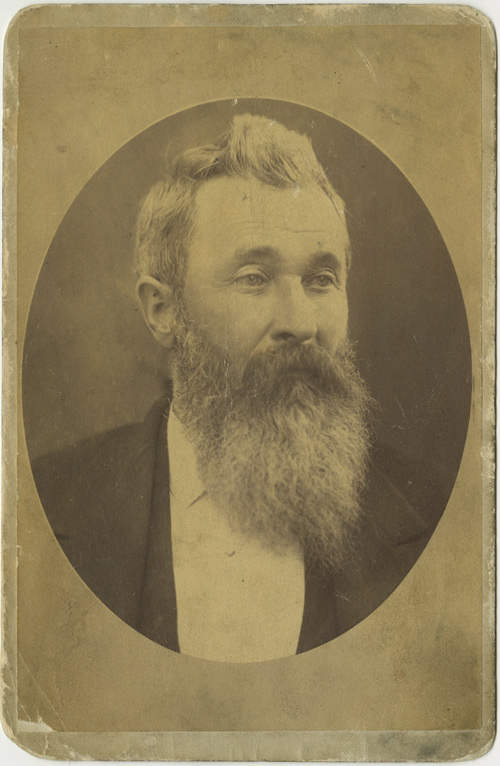
- Photo of Lafayette Head

1st Lieutenant Governor of Colorado
- In office November 3, 1876 – January 14, 1879
- Governor: John Long Routt
- Preceded by: Office established
- Succeeded by: Horace Tabor

Personal details
- Born: April 9, 1825 Head's Fort, Missouri, U.S.
- Died: March 8, 1897 (aged 71) Denver, Colorado, U.S.
- Party: Republican

Lafayette Head (April 9, 1825 – March 8, 1897) was the first Lieutenant Governor of Colorado, serving from 1876 to 1879 under Governor John Long Routt.

== Early life and family ==
Lafayette Head was born at Head's Fort, Howard County, Missouri. His grandfather, William Head, was a Revolutionary War veteran and a pioneer settler of central Missouri, arriving about 1811. Lafayette's parents, Alfred R. Head and Margaret Heard, also had daughters Eliza Jane (born 1821; married Nathan Hall Downing) and Barthena (born 1827; married John Thomas Gray). Alfred Head died in 1830. In 1841 Margaret Head married John Arnold, widower of one of Alfred Head's sisters. The following year they had a son, Jesse Arnold.

Head was also a holder of Native American child slaves. He failed to disclose the enslaved children in an initial report he wrote on Native American slaves in Colorado. He subsequently included them in his second report on the subject.

== New Mexico Settler ==
Head enlisted as a Private, Second Regiment, Missouri Volunteers and saw battle at La Canada, Embudo Pass, Taos and Santa Clara Springs during the Mexican–American War (1846-1848). He rose to the rank of Major. After the war he settled at Abiquiú, New Mexico Territory as a merchant. About 1851 he married Maria Juanita Martinez. Head served three years as U.S. Marshall for the northern district of New Mexico Territory and a term as Sheriff of Rio Arriba County.

In 1854 Head moved into the lower part of the San Luis Valley with fifty Mexican families who formed the village of Guadalupe along the Conejos River. He established a large sheep ranch nearby. He was a pioneer in irrigation and built one of the earliest flour mills in Colorado.

Head's nephew, Finis Downing, described the Head home at Conejos as it looked in 1863 – "It was a town of 'dobe houses. Uncle's was the largest and best, built like a fort around a square plat of 200 feet, with solid walls outside, windows and doors all inside the square. A lookout was two stories up."

Head was commissioned a Lieutenant in Colonel St. Vrain's regiment of volunteers in 1855 and served six months fighting the Utes and Apaches. In 1856 he was elected to the New Mexico Territorial Legislature representing Taos. He was chosen to fill a vacancy on the council and served as president in 1857.

About 1859 two Catholic priests, Father Machebeuf (later the first Bishop of Denver) and Father Ussell, traveled from Santa Fe to visit the little town of Guadalupe. On arrival they were met by Lafayette Head and Don Jesus Velasques, "the principal men of this miniature commonwealth." In his account of the trip, Father Ussell noted that Head was a convert to Catholicism, had been baptized by Bishop Lamy, and married a Mexican lady from a very good family. Ussell described the houses of Head and Velasquez as having only two rooms each - a kitchen and a large hall. Head's home served as a temporary church for two days while Fathers Machebeuf and Ussell heard hundreds of confessions and offered communion. Guadalupe sat in lowland along the river and was subject to flooding. The residents had selected a better site on high ground between the Conejos River and San Antonio Creek and laid out plans for a new town called Conejos. During the visit Father Machebeuf selected a site for a church in the new town.

== Indian Agent ==
In 1859 Head was appointed Special Agent for the Ute and Jicarilla Apache Indians. He continued as an Indian Agent for nine years, primarily with the Utes, using his home at Conejos as the agency headquarters. Head spoke Spanish but not the Ute language. On the recommendation of Kit Carson, he hired a Ute named Ouray as his interpreter. Ouray spoke fluent Spanish, some English, Apache and Ute.

Head accompanied the 1863 Ute delegation to Washington, DC to discuss a treaty. While there, the delegation met with President Lincoln, who made his traditional presentation of a silver tipped cane to Ouray, the delegation leader. In October of that year Head served as a member of the Commission appointed to finalize the treaty with the Utes. A handful of government representatives, accompanied by a military contingent, met at Head's ranch with 1,500 Utes. Head signed the October 7, 1863 "Treaty with the Utah - Tabeguache Band" as U.S. Indian Agent and Commissioner. Also present to sign the agreement was John Evans, Governor of Colorado Territory. John G. Nicolay, President Lincoln's Private Secretary and Secretary to the Commission, signed as a witness along with John M. Chivington, Colonel First Volunteer Cavalry of Colorado, Commanding District (who later led the Sand Creek Massacre), and Lieutenant Colonel Samuel F. Tappan, First Volunteer Cavalry of Colorado then commanding Fort Garland, Colorado Territory.

In 1868, Head returned to Washington, DC with another Ute delegation and signed the March 2, 1868 treaty as a witness, listing himself as U. S. Indian Agent. Signing as Commissioners for the United States were A. C. Hunt, Governor of Colorado Territory, and Kit Carson.

== Colorado legislator ==
When Colorado Territory was formed in 1861 out of parts of the territories of New Mexico, Utah, Nebraska, and Kansas, Head's ranch became part of Colorado. In 1872, he was elected to the Colorado Territorial Legislature from Conejos. He was one of 39 delegates, and one of the four Spanish speakers, elected to the 1875 constitutional convention in preparation for statehood. Head drafted significant portions of the Colorado constitution related to agriculture and irrigation.

Colorado became the Centennial State on August 1, 1876. Head was chosen Colorado's first lieutenant governor in the October 3, 1876 general election. He received 14,191 votes to 13,003 for his opponent, Michael Beshor. As Lieutenant Governor, Head was the presiding officer of the Colorado Senate, which included 26 elected senators.

Head was elected one of six Colorado delegates to the 1880 Republican National Convention which met in Chicago and nominated James A. Garfield and Chester A. Arthur as candidates for President and Vice President. He died in Denver on March 8, 1897.

Political offices
Preceded by Office created	Lieutenant Governor of Colorado; 1876–1879	Succeeded by Horace Austin Warner Tabor
