= Davis Hanson Waite =

American politician (1825–1901)

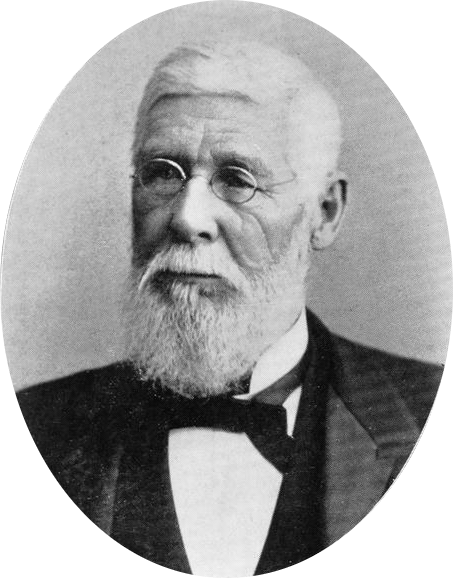

8th Governor of Colorado
- In office January 10, 1893 – January 8, 1895
- Lieutenant: David Hopkinson Nichols
- Preceded by: John L. Routt
- Succeeded by: Albert McIntire

Personal details
- Born: April 9, 1825 Jamestown, New York, US
- Died: November 27, 1901 (aged 76) Aspen, Colorado, US
- Party: Populist

Davis Hanson Waite (April 9, 1825 – November 27, 1901) was an American politician. He was a member of the Populist Party, and he served as the eighth governor of Colorado from 1893 to 1895.

== Biography ==
=== Early years ===
Davis Hanson Waite was born on April 9, 1825, in Jamestown, New York, to Joseph Waite and Olive Davis Waite. He studied law and graduated from Jamestown Academy. In 1851, he married Frances Eliza Russell and together they had three children, Arthur, Olive and May Josephine. Waite served in the state legislatures of Wisconsin in 1857, and Kansas in 1879.

Waite moved with his family to Leadville, Colorado, in 1879 to practice law. After his wife Frances died in November 1880, he moved to Aspen. In Aspen, he operated The Aspen Times for less than a year, and served as secretary of the local assembly of the Knights of Labor. He remarried to Celia O. Maltby (née Crane) on January 8, 1885. They had one son, Frank Hanson Waite.

=== Political career ===
Waite was elected to the Wisconsin Legislature as a Republican and ran a Republican newspaper in New York. In Colorado he edited the Union Era, a reform paper, and helped to organized the People's Party (Populists) national convention. In 1892 he was nominated as the Populist candidate for Governor of Colorado and he was inaugurated on January 10, 1893. A passionate supporter of the Populist's Omaha Platform, he was nicknamed "Bloody Bridles" for an 1893 speech, in which he proclaimed, "It is better, infinitely better that blood should flow to the horses' bridles rather than our national liberties should be destroyed."

His election coincided with the Panic of 1893 which hit the silver mining industry in Colorado particularly hard. In 1894, the Western Federation of Miners went on a five-month strike and Waite intervened on behalf of the union, ordering the deployment of the state militia to support and protect the miners. That same year Waite supported the American Railroad Union during the national Pullman Strike. As governor he was also instrumental in the passage of women's suffrage in Colorado, the second state to do so.

=== 1894 Denver "City Hall War" ===
In 1893, a new municipal charter was given to Denver by the state legislature that decentralized much of the mayor's powers into six different administrative departments, two of which were elected, two appointed by the mayor, and the remaining two appointed by the governor. The municipal board members appointed by the governor had complete financial control over the police, fire, and excise departments.

Governor Waite tried to overturn the corruption in Denver in 1894 by removing police and fire commissioners that he thought were shielding gamblers and prostitutes. The officials refused to leave their positions and were quickly joined by others who felt their jobs were threatened. They barricaded themselves in City Hall, and the state militia were sent to remove them. Federal troops were called in from nearby Fort Logan to intervene and quell the civil strife. Eventually Governor Waite agreed to withdraw the militia and allow the state Supreme Court to decide the case. The court ruled that the governor had authority to replace the commissioners, but he was reprimanded for bringing in the militia, in what became known as the "City Hall War".

He was defeated for reelection in 1894, but continued to be active in the Populist movement until his death in 1901.

=== Death and legacy ===
Waite died on November 27, 1901, while preparing Thanksgiving dinner at his home in Aspen. His house on West Francis Street in Aspen has been listed on the National Register of Historic Places.

== Footnotes ==
Party political offices
First	Populist nominee for Governor of Colorado; 1892, 1894	Succeeded by Morton Shelley Bailey
Political offices
Preceded by John Long Routt	Governor of Colorado; 1893–1895	Succeeded by Albert McIntire
