= John Long Routt =

American politician (1826–1907)

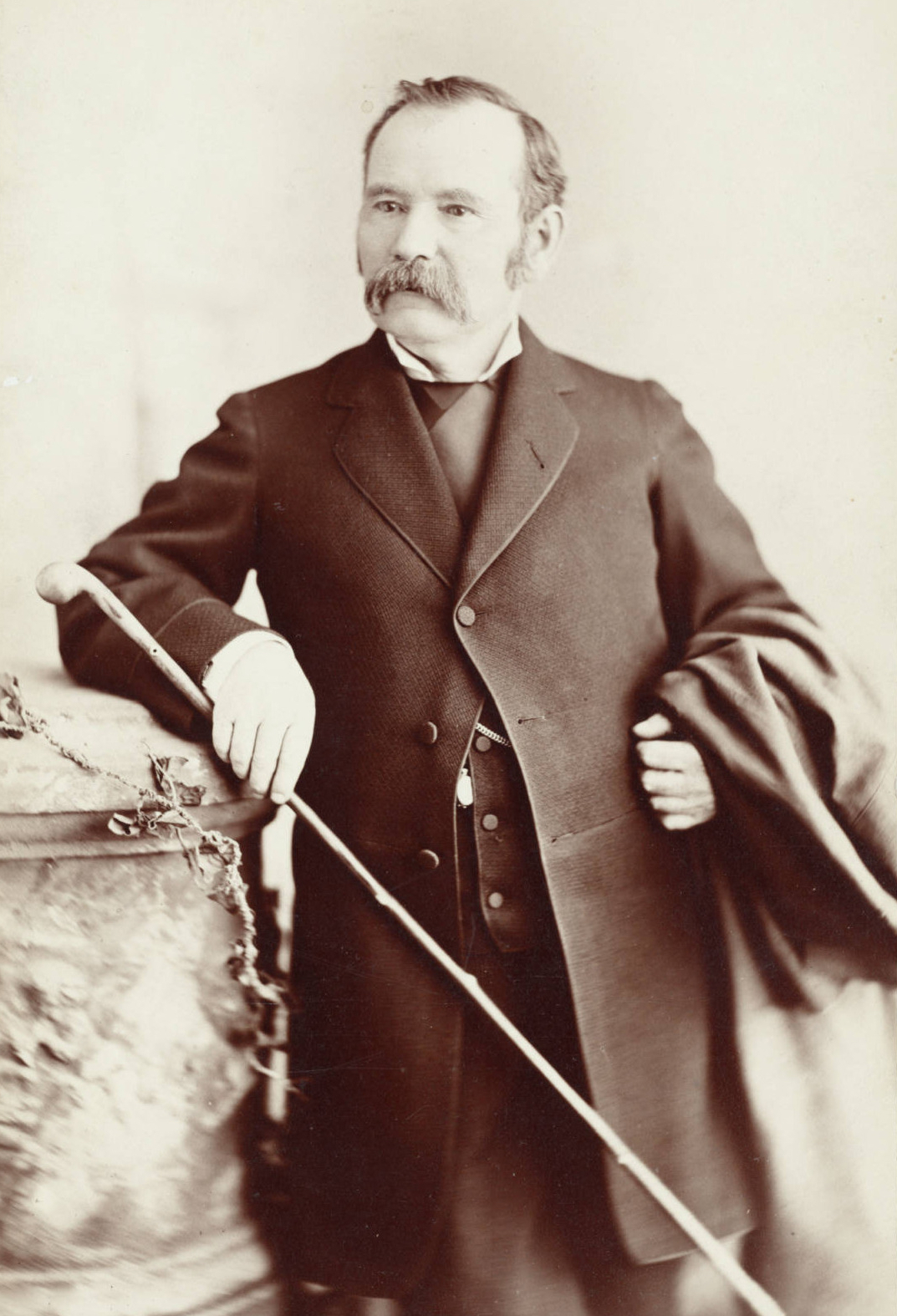
- Routt, circa 1885

1st and 7th Governor of Colorado
- In office January 13, 1891 – January 10, 1893
- Lieutenant: William Story
- Preceded by: Job Adams Cooper
- Succeeded by: Davis H. Waite
- In office November 3, 1876 – January 14, 1879
- Lieutenant: Lafayette Head
- Preceded by: Himself (as Governor of the Territory of Colorado)
- Succeeded by: Frederick W. Pitkin

8th Governor of the Territory of Colorado
- In office March 29, 1875 – November 3, 1876
- Preceded by: Edward M. McCook
- Succeeded by: Himself (as Governor of the State)

17th Mayor of Denver
- In office 1883–1885
- Preceded by: Robert Morris
- Succeeded by: Joseph E. Bates

Personal details
- Born: April 25, 1826 Eddyville, Kentucky, U.S.
- Died: August 13, 1907 (aged 81) Denver, Colorado, U.S.
- Party: Republican
- Spouse: Eliza F. Pickrell Routt (m.1874)
- Children: 6

John Long Routt (April 25, 1826 – August 13, 1907) was an American politician of the Republican Party. Born in Eddyville, Kentucky, he served as the first and seventh governor of Colorado from 1876 to 1879 and 1891 to 1893. He also served as mayor of Denver, Colorado, from 1883 to 1885. He died in Denver, Colorado.

== Early years ==
John Long Routt was born in Eddyville, Kentucky, and moved to Bloomington, Illinois shortly thereafter where he completed his public school education. Upon completion of his studies, he worked as a carpenter prior to entering elected office.

While living in Illinois, he attained his first elected office as Sheriff of McLean County, Illinois. Routt's blossoming public service career was abruptly interrupted by service in the American Civil War, during which acted as a captain in the 94th Illinois Volunteer Infantry.

== Governor of Colorado ==
=== Colorado Territory ===
U.S. President Ulysses S. Grant appointed John Routt as the governor of the Territory of Colorado on March 29, 1875. Statehood had long been Colorado's primary interest. Thomas Patterson and Jerome Chaffee, in House Bill 435, initially provided for the creation of the Colorado state government. Routt's time as Territorial Governor was largely spent deliberating the contents of the Colorado state constitution.

=== State of Colorado ===
After Colorado was established as a state, the increasingly popular Routt easily won the gubernatorial election without making a single speech in public. As the first governor, Routt tackled the major issues Colorado was facing at the time, including violence in and around the city of Creede, Colorado, as well as problems dealing with county valuations.

Routt was also very popular among the female citizenry of the state because of his strong support for women's suffrage - with nudges from his wife, Eliza Pickrell Routt, a pioneer in the women's suffrage movement. At one point, he arranged a speaking tour for popular women's suffragist Susan B. Anthony and personally escorted her around the state. When women in Colorado first became able to vote in 1893, his wife, Eliza Pickrell Routt, became the first woman to register to vote in Colorado history.

== Later life ==
Following his first two terms as Governor of Colorado, Routt entered the private sector, but re-entered public service again to serve as the mayor of Denver, Colorado from 1883 to 1885. After unsuccessfully running for the United States Senate, Routt ran successfully for the governorship again in 1891, and served as Colorado's seventh Governor until 1893. His third term was marked by a high level of disagreement within the Republicans in Colorado's state government.

Routt was buried in Denver's Riverside Cemetery. Routt County, Colorado and Routt National Forest are named in his honor.

== See also ==
- History of Colorado
- Law and government of Colorado
- List of governors of Colorado
- State of Colorado
- Territory of Colorado

Party political offices
First	Republican nominee for Governor of Colorado; 1876	Succeeded by Frederick Walker Pitkin
Preceded by Job Adams Cooper	Republican nominee for Governor of Colorado; 1890	Succeeded by Joseph Helm
Political offices
Preceded by Edward M. McCook (last territory governor)	Governor of Colorado; 1876–1879	Succeeded by Frederick Walker Pitkin
Preceded by Robert Morris	Mayor of Denver; 1883–1885	Succeeded by Joseph E. Bates
Preceded by Job Adams Cooper	Governor of Colorado; 1891–1893	Succeeded by Davis Hanson Waite
