= Baldwin Gallery =

Contemporary Art Gallery in Aspen, Colorado, USA

Coordinates: 39°11′22″N 106°49′07″W

The Baldwin Gallery is a contemporary art gallery in Aspen, Colorado, established by Richard Edwards in 1994. The gallery features a variety of mainly American but also international contemporary artists and works including painting, drawing, sculpture, photography, video and installation-based work.

== History ==
The gallery was founded in 1994 by Edwards along with the prominent Aspen businessman and philanthropist Harley Baldwin, who died in January 2005.

As stated in the New York Times obituary for Mr. Baldwin in 2005:

After meeting Mr. Edwards, a lawyer and art collector, in 1994, Mr. Baldwin opened Baldwin Gallery and became an art-world player almost overnight. His vast social circle and salesmanship let him mount successful shows of work by New York artists like Jennifer Bartlett, Ross Bleckner and Carroll Dunham, and his gallery helped raise Aspen's profile as a resort with culture as well as glitter.

The gallery opened in a small space but moved in 1997 to a purpose built 8,000-square-foot (740 m^{2}) space in the historic Brand Building in downtown Aspen. Baldwin died in 2005 but the gallery has continued under Edwards' management. In "A Report from Colorado", in Art in America (February 2007), Aspen is described as "A mountain town as rich in beauty as it is in per capita net worth, Aspen has a small but important art scene. Its main venues for contemporary art are the Aspen Art Museum and the Baldwin Gallery." In the body of the article the Baldwin Gallery is described by Art in America as "the serious" commercial gallery in town. The gallery's efforts to present world-renowned artists in the city of Aspen has been acknowledged at both international and national levels and with continuing enthusiastic support from serious art journals around the world.

Baldwin Gallery was included in international art magazine Modern Painters' comprehensive list of the ‘Top 500 Galleries in the World’ in a special issue for summer 2013. Baldwin Gallery is the only gallery in Colorado, and the only American gallery located in a city with a population less than 100,000 to be included.

Over the following decade, the gallery continued under the sole direction of Richard Edwards, maintaining a rigorous exhibition schedule featuring solo and group shows by major contemporary artists.

Entering its third decade, the Baldwin Gallery has remained a primary anchor for contemporary art in the region. The gallery has sustained its tradition of producing high-end artist catalogues and monographs to accompany its programming, marking significant institutional milestones while continuing to bring globally recognized figures in painting, sculpture, and photography to the Rocky Mountain region.

The gallery features solo and group exhibitions of the gallery artists, special projects, and the production of publications relating to the exhibition program.

== Artists ==
Artists featured at the Baldwin Gallery have included:

Donald Baechler, Jennifer Bartlett, Ross Bleckner, Delia Brown, James Lee Byars, Sarah Charlesworth, Christo & Jeanne-Claude, Peter Coffin, Greg Colson, Will Cotton, Stephen Dean, Carroll Dunham, Eric Fischl, Adam Fuss, Ewan Gibbs, Isca Greenfield-Sanders, Tim Hailand, Peter Halley, Lyle Ashton Harris, Todd Hido, Craigie Horsfield, Bryan Hunt, Alex Katz, Annette Lemieux, David Levinthal, Glenn Ligon, Andrew Lord, Martin Maloney, Robert Mapplethorpe, Enrique Martinez Celaya, Ryan McGinness, Marilyn Minter, Malcolm Morley, Elizabeth Murray, Louise Nevelson, Tony Oursler, Jack Pierson, Alexis Rockman, James Rosenquist, Tom Sachs, David Salle, Laurie Simmons, Mike + Doug Starn, Joseph Stashkevetch, Pat Steir, George Stoll, Donald Sultan, Philip Taaffe, Gavin Turk, James Turrell, Bruce Weber, Matthew Weinstein, Ana Benaroya, Sanford Biggers, Sebastian Blanck, Nathan Carter, E.V. Day, Austin Eddy, Inka Essenhigh, Genieve Figgis, Anna Gaskell, Gilbert & George, Alexander Gorlizki, Peter Halley, Michael Hilsman, Jim Hodges, Rebecca Horn, Shara Hughes, Isaac Julien, Mark Licari, Vera Lutter, Dan McCarthy, Ryan McGinley, Matthew Ritchie, Matthew Ronay, Andres Serrano, Gary Simmons, Taryn Simon, Marc Swanson, Mickalene Thomas, Dirk Westphal, and Erwin Wurm.
