= Harley Baldwin =

American land developer and art dealer

- Baldwin in a 1993 Aspen Historical Society photo
- Born: April 17, 1945; Chicago, US
- Died: January 23, 2005 (aged 59); New York City, US
- Education: Syracuse University
- Occupations: Property developer, art dealer
- Known for: Participating in the high end business development of Aspen, Colorado; a partner in the development of Bridgemarket in Manhattan
- Partner: Richard Edwards

Harley Baldwin (April 17, 1945 – January 23, 2005) was an American developer and art dealer who divided his time between residences in Aspen, Colorado, and New York City. He was best known for his successes in the former community, where the upscale boutiques and exclusive nightclub that opened in two historic buildings he renovated eventually lent the ski-resort community the nickname "Glitter Gulch". While this was controversial in a community that had long prided itself on its lack of pretension, he was generally seen positively in Aspen

== Early life ==
Born in Chicago to an Air Force colonel in 1945, he grew up a military brat on bases all over the United States. He earned a degree in international relations from Syracuse University and initially worked in New York City as a welfare caseworker and promotions director for Show magazine. After a year, still under a draft deferment, he left the city and drove west with a family fortune of $1,200. At a turn in the road he decided to go to Aspen.

== Career ==
Soon after arriving in Aspen, he rented a trailer to live in. He bought some pans and groceries and started selling crêpes from the red Popcorn Wagon, which is still used for that purpose in Aspen today. This earned him enough money to buy the trailer. and, four months later, a ranch. This was the beginning of a career in real estate. With a partner, he bought land on the shores of Ruedi Reservoir outside nearby Basalt, recently created by damming the Fryingpan River, and subdivided it into Ruedi Shores.

In 1971, he persuaded Robert Orville Anderson, then chairman of Atlantic Richfield, to lend him $170,000 ($1,351,000 in contemporary dollars) to buy the aging Brand Building in downtown Aspen, across from Aspen City Hall. Built in 1891, near the end of the Colorado Silver Boom that had spurred the city's initial growth, it had been used as a gas station for much of the 20th century and was slated for demolition. After the purchase, Baldwin restored it.

Also that year, Baldwin married Lee Webster. The following year, 1972, feeling local opposition to some of his other projects was too great to overcome, he and Webster moved to New York to pursue opportunities there. They maintained their properties and residence in Aspen, and continued to look after those investments. The couple divorced in 1977.

In New York, he was primarily involved in developing Bridgemarket, a food store under the Manhattan approach to the Queensboro Bridge. The process took longer than Baldwin anticipated, and during it the plans were changed considerably from Baldwin's original vision. It finally opened in 1999, with other developers involved.

His apartment in The Dakota became the subject of a lawsuit in 1992. Earlier that year, Michelle Pfeiffer had agreed to sublet it from him while she filmed The Age of Innocence. When her movers arrived the day before principal photography began, they were refused entrance, ostensibly because the service entrance was closed for the day. She later discovered, she claimed, that Baldwin had not had obtained the permission of the Dakota's co-op board before subletting the apartment, as he was required to, and that he was about to default on the mortgage. Baldwin tried to persuade her to move in again, but refused to return her money when she decided to abandon the sublet. She moved into a hotel instead for the duration of the film, and later won a default judgement against him.

Glitter Gulch

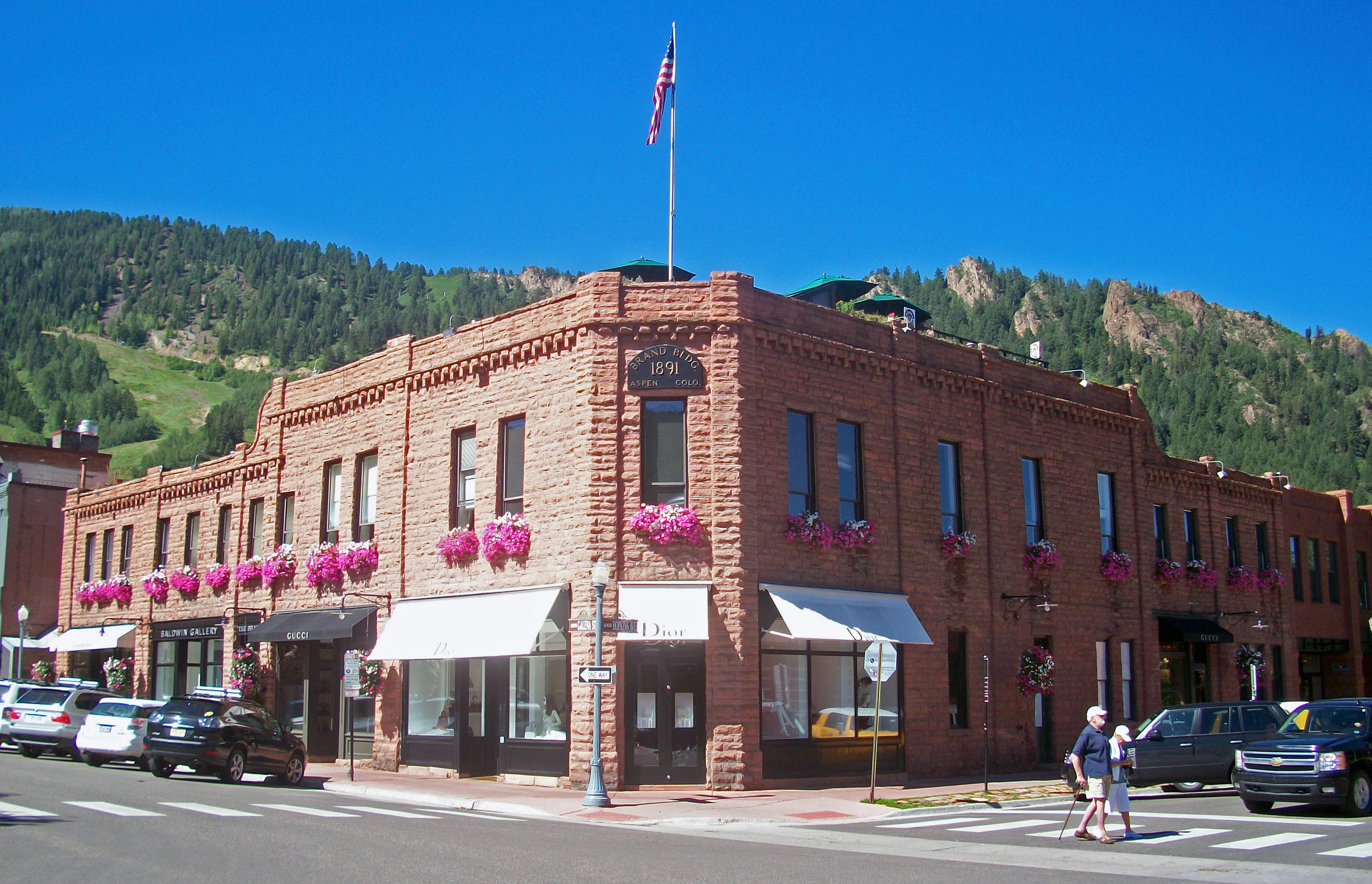
The Brand Building

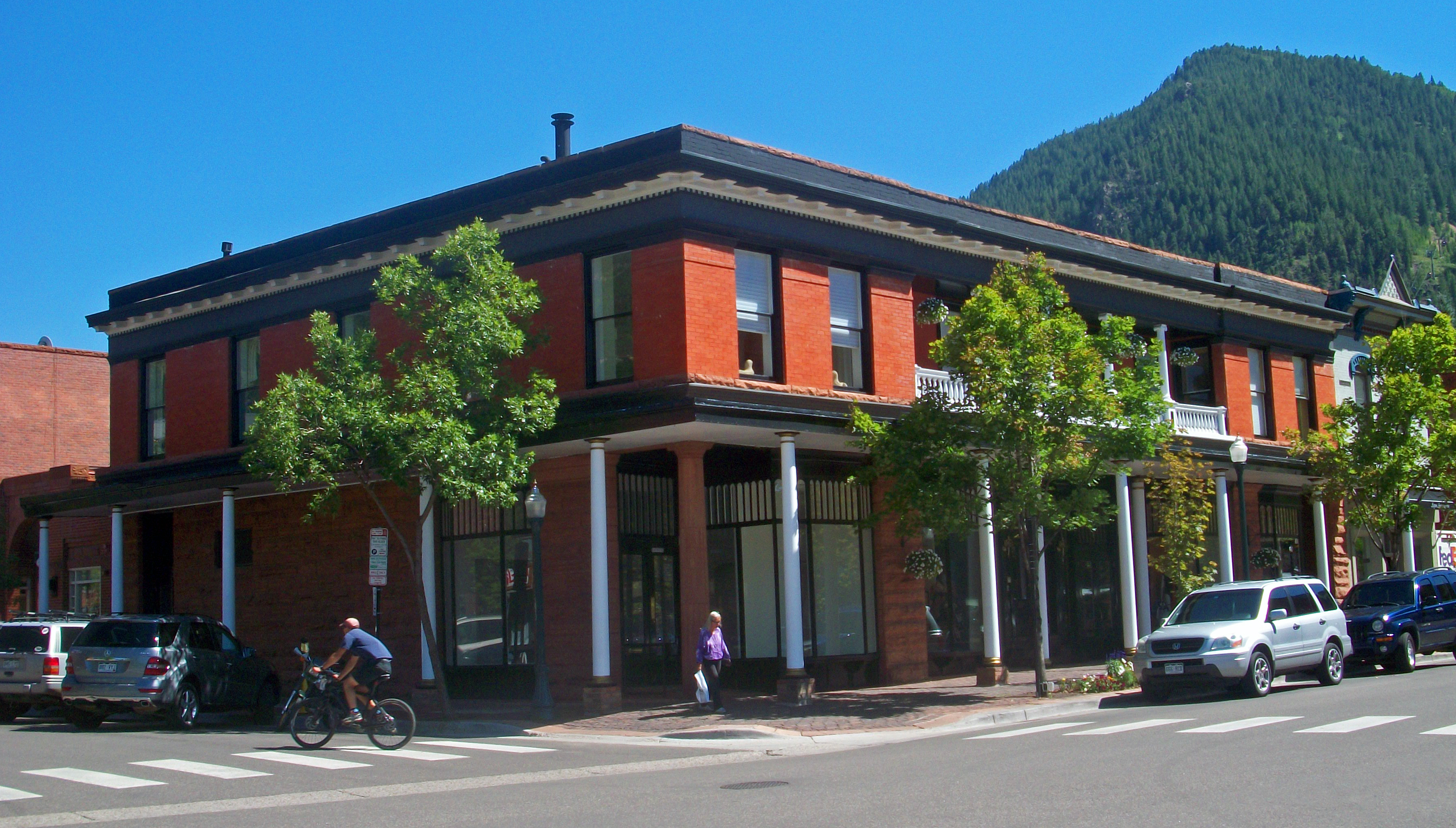
The Collins Block

Back in Aspen in 1988, he bought the Brand's neighbor, the Collins Block, another historic building from the city's boom years. He used them to join with other developers to effect a transformation of Aspen's image. Where a funeral parlor and hardware store had once been, luxury boutiques like Louis Vuitton, Dior and Bulgari are now located. In the basement of the Collins he opened the Caribou Club, a members-only nightspot. The second floor of the Brand was given over to high-end hotel and apartment space. Similarly, he renovated the upper floor of the Collins into a 6,000-square-foot (560 m^{2}) penthouse for himself and his companion Richard Edwards that Architectural Digest featured in 1996.

The emergence of the Caribou and the boutiques disturbed some Aspenites, who saw it as a challenge to the egalitarian mentality that had long predominated locally despite the area's many rich and famous residents. The buildings were referred to as "Glitter Gulch", a nickname later applied to Aspen itself . Baldwin saw it as inevitable and logical. "Aspen is for the most successful people in the world." he said in a 2001 Vanity Fair article. "It so happens that they like to wear Gucci. Where's the problem?" George Hamilton, a friend, defended him as "what Aspen is all about ... He understands classic good taste and at the same time is irreverent about it."

He started more businesses, bringing the total he owned in Aspen to 12. One sold silver belt buckles he had designed himself. The other was an art gallery, a conscious attempt on his part to raise the cultural profile of his adopted hometown, already known in the classical music community for the annual Aspen Music Festival and School, to which he contributed money and sat on the board. Very quickly, the Baldwin Gallery, in the Brand's South Galena Street frontage, had the effect he had hoped, selling work by internationally prominent contemporary artists like Jennifer Bartlett and Ross Bleckner.

== Death ==
In 2004 Baldwin became ill with kidney cancer. He and Edwards began spending more time in Manhattan. On January 23, 2005, he died at Memorial Sloan–Kettering Cancer Center.

== See also ==
- List of Syracuse University people
