= Glitter Gulch =

Glitter Gulch may refer to:

- "Glitter Gulch", a nickname for the casino area along Fremont Street in downtown Las Vegas

Glitter Gultch was a gentlemen’s club on Fremont street

- "Glitter Gulch", a nickname for the Collins Block and Brand Building in Aspen, Colorado, with their high concentration of upscale boutiques, and Aspen generally.
- Glitter Gulch EP by British group Nine Black Alps
- "Glitter Gulch", a song from the Elvis Costello album King of America
- "Glitter Gulch," an essay by Greg Baxter in The Dublin Review, issue 34
- "Glitter Gulch," a discontinued Oakley, Inc. frame colour option on the original Oakley Zero series.
- "Glitter Gulch," a television film in The Garfield Show.
