= Lake Fork =

Lake Fork may refer to:

- Lake Fork, Illinois, a village
- Lake Fork (Arkansas River tributary), in Colorado
- Lake Fork Gunnison River, in Colorado
- Lake Fork Mohican River, in Ohio
- Lake Fork Creek, or Lake Fork of the Sabine River, in Texas
  - Lake Fork Reservoir, on Lake Fork Creek in Texas
- Lake Fork Peak, a mountain in New Mexico
