= Sugar Loaf Dam =

Coordinates: 39°15′11″N 106°22′20″W

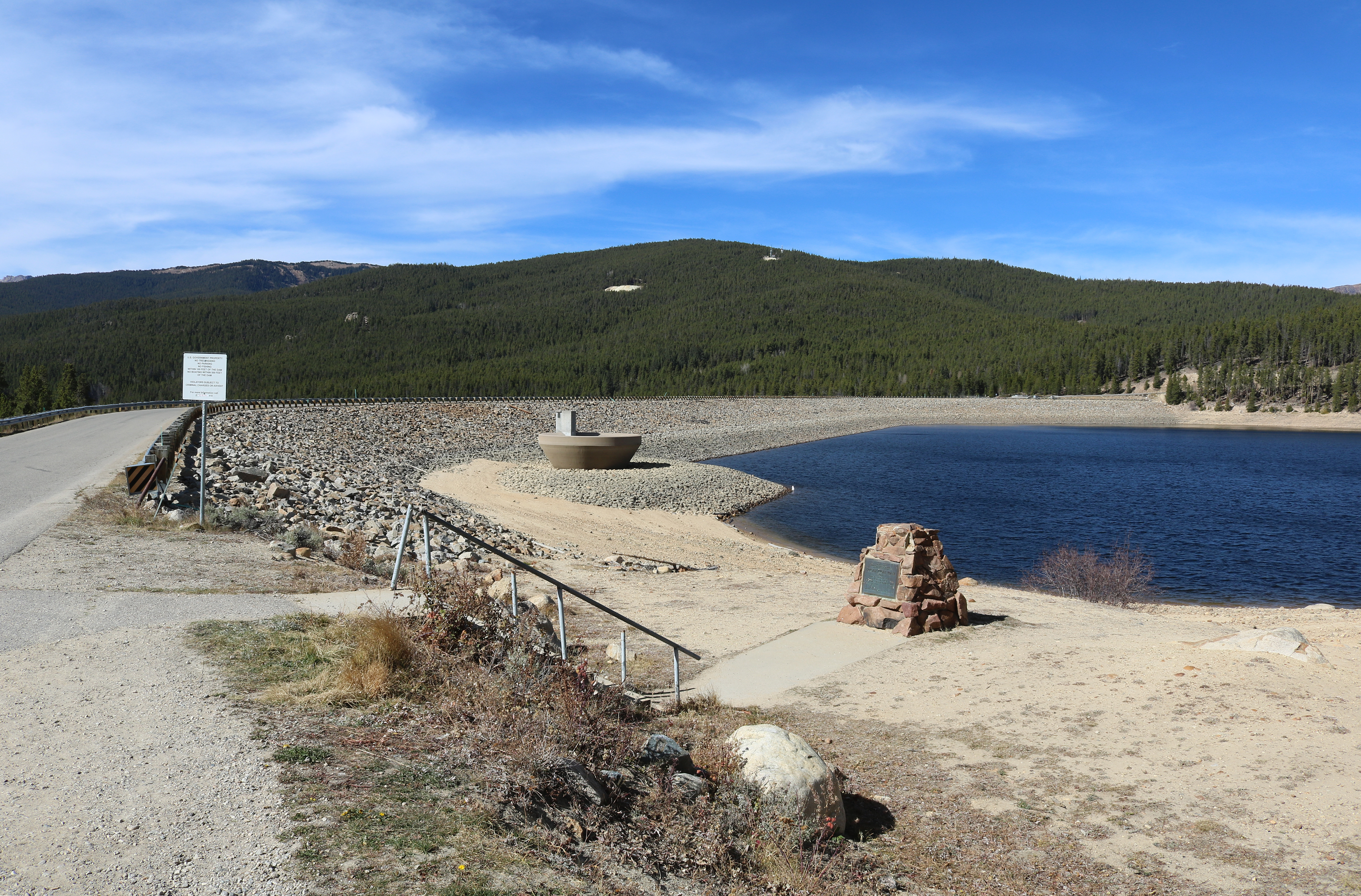
The dam in October, with drawn-down water levels from summer irrigation

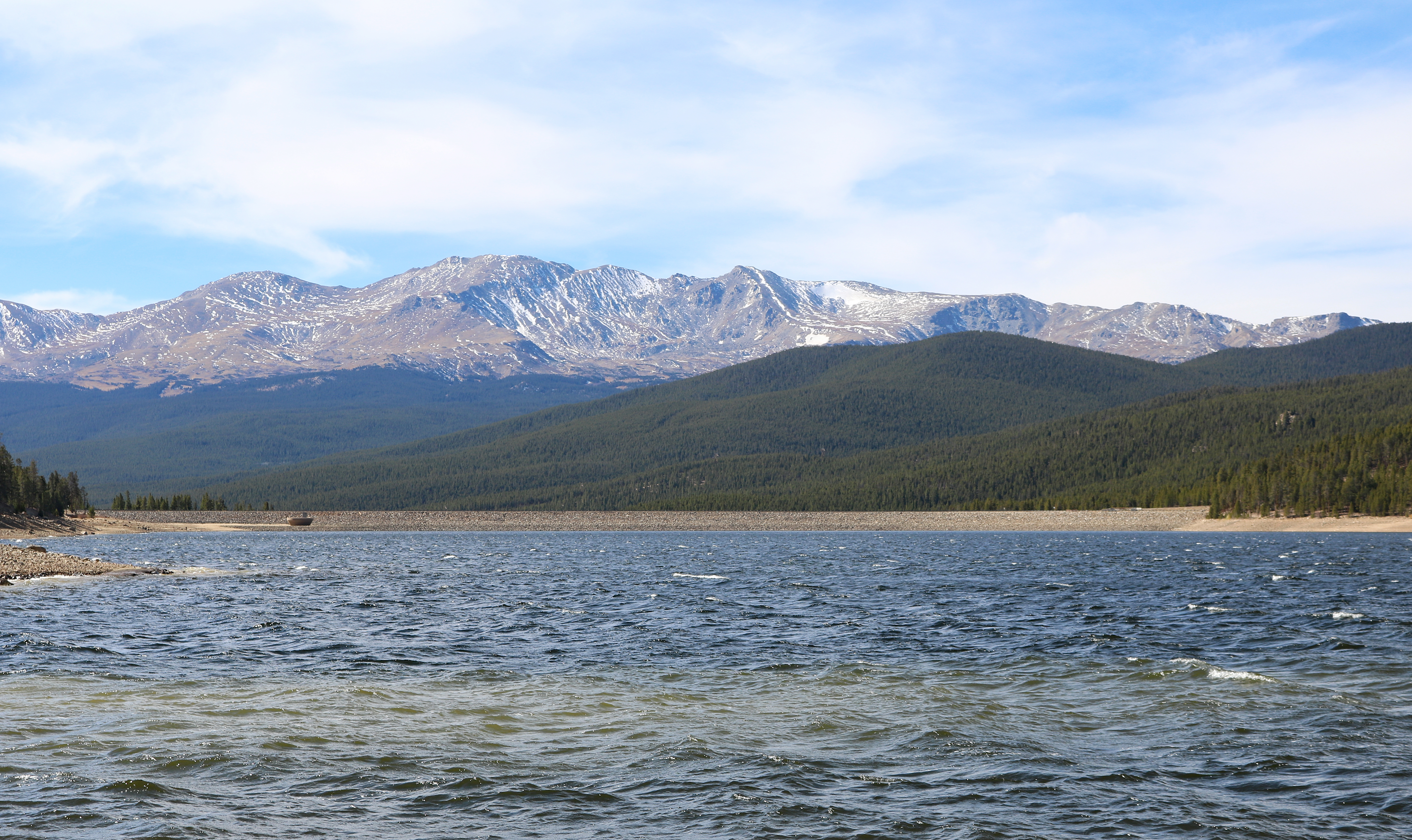
Turquoise Lake, looking towards the dam and Mount Massive

Sugar Loaf Dam is a dam in Lake County, Colorado, 4 miles (6.4 km) west of Leadville.

It has a height of 135 feet (41 m) feet and is over 2,000 feet (610 m) long at its crest, impounding the Lake Fork of the Arkansas River near its headwaters. The earthen dam was one of five reservoir dams completed from 1965 to 1968 by the United States Bureau of Reclamation as part of the larger water diversion project named the Fryingpan-Arkansas Project. The project was authorized in 1962 by President Kennedy and was completed in 1981.

The Fry-Ark diverts water across the continental divide from the Colorado River basin. This water is delivered to the more arid plains east of the Rocky Mountains. Although the predominant use is agricultural, some water is available to several cities east of the continental divide, including: Colorado Springs, Pueblo, La Junta, Lamar. Water is diverted from the West Slope's Fryingpan River basin through a series of interconnected tunnels and small diversion dams into the Charles H. Boustead Tunnel. The Boustead runs water underneath the Continental Divide 5.5 miles (8.9 km) before discharging it into Turquoise Lake. Water then leaves Turquoise Lake via the Mt. Elbert Conduit, which runs nearly 11 miles (18 km) to the Mt. Elbert Forebay, then dropped down over 0.5 miles (0.80 km) in elevation to the hydro-electric Mt. Elbert Power Plant.

Turquoise Lake is the reservoir created by the dam. It has a surface area of 1,780 acres (720 ha) and a capacity of 129,440 acre-feet (159,660,000 cubic meters). The lake and its surrounding land provide various recreational activities for visitors in both the summer and winter.

== Climate ==
Sugar Loaf Dam has a subarctic climate (Köppen Dfc).

Climate data for Sugar Loaf Reservoir, Colorado, 1991–2020 normals, 1900-2020 extremes: 9738ft (2968m)
Month	Jan	Feb	Mar	Apr	May	Jun	Jul	Aug	Sep	Oct	Nov	Dec	Year
Record high °F (°C)	59 (15)	55 (13)	60 (16)	74 (23)	78 (26)	90 (32)	95 (35)	97 (36)	88 (31)	78 (26)	68 (20)	60 (16)	97 (36)
Mean maximum °F (°C)	48 (9)	48 (9)	53 (12)	59 (15)	69 (21)	78 (26)	81 (27)	78 (26)	74 (23)	66 (19)	55 (13)	48 (9)	82 (28)
Mean daily maximum °F (°C)	31.5 (−0.3)	32.7 (0.4)	39.2 (4.0)	44.3 (6.8)	55.2 (12.9)	68.0 (20.0)	72.7 (22.6)	69.6 (20.9)	61.9 (16.6)	51.0 (10.6)	39.3 (4.1)	30.9 (−0.6)	49.7 (9.8)
Daily mean °F (°C)	17.5 (−8.1)	18.0 (−7.8)	24.3 (−4.3)	31.1 (−0.5)	41.0 (5.0)	51.1 (10.6)	56.1 (13.4)	53.9 (12.2)	46.7 (8.2)	37.2 (2.9)	26.6 (−3.0)	18.4 (−7.6)	35.2 (1.8)
Mean daily minimum °F (°C)	3.4 (−15.9)	3.4 (−15.9)	9.3 (−12.6)	17.9 (−7.8)	26.8 (−2.9)	34.3 (1.3)	39.5 (4.2)	38.2 (3.4)	31.4 (−0.3)	23.5 (−4.7)	13.9 (−10.1)	5.9 (−14.5)	20.6 (−6.3)
Mean minimum °F (°C)	−14 (−26)	−15 (−26)	−10 (−23)	2 (−17)	15 (−9)	26 (−3)	33 (1)	31 (−1)	21 (−6)	9 (−13)	−5 (−21)	−13 (−25)	−19 (−28)
Record low °F (°C)	−55 (−48)	−49 (−45)	−44 (−42)	−22 (−30)	−11 (−24)	17 (−8)	25 (−4)	23 (−5)	4 (−16)	−9 (−23)	−32 (−36)	−38 (−39)	−55 (−48)
Average precipitation inches (mm)	0.97 (25)	1.43 (36)	1.34 (34)	1.71 (43)	1.40 (36)	0.93 (24)	1.86 (47)	2.10 (53)	1.42 (36)	1.05 (27)	1.30 (33)	1.06 (27)	16.57 (421)
Average snowfall inches (cm)	16.0 (41)	16.7 (42)	14.8 (38)	13.6 (35)	5.5 (14)	0.2 (0.51)	trace	trace	0.3 (0.76)	4.5 (11)	12.2 (31)	13.6 (35)	97.4 (248.27)
Source 1: NOAA
Source 2: XMACIS (snowfall, records & monthly max/mins)
