= Twin Lakes Dam =

Dam in Colorado, U.S.

Coordinates: 39°05′36″N 106°20′39″W

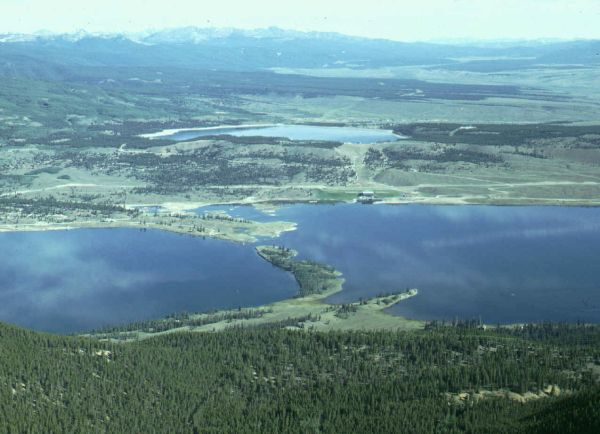
- Interactive map of Twin Lakes Dam
- Country: United States
- Location: Lake County, Colorado
- Status: Operational
- Opening date: 1978
- Built by: United States Bureau of Reclamation
- Designed by: United States Bureau of Reclamation

Dam and spillways
- Height: 53 ft (16 m)
- Length: 3,150 ft (960 m)

Reservoir
- Total capacity: 141,000 acre⋅ft (174,000,000 m^{3})
- Surface area: 2,700 acres (1,100 ha)
- Normal elevation: 2,803 m (9,196 ft)

Twin Lakes Dam (National ID # CO02045) is a dam in Lake County, Colorado, about 13 miles (21 km) south of Leadville.

The earthen dam was constructed in 1978 by the United States Bureau of Reclamation with a height of 53 feet (16 m) and a length at its crest of 3,150 feet (960 m). The dam is owned and operated by the Bureau as one element of its larger "transbasin" Fryingpan-Arkansas Project, which transfers available water from Colorado's West Slope across the Continental Divide to the more arid, and more populated, East Slope.

The reservoir it creates, Twin Lakes, is an enlargement of a natural glacial lake. It has a surface area of 2,700 acres (1,100 ha) and a maximum capacity of 141,000 acre-feet (174,000,000 m^{3}). Recreation includes boating, fishing for trout, and camping at five Forest Service campgrounds in the area (Dexter, Lakeview, Parry Peak, Twin Peaks and White Star).
