= Riyaz Uddin (painter) =

Indian miniature painter from Jaipur

Riyaz Uddin is an Indian miniature painter from Jaipur Jaipur is in India. He has collaborated with British artist Alexander Gorlizki to produce cross-cultural artworks.
