= Fryingpan–Arkansas Project =

Water diversion and storage project in Colorado, US

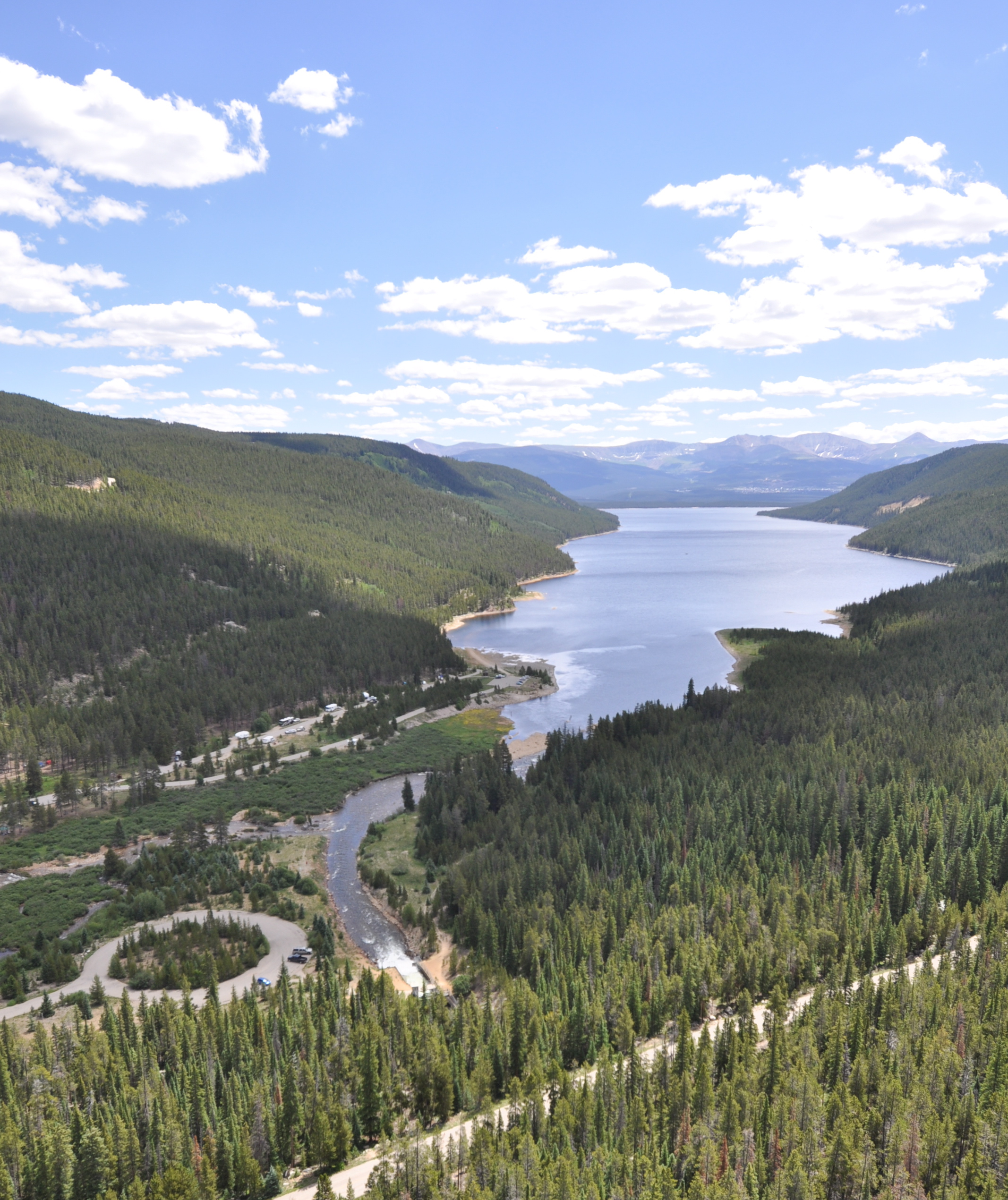
The Boustead Tunnel (bottom left) discharges into and fills Turquoise Reservoir

The Fryingpan–Arkansas Project, or "Fry-Ark," is a water diversion, storage and delivery project serving southeastern Colorado. The multi-purpose project was authorized in 1962 by President Kennedy to serve municipal, industrial, and hydroelectric power generation, and to enhance recreation, fish and wildlife interests. Construction began in 1964 and was completed in 1981. The project includes five dams and reservoirs, one federal hydroelectric power plant (two private, FERC regulated plants), and 22 tunnels and conduits totaling 87 miles (140 km) in length. The Bureau of Reclamation, under the Department of the Interior built and manages the project.

Like its sister–project, the Colorado–Big Thompson Project, the Fry-Ark brings available water from Colorado's West Slope to the more arid, and more heavily populated, East Slope, providing supplemental water to over 720,000 people and 280,600 acres (113,600 ha) of irrigable land in Colorado Springs, Pueblo, La Junta, Lamar, and other southeastern Colorado municipalities each year.

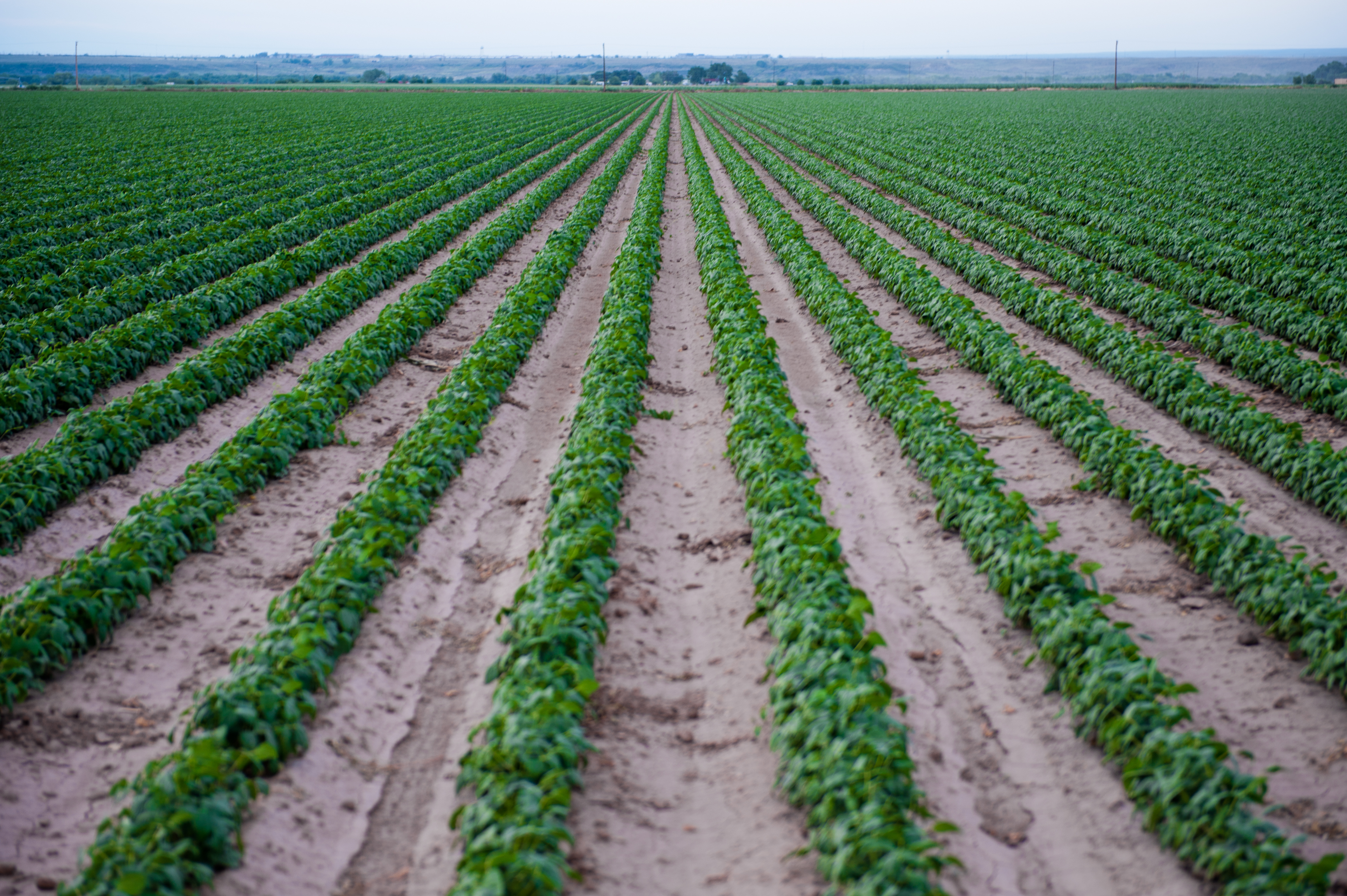
Lower Arkansas Valley Agriculture served by the Fryingpan-Arkansas Project

== Operation ==
The project diverts and delivers an average of 52,000 acre⋅ft (64,000,000 m^{3}) of water a year. However, the water right on the Fry-Ark allows for a diversion of 2,352,800 acre⋅ft (2.9021×10^{9} m^{3}) over the course of 34 consecutive years, but not to exceed a diversion of 120,000 acre⋅ft (150,000,000 m^{3}) in any one single year. In 2011, when Colorado had an abundance of snow, the Fry-Ark imported about 98,000 acre⋅ft (121,000,000 m^{3}) from the West Slope, the second highest diversion amount in the project's 50-year operating history. The following year, 2012, snowpack was scarce and drought returned to the state. As a result, the project was only able to import roughly 14,000 acre⋅ft (17,000,000 m^{3}) of water.

Before the Fry-Ark Project could be built in its entirety, a compromise had to be struck between East and West Slope water politics. The result was the construction of Ruedi Reservoir, 15 miles (24 km) upstream on the Fryingpan River from Basalt, Colorado. Ruedi provides water to Colorado's West Slope, in part to compensate for what is diverted further upstream.

Water is diverted from the West Slope's Fryingpan River basin. A series of interconnected tunnels carrying water from 16 small diversion dams, all at an elevation of above 10,000 feet (3,000 m), collect snowmelt and run it, via gravity, to the Charles H. Boustead Tunnel. The Boustead conveys water underneath the Continental Divide 5.5 miles (8.9 km) before discharging it into Turquoise Lake just west of Leadville. Water then leaves Turquoise Lake reservoir via the Mt. Elbert Conduit, which runs nearly 11 miles (18 km) to the Mt. Elbert Forebay. Water is stored in the forebay to build up head (energy) before being dropped down over 0.5 miles (0.80 km) in elevation to the hydroelectric Mt. Elbert Powerplant.

The power plant takes its name from Mount Elbert, Colorado's tallest peak, and sits at its base. The two-unit facility is the largest hydroelectric power plant in Colorado. It has a nameplate capacity of 200 megawatts and a maximum generating head of 477 feet (145 m). During night time hours, when power rates are less expensive, the reversible pump-back units return water from Twin Lakes—water that was already used at least once by the units to generate electricity—back to the forebay so it can flow down again for more power generation. The Western Area Power Administration markets the power generated at the plant.

Water exiting the Mt. Elbert Power Plant helps fill Twin Lakes Reservoir, a natural lake bed that was enlarged and impounded by the Twin Lakes Dam during 1978–1980. The reservoir sits on Lake Creek which runs down from Independence Pass. Water from the reservoir continues down Lake Creek to the Arkansas River, which is the main delivery vehicle for the Fry-Ark project.

Pueblo Reservoir, the center piece of Lake Pueblo State Park, is the last reservoir in the project and sits on the Arkansas just west of Pueblo. The majority of municipal and agricultural deliveries for the project are made out of Pueblo Reservoir before the water continues on east to Kansas via the Arkansas.

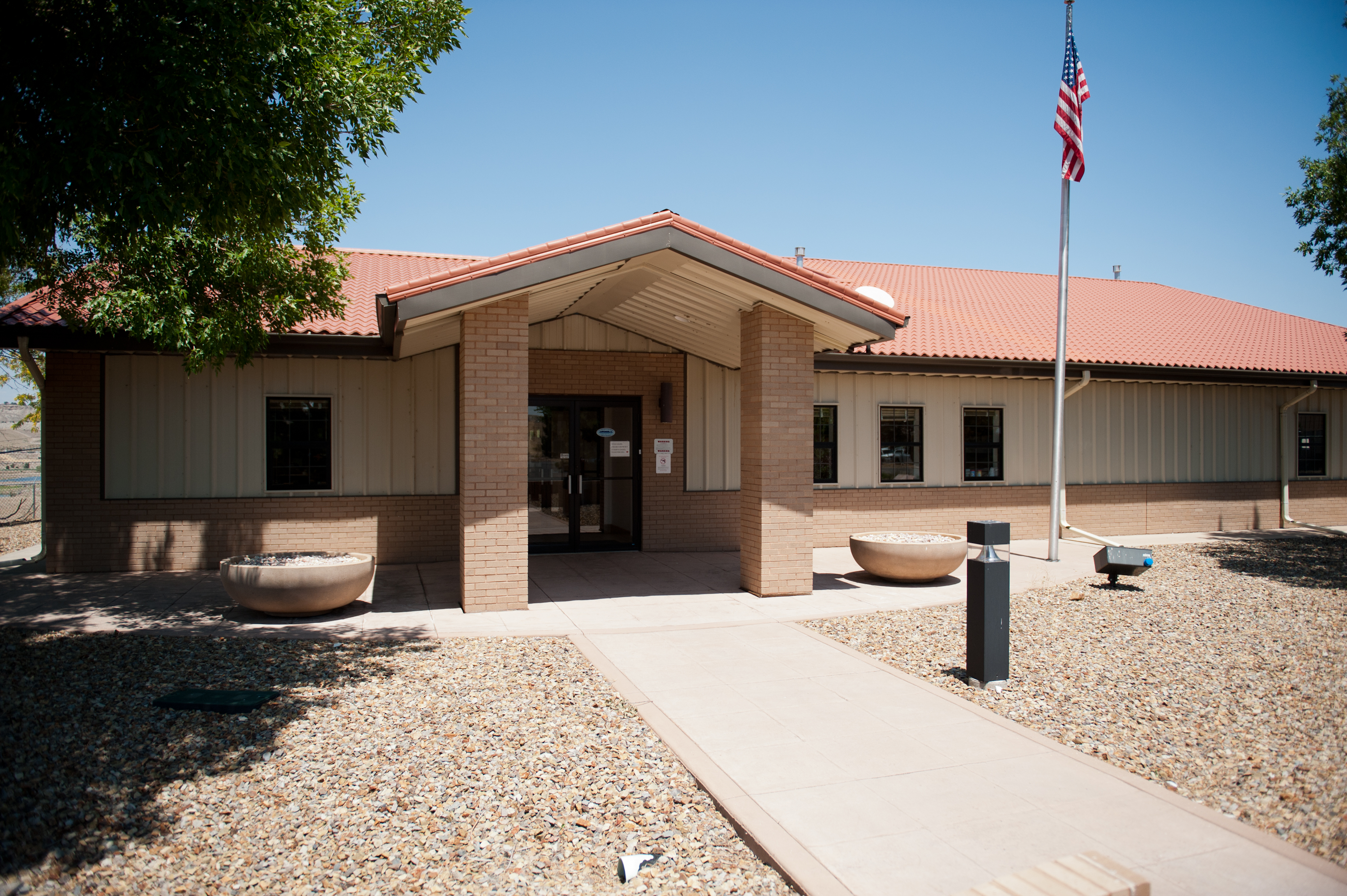
The Pueblo Field Office of the Bureau of Reclamation

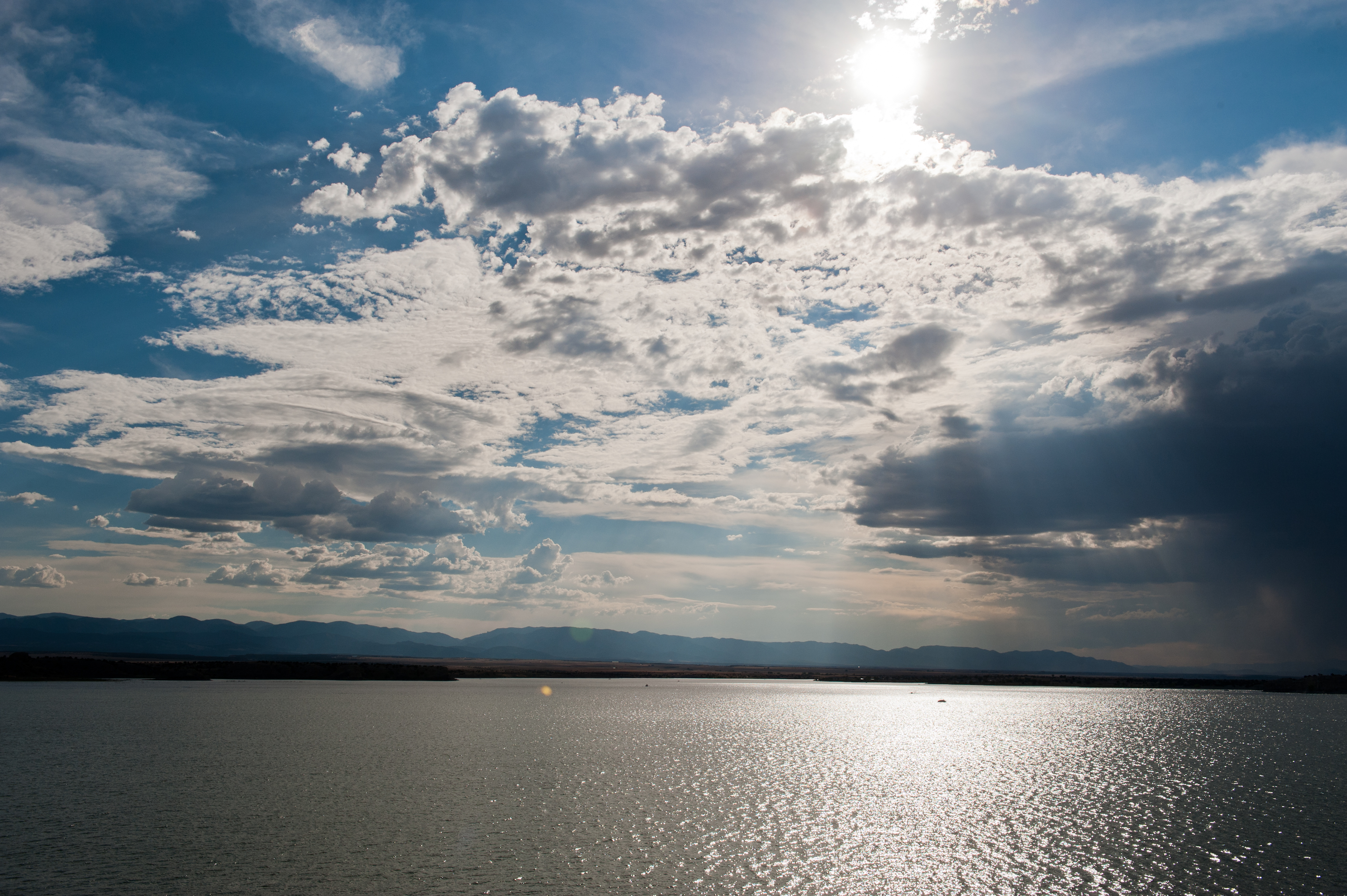
Late afternoon at Lake Pueblo

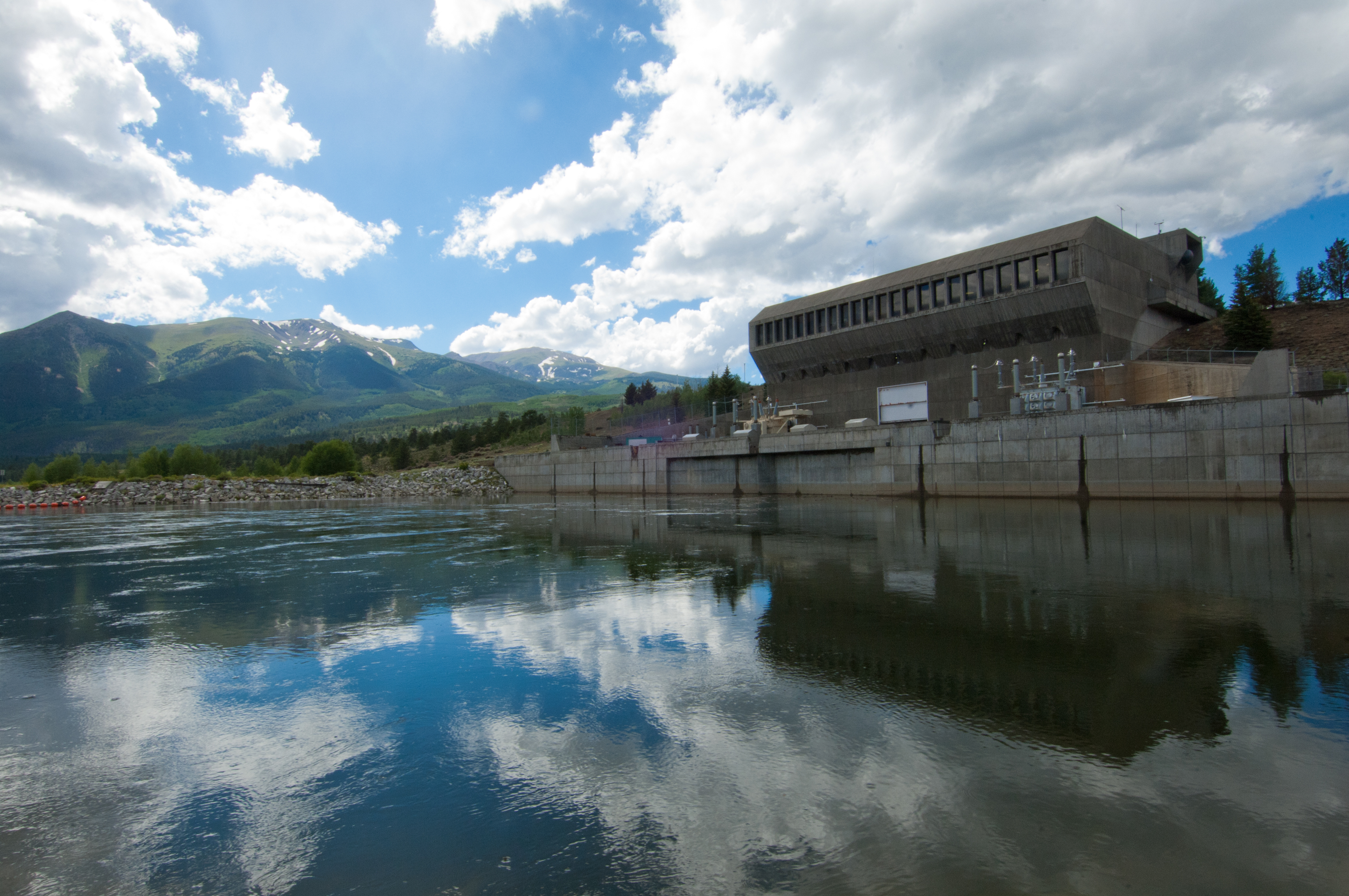
Mt. Elbert Power Plant on Twin Lakes

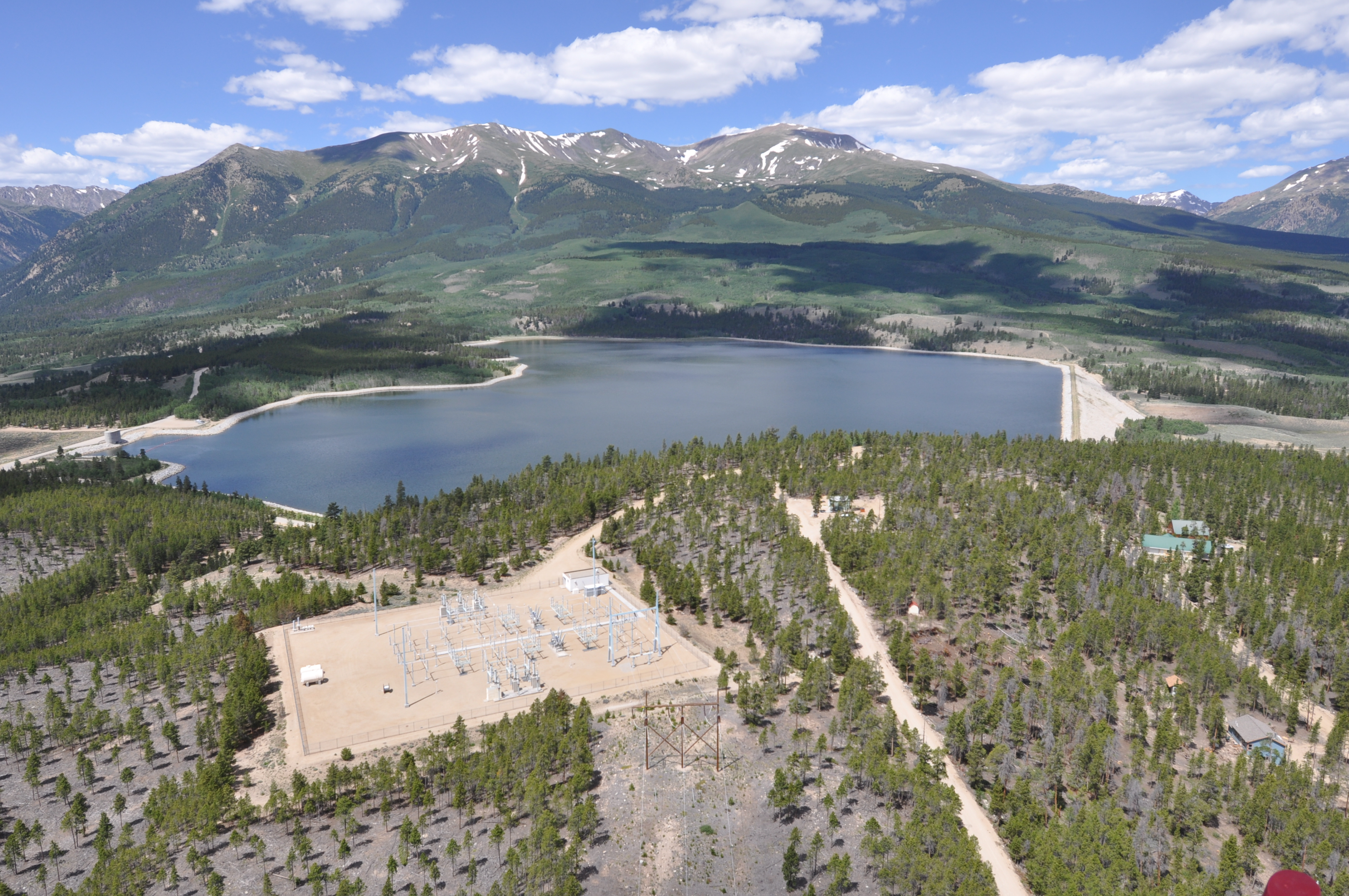
Mt. Elbert Forebay with Mount Elbert in the background
