= Peter Coffin (artist) =

American sculptural artist (born 1972)

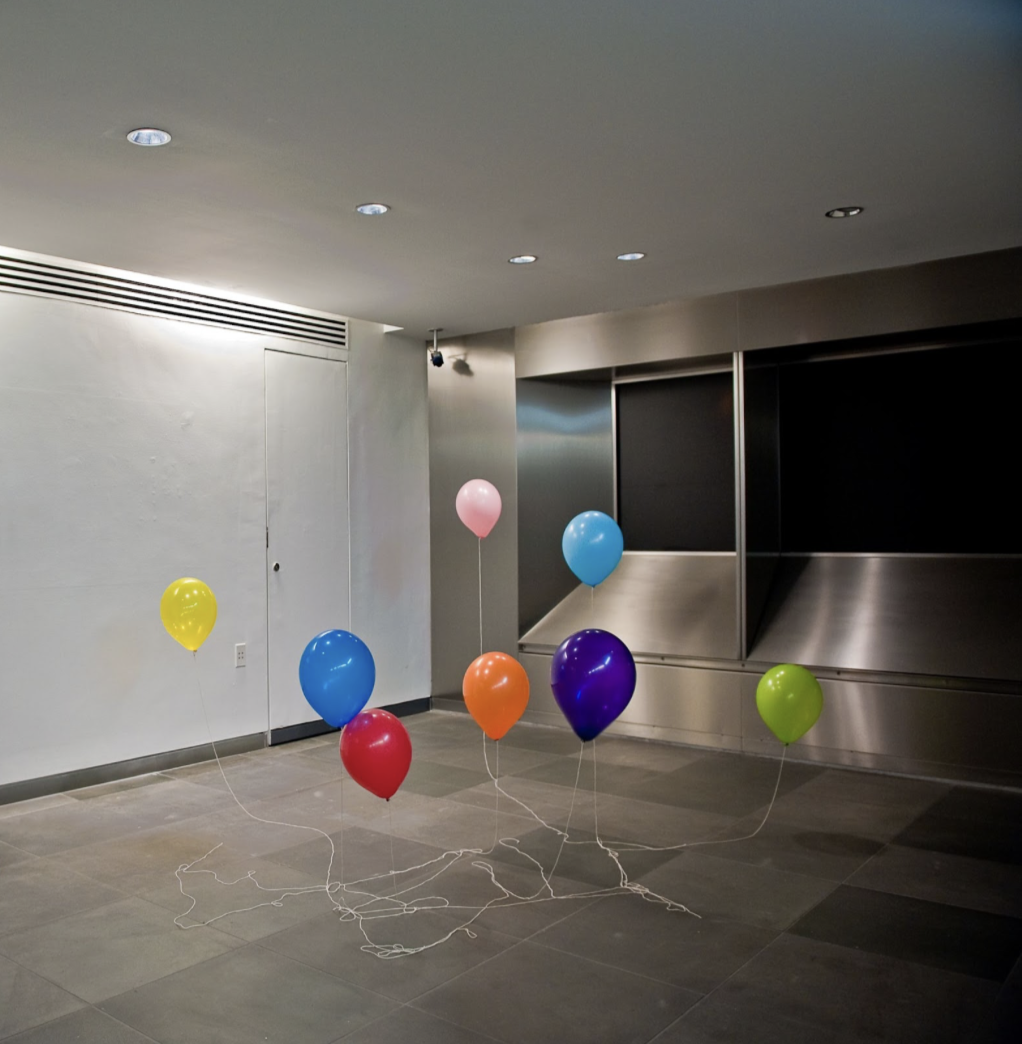
- Untitled (Balloon Equilibrium), 2010. Balloons, helium, air and string. Dimensions variable. Exhibited at the Austrian Cultural Forum gallery, NY Curated by Severin Duensler and Emmanuel Layr
- Born: 1972 (age 53–54); Berkeley, California, US
- Education: University of California, Davis; Carnegie Mellon University
- Occupation: artist
- Awards: Smithsonian Fellowship
- Website: petercoffinstudio.com

Peter Coffin (born 1972) is an American multi-disciplinary artist based in New York City.

== Education ==
Coffin graduated from the University of California, Davis, where he received a B.A. and B.S. He studied under Conrad Atkinson and Lynn Hershman Leeson and connected with California funk artist Robert Arneson and conceptual artist Stephen J. Kaltenbach. He received an M.F.A. from Carnegie Mellon University in 2000.

== Work ==
Peter Coffin's diverse practice includes sculpture, installation, video, sound and two-dimensional art. His art explores conceptual points of view that invite new perspectives and engender inquiry. Playful ideation is the hallmark of Coffin's artwork, utilizing representation, culture, and epistemology to examine consciousness and apperception. French critic and curator Nicolas Bourriaud has said that Coffin's art "explores the accepted and expected reality with the imagination that constitutes the concrete source of art today".

In 2001, Coffin installed a greenhouse in Andrew Kreps Gallery in New York, where musicians were invited to play music for plants, highlighting a cultural phenomenon and an enthusiasm surrounding the research of plant consciousness in the 1960s and ‘70s. Similarly, Untitled (Play), 2008, Untitled (Dreaming Seagull), 2006, and Untitled (Prelapsarian), 2012, invite viewers to imagine consciousness outside of their own. Continuing this investigation, Coffin drew inspiration from Carl Jung's Flying Saucers: A Modern Myth of Things Seen in the Skies, to create a full-scale UFO modeled after popular representations and documented sightings, and initially flew it over the Baltic Sea in 2008 while a team of sociologists interviewed witnesses. Subsequent flights include the southwest coast of Brazil in 2010 and the Mojave Desert in 2013. In a series of museum exhibitions (Untitled (Tate Britain), Untitled (Pompidou) and Untitled (Smithsonian Museum)), a similarly playful approach was taken to interrogate art engagement by animating and changing the appearance of artworks through choreographed sound and video projection.

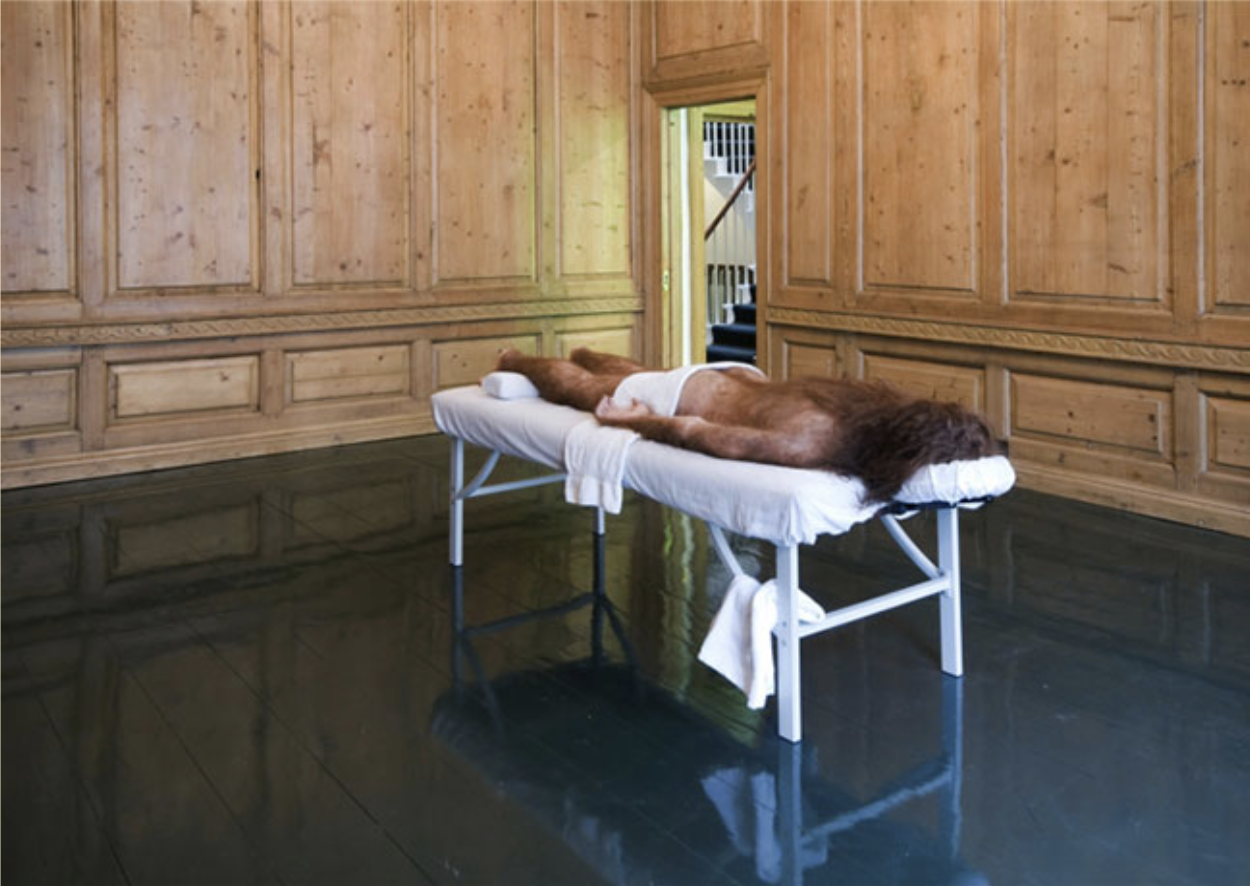
Untitled (Prelapsarian), Rubber, hair, pigment and massage table. 24 x 75 x 36 inches at Carl Kostyál

== Exhibitions ==
Coffin's work has been the subject of several solo exhibitions, including the Smithsonian Hirshhorn Museum and Sculpture Garden, Washington D.C. (2012); the Center d'art Contemporarian, Ivry (2010); the Barbican, London (2009); City Hall Park, New York City (2009); the Aspen Art Museum (2009); the Wattis Institute for Contemporary Arts, San Francisco (2009); Centre d'Art Contemporain, Fribourg (2008); Palais de Tokyo, Paris (2007); and le Confort Moderne, Poitier (2007). Coffin has had solo gallery exhibitions with the National Exemplar, NY; Baldwin Gallery, Aspen; Venus Over Manhattan, NY; Gallery Fonti, Naples, Italy; Carl Kostyál Gallery, London; Herald St, London; Perrotin, Paris; Andrew Kreps Gallery, New York; and Michael Benevento Gallery, Los Angeles. His work has been exhibited at the Singapore Art Museum; Schirn Kunsthalle, Frankfurt; Centro Andaluz de Arte Contemporaneo, Seville; Yerba Buena Center for the Arts, San Francisco (All 2014); The Geffen Contemporary at MoCA, Los Angeles, CA; Storm King Art Center, New Windsor, NY, (Both 2012); Boston Museum of Fine Arts, Boston, MA; Yokohama Museum of Art, Yokohama, Japan, Musée d'Art Contemporain, Bordeaux, France; Le Musée Océanographique, Villa Paloma in Monaco (All 2011); Israel Museum, Jerusalem, Israel; the Solomon R. Guggenheim Museum, New York, NY (Both 2010), Museo D'Arte Contemporanea Roma (2009); Portland Institute of Contemporary Art, Portland, OR, Museum on the Seam, Jerusalem, Tate Britain, London, UK (All 2009), Museum of Contemporary Art, Miami, Barbican Art Gallery, London, UK; Museo de Arte Contemporanea de Vigo, Vigo, Spain; Tate Modern, London, England; Lenin Museum, Moscow, Russia; le Confort Moderne, Poitier, France; Musée d'art Moderne et Contemporain, Geneva, Switzerland (All 2007); Migros Museum für Gegenwartskunst, Zürich, Switzerland; Wanås Sculpture Park, Skåne, Sweden (Both 2006); PS1/MoMA, NY, (2005, 2004 & 2001); South London Gallery, London, UK (2004).

== Collections ==
Work by Coffin is represented in permanent collections worldwide, including the Museum of Modern Art, New York, NY; Storm King Art Center, New Windsor, NY; the Guggenheim Museum, New York; The Los Angeles County Museum of Art, the Smithsonian Hirshhorn Museum and Sculpture Garden, Washington D.C., the Museum of Fine Arts, Boston; the Israel Museum, Jerusalem; the French National Arts Council Collection; the Hessel Museum of Art, Annandale-on-Hudson, NY; the Berkeley Art Museum, the University of California at Berkeley, California; the de Young Museum, Fine Arts Museums of San Francisco; the Museum of Contemporary Art of Haute-Vienne – Rochechouart, France; the Yokohama Museum of Art, Japan; and the Museo Jumex, Mexico City, among others.

== Curatorial ==
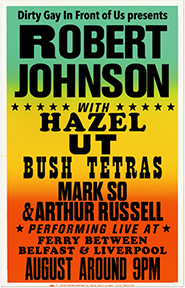
Peter Coffin, Untitled (Imaginary Concert), 2012. with Eileen Myles

Peter Coffin's practice includes curated projects and exhibitions: ÉTATS (faites-le vous-même) / Grow Your Own, at the Palais de Tokyo in Paris (2007), which subsequently traveled to Museo de Arte Contemporáneo de Castilla y León, Spain; Koldo Mitxelena Kulturunea, San Sebastián, Spain; and Centro Andaluz de Arte Contemporaneo, Seville, Spain, Deaf, at the Frank Elbaz Gallery in Paris (2007), Color Wheel at Deitch Projects in NY (2008), Imaginary Concerts V1 and V2, Untitled (Shepard Risset Glissando with Color), at the Getty Museum Auditorium, Los Angeles (2013).

Coffin published a Music for Plants compilation album with contributions from Arto Lindsay, Sun Burned Hand of the Man, Ariel Pink, Jutta Koether, Alan Licht & Tom Verlaine, David Grubbs, LoVid, Anthony Burdin, Liam Gillick, Z's Christian Marclay, and No Neck Blues Band, among others. Two subsequent volumes were compiled for future publishing. Coffin has also published Gallery Soundtracks and Music Interpreted by the Brain. Recent projects include the curatorial platform SMMoCA (Sugarmill Museum of Contemporary Art) and Another Alphabet.
