= Collins Block =

- Collins Block – Aspen Lumber and Supply
- U.S. National Register of Historic Places
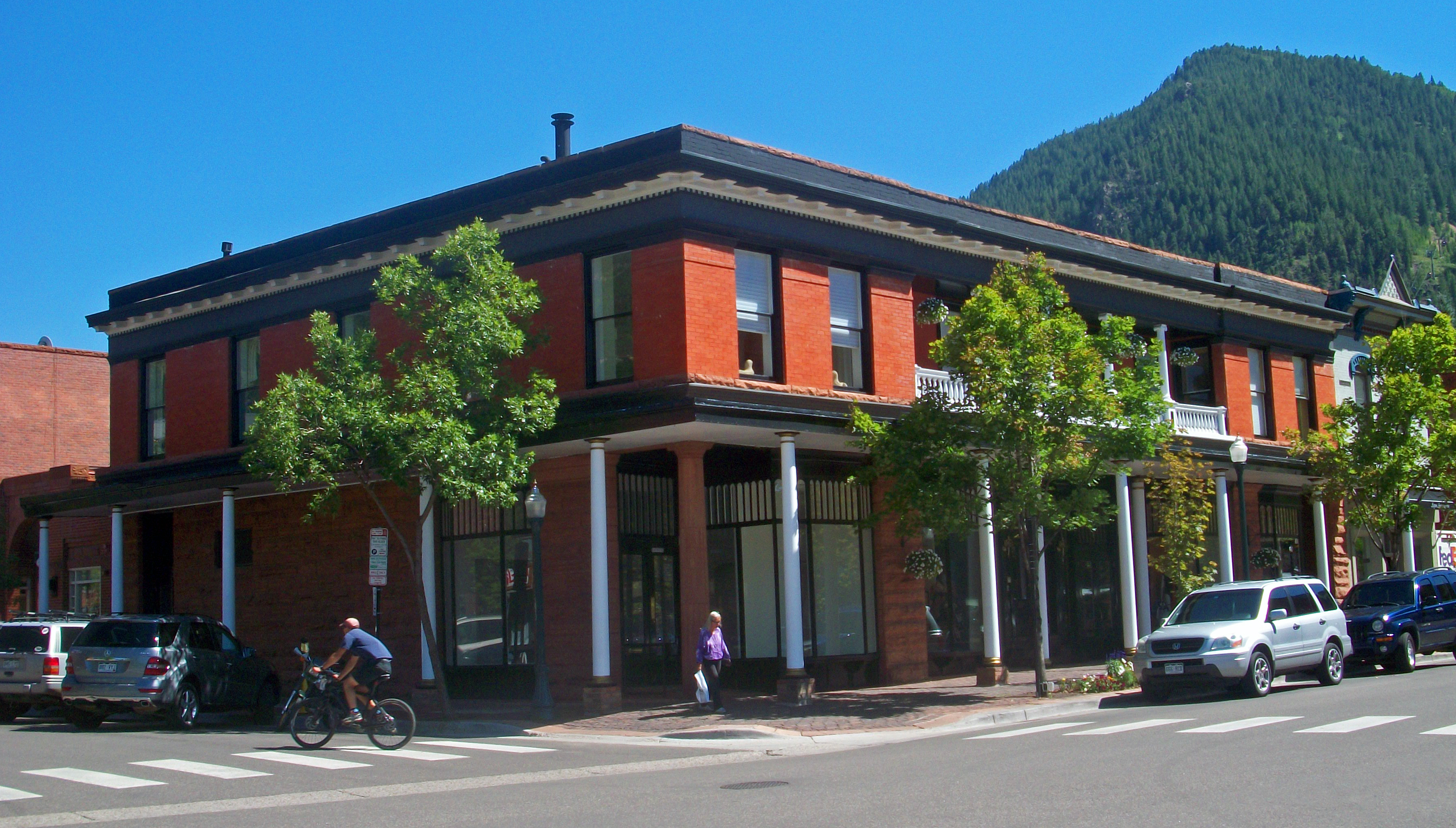
- North and west elevations, 2010

- Location within Colorado Location within the United States
- Location: 204 S. Mill St., Aspen, Colorado
- Coordinates: 39°11′22″N 106°49′9″W
- Built: 1891–93
- Architectural style: Victorian, Neoclassical
- MPS: Aspen MRA
- NRHP reference No.: 87000191
- Added to NRHP: March 6, 1987

The Collins Block is a historic commercial building located at 204 South Mill Street in Aspen, Colorado. It is a brick and stone structure erected in the early 1890s.

It was the last major construction project in the city before the silver-mining industry, mainstay of Aspen's economy, collapsed following the repeal of the Sherman Silver Purchase Act. The classically inspired decorative touches, such as a colonnade-supported roof over the sidewalk and an elaborate cornice, are the only ones on a commercial building in the city. They anticipate the wider embrace of the Classical Revival style in other cities that began a few years later.

For much of its existence it housed a lumber supply store. Local developer Harley Baldwin, owner of the neighboring Brand Building, bought it in 1988. After renovations, he began leasing space within the buildings to upscale retailers, earning the two the combined nickname of "Gucci Gulch". The Caribou Club, a members-only restaurant and Aspen institution, is located in the basement.

== Building ==
The building is located on the southeast corner of the intersection of East Hopkins Avenue and South Mill Street. Other commercial structures, historic and modern, fill the built-out blocks. To the immediate east is the Brand Building, with Aspen City Hall on the opposite far corner. Both are listed on the Register. At the south end of the opposite block of Mill is another listed building, the Wheeler Opera House, opposite a pedestrian mall.

Like most of its neighbors (except the Wheeler), the Collins Block is two stories high. The north frontage, along East Hopkins, is five bays long with the western facade seven. Rusticated sandstone, interrupted by several storefronts and a recessed corner entrance with column, faces the first floor on both sides. A flat wooden roof extends out to cover the sidewalk on both sides, supported by smooth round wooden Tuscan columns.

The second story is faced in brick. On the north face fenestration is one-over-one double-hung sash windows. Its middle three bays have a recessed porch with Ionic columns and a wooden balustrade. At the roofline is a lightly dentilled cornice with broad overhanging eaves. The roof itself is flat.

Inside, the ground level consists of storefronts and offices. The upstairs level is a residence. In the basement is the Caribou Club.

=== Caribou Club ===
Entrance to the Caribou Club is via an unmarked mahogany door with brass trim. It opens into a paneled entry area with 19th-century Western landscape paintings. On the east is the entrance to the Great Room, similarly paneled in wood and British racing green. It is decorated with more landscapes, by Frederic Remington and Albert Bierstadt, among others. Its dominant piece of furniture is a 10-foot (3 m) sofa with an equally long ottoman.

The main corridor leads around the Great Room past bathrooms, the wine cellar and two private rooms to the bar, also accessible from the Great Room. The room has many personal pictures from members on its wall. The bar itself is mahogany with a brass rail along the floor.

In the southeast corner is the dining room. It is finished in a shade described as "somewhere between Etruscan red and a ripe tomato." Light is furnished by candles and antler chandeliers. There are six round tables for diners.

== History ==
Samuel Collins began construction of the building in 1891, when the city was at the peak of its population and prosperity due to the Colorado Silver Boom. It was designed to have businesses on the first floor and offices on the second. Collins had problems with the carpenters' union that delayed completion of the project for two years. That delay may have accounted for the disparity between the more Victorian look of the stone lower story and the neoclassical elements of the upper story. The latter may have been inspired by the influential use of neoclassical design at the Chicago World's Fair of 1893.

Later that year, Congress repealed the Sherman Silver Purchase Act, which had required the federal government regularly purchase the metal to back the dollar in addition to gold. Aspen, which had grown so rich so rapidly from those sales of its silver, suffered severely as the market collapsed and many of its miners left for the gold fields of Cripple Creek. The Collins survived into the city's ensuing "quiet years" of steady population decline, when vacancy and disuse felled many of the other relics of that era.

In the 1930s, a time when Aspen was down to less than a thousand people, the Collins housed a mortuary. A couple named Tom and Alice Rachel Sardy bought it in 1938 and moved in. They also became proprietors of another business in the building, Aspen Supply, which sold furniture and hardware.

The mortuary was successful enough that the Sardy family was able to move out and build a house on Main Street across from Paepcke Park which is still known as the Sardy House. They bought a lumber business across the street, moved the mortuary to their house and combined the two businesses into Aspen Lumber & Supply, using almost the whole Collins Block. After World War II, Aspen began to develop into the ski resort town it is today. The Sardys sold part of both their family businesses to Walter Paepcke, the Chicago businessman who guided much of that era of the city's development. In the late 1940s, Tom Sardy recognized that Aspen would need a modern airport, and after being elected a Pitkin County commissioner worked to get one built. Sardy Field at Aspen-Pitkin County Airport is named in his honor.

In 1988 the Collins was acquired by Aspen developer and businessman Harley Baldwin, who already owned the neighboring Brand Building. Returning to Aspen after 16 years of activity in New York, he undertook extensive renovations to the structure. The upper floor he returned to residential use, building for himself and his partner, Richard Edwards, a 6,000-square-foot (560 m^{2}) penthouse that was later featured in Architectural Digest.

On the ground level he eased out the remnants of the hardware store and other, similar retail tenants. In their place came upscale fashion boutiques such as Bulgari and Brioni, complementing the Louis Vuitton, Gucci and Dior presence at the other end of the block. These entrants into the local marketplace, into a city that had not previously shown the effect of its growing population of rich and famous residents, earned the two buildings the nickname "Glitter Gulch", which eventually became applied to Aspen as a whole.

In the basement of the Collins, Baldwin built the Caribou Club. Admission was limited to members only, the first time such an establishment had opened in Aspen, where celebrities and locals had previously mixed at the Hotel Jerome's bar. Baldwin was criticized for this, but the Caribou became one of the city's most popular nightspots. Diana Ross and Tom Ford, as well as businesspeople like Warren Lichtenstein and Lynda Resnick, are among the regulars.

In 1987, it was listed on the National Register of Historic Places along with many other historic properties in the city.

== See also ==
- National Register of Historic Places listings in Pitkin County, Colorado
