= Ruedi Reservoir =

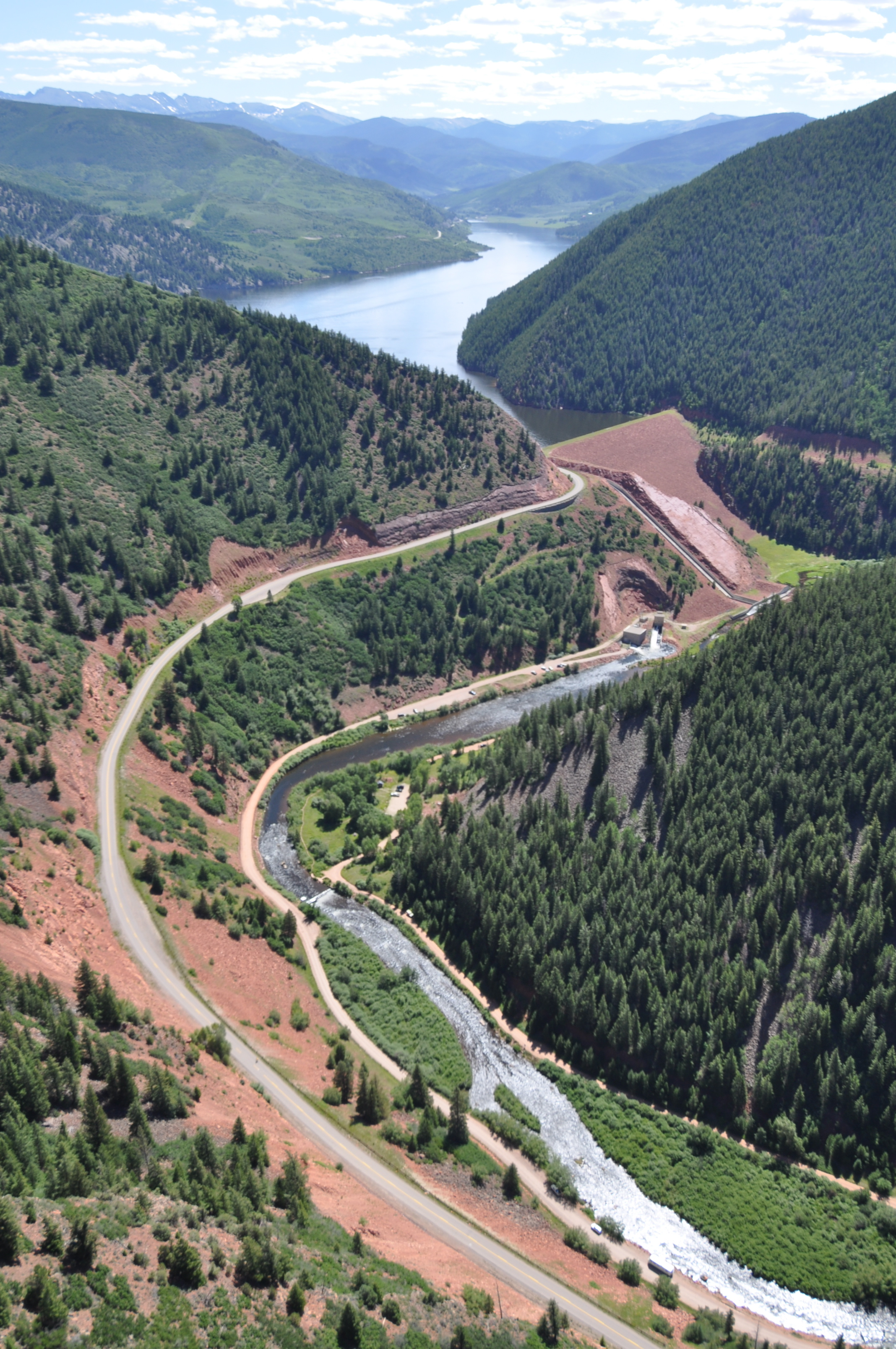
- Looking eastward, upstream, on the Fryingpan River to Ruedi Dam and Reservoir

- Location in Colorado
- Location: Pitkin and Eagle counties
- Coordinates: 39°21′47″N 106°47′05″W
- Type: reservoir
- Part of: Colorado River Basin
- Primary inflows: Fryingpan River
- Primary outflows: Fryingpan River
- Managing agency: United States Bureau of Reclamation
- Built: 1968
- Surface area: 997 acres (403 ha)
- Water volume: 101,280 acre⋅ft (124,930,000 m^{3})
- Surface elevation: 2,369 m (7,772 ft)

Ruedi Reservoir is a reservoir on the Western Slope of the Continental Divide on the Fryingpan River. It sits about 15 miles (24 km) upstream of the town of Basalt, Colorado, near Aspen. The reservoir is located within the White River National Forest, and straddles the county line between Pitkin County and Eagle County.

The reservoir and the Ruedi Dam were built from 1964 to 1968 and are both owned and operated by the United States Bureau of Reclamation. One purpose of the reservoir is to help compensate for diversions to Colorado's East Slope, taken further up in the Fryingpan Basin as part of Reclamation's federal Fryingpan-Arkansas Project. Another purpose of the reservoir is to provide water for West Slope interests. The dam is located in Eagle County.

Ruedi stores approximately 102,000 acre-feet (126,000,000 m^{3}) of water. Water in the reservoir is released through Ruedi Dam down the Fryingpan primarily for municipal, industrial, and agricultural interests. A side benefit of the reservoir is recreation. Boating, fishing and camping are popular at the reservoir itself, while the downstream portion of the Fryingpan River has become well regarded as a Gold Medal fishery.

Typically, releases from Ruedi follow a seasonal pattern. The USGS page for streamflow below Ruedi Dam provides up-to-date information for water released to the Lower Fryingpan in cubic-feet-per-second measurements.

== Hydroelectric power plant ==
A hydroelectric power plant that sits at the base of the dam produces 5.0 megawatts of electricity. Built in 1985, the plant supplies electricity to the City of Aspen and is owned by the city.

== See also ==
- List of largest reservoirs of Colorado
