= Shara Hughes =

American artist (born 1981)

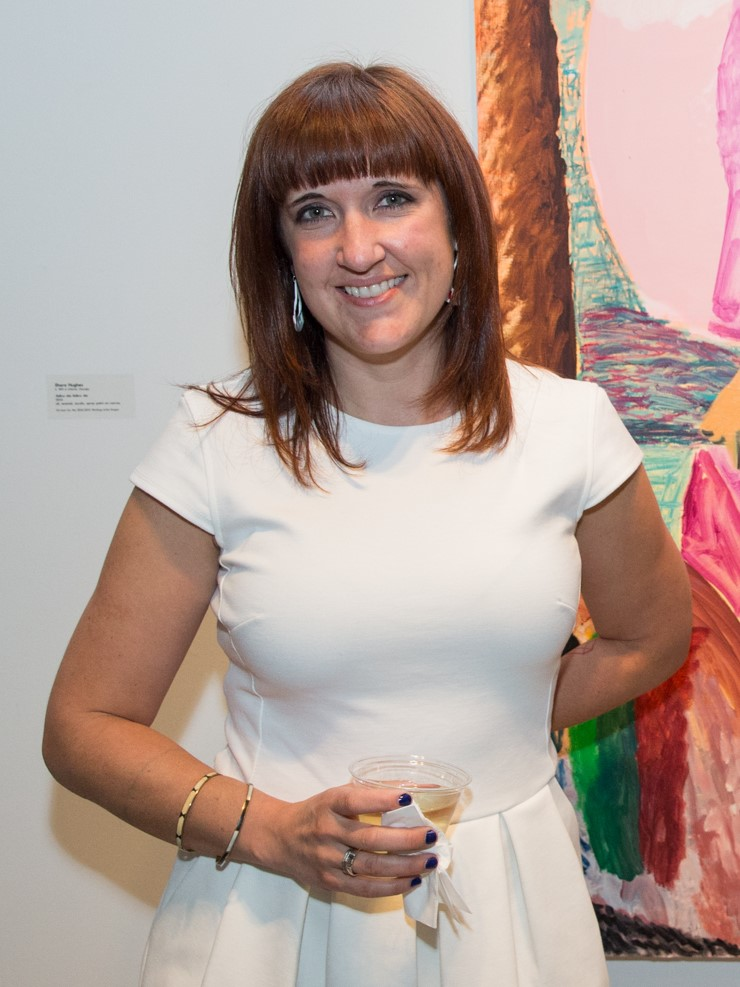
- Born: 1981; Atlanta, Georgia, US
- Education: Rhode Island School of Design, Skowhegan School of Painting and Sculpture
- Known for: Painting

Shara Hughes (born 1981) is an American painter. She lives and works in Brooklyn.

== Biography ==
Hughes was born in 1981 in Atlanta, Georgia. She attended the Rhode Island School of Design (RISD) in 2004 and went on to study at the Skowhegan School of Painting and Sculpture.

== Exhibitions and collections ==
In 2017 an entire room of Hughes' work was in the 2017 Whitney Biennial. Hughes had a solo exhibit at Switzerland’s Kunstmuseum Luzern in the fall of 2022. From Oct 9, 2026 to Feb 28, 2027, the Albertina Museum Vienna hosted the solo exhibition Sink in with several rooms of Hughes' paintings and ceramics.

Her work is included in the collections of the Whitney Museum of American Art, the Metropolitan Museum of Art and the Museum of Contemporary Art, Georgia as well as the Denver Art Museum, and the Smithsonian American Art Museum.
