= Delia Brown =

American painter

- Born: 1969 (age 56–57)
- Education: University of California, Los Angeles, University of California, Santa Cruz
- Known for: Painting
- Movement: The Fuzz

Delia Brown (born 1969) is a Los Angeles–based artist originally from California. She is one of several artists who gained notice at a moment when much attention was being paid to the graduates of Los Angeles-area MFA programs.

== Life and work ==
Brown graduated from UCLA in 2000 with an MFA and UC Santa Cruz in 1992 with a BA in studio art.

Best known for painted scenes that include her friends cavorting in places of specific privilege (such as art collectors' homes), Brown gained notoriety in October 2000 when The New York Times Magazine ran an eight-page spread of her watercolors posing as fashion editorial. This publication coincided with her debut exhibition at D'Amelio Terras gallery in Chelsea, titled What! Are You Jealous? (featuring scenes of women drinking champagne poolside in Beverly Hills-ish backyards, with the title borrowed from a Gauguin painting of Tahitian women lounging likewise), which was attacked by Times critic Michael Kimmelman who called the buzz around her work a "pseudo-event".

Brown's work is primarily engaged in exploring desire as an individuated experience that connects the personal to the collective unconscious, often mediated through advertising and commercial culture. Referencing early bourgeois painting genres, she paints herself and friends enacting their own fantasies of being part of the leisure class, with props from snacks and beverages to million-dollar artworks functioning as important accessories in the assumption of privilege.

In interviews, Brown has often referenced her upbringing in a left-wing activist family as influential in her choice of subject matter. She has expressed discomfort about the role of the painter/artist as serving as high-status entertainment and decor for the patron class, and much of her work seems to contain a subtle grain of hostility, implying the discomfort she feels in her own complicity in this economic arrangement.

Brown's background includes several years pursuing a career as a hiphop lyricist in a two-girl group called The Fuzz (with Evelyn Charlot, a.k.a. Evenflo), as well as studies in the Stanislavsky Method of acting. These experiences inform Brown's practice in various ways including her use of role-playing and dress-up for her paintings, and occasional forays into performance and video.

Brown has worked with actress Hollis Witherspoon in developing a fictional artist character called Chelsey Green, whose paintings and performances Brown devises and then hands off to Witherspoon the job of playing "author" to the projects. To date, Witherspoon-as-Green has been seen in a painting and video exhibition at the Margo Leavin Gallery in Los Angeles (2006) titled Step-and-Repeats and Double Self-Portraits.

Witherspoon also plays a character in Brown's on-going project titled Felicity and Caprice, a narrative series of paintings and drawings which draw upon Claude Chabrol's camp masterpiece of 1960s French cinema, Les Biches. A series of drawings on this theme was exhibited at D'Amelio Terras in 2007 and received praise from critics. Writing in The New York Times, Martha Schwendener says "Ms. Brown has taken hold of a cache of references, from commercial illustration to French erotic cinema, and spun it into a deadpan, streamlined narrative about women, friendship and patronage".

Brown is the recipient of the 2019 Richard Diebenkorn Teaching Fellowship at the San Francisco Art Institute. In her recent work, Brown has stopped using photographs as a source material in favor of a heavy stylization influenced by Futurism and Cubism. These new paintings were exhibited in her 2018 solo exhibition Demoiselles d’Avignon at Tibor de Nagy in New York.
