= Lake Fork (Arkansas River tributary) =

Lake Fork Lake Fork Creek
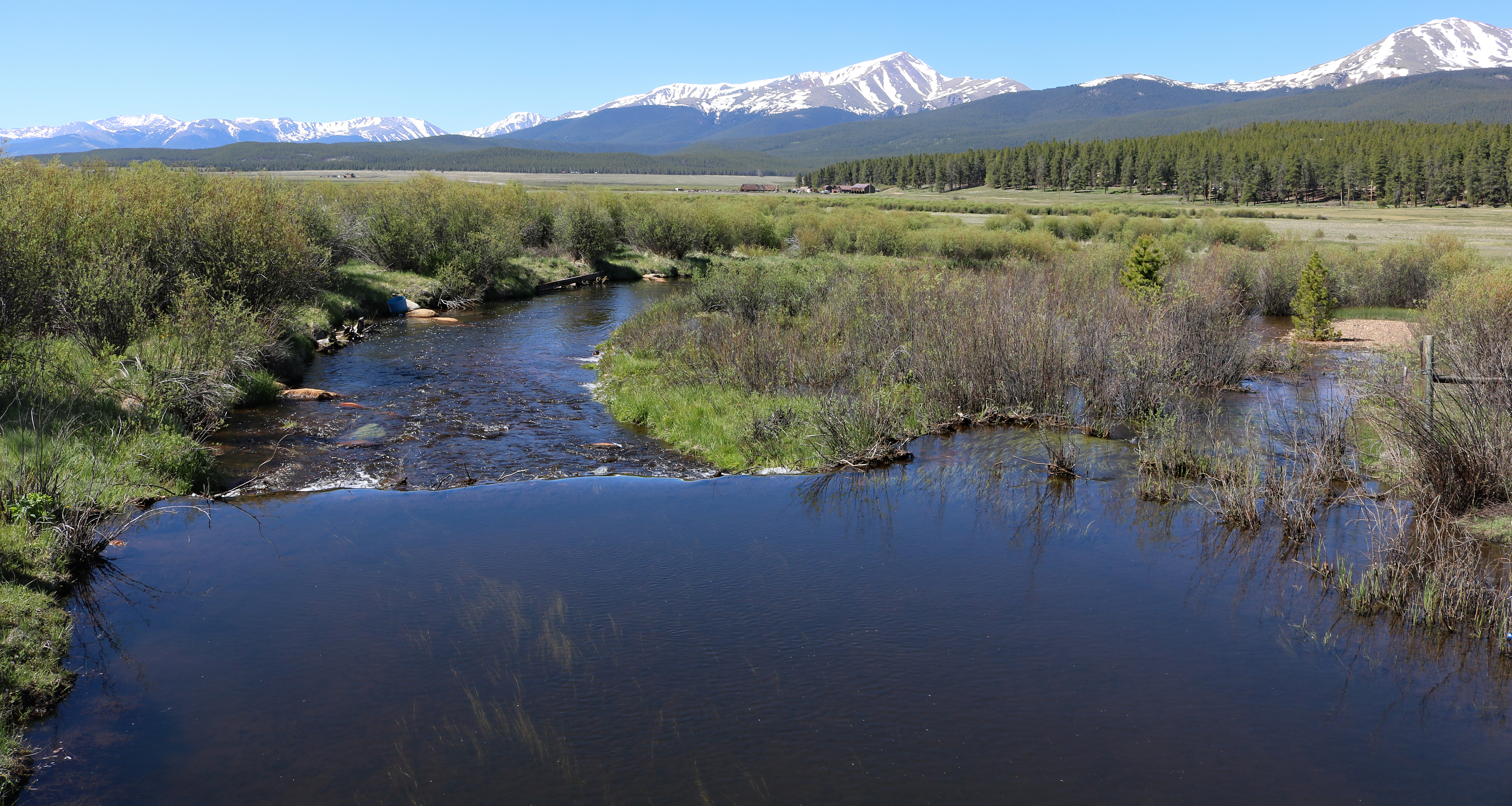
- Looking south from a bridge on Colorado State Highway 300

- The river's location in Colorado

Location
- Country: United States
- State: Colorado

Physical characteristics
- Source: Northern Sawatch Range
  - location: Lake County, Colorado, U.S.
  - coordinates: 39°18′17.96″N 106°25′52.10″W
  - elevation: 3,520 meters (11,550 feet)
- Mouth
  - location: Arkansas River in central Lake County
  - coordinates: 39°12′6.96″N 106°21′15.09″W
  - elevation: 9,446 feet (2,879 meters)

Basin features
- Progression: Arkansas—Mississippi
- Landmarks: Timberline Lake, Turquoise Lake, Colorado State Highway 300

Lake Fork is a tributary of the Arkansas River in Lake County, Colorado. The river rises in the Holy Cross Wilderness north of Mount Massive in the Northern Sawatch Range of Colorado. It flows through Timberline Lake and then through Turquoise Lake west of Leadville. The river then flows south and joins the Arkansas River southwest of Leadville and west of U.S. Highway 24.

== See also ==
- List of rivers of Colorado
