= Dirk Westphal =

American artist

Dirk Reinhard Westphal (born 1963 in Columbus, Ohio) is an American artist living in New York City.

== Work ==
Since completing his MFA at California Institute of the Arts in 1989 he has been working in several different artistic processes, but with an emphasis in photography. Initially working commercially as a freelance photographer for magazines and newspaper, now he works solely in the studio. Presently, he does virtually no commercial work leaving the distribution of his work up to the several galleries he works with, namely Mixed Greens in NYC, Baldwin Gallery in Aspen, Co., the Cat Street Galleries in Hong Kong, and Tim Olsen in Sydney, Australia.

Although his work does not always look the same, the common threads would be mutation, artificial colors, and interpretations or perceptions of beauty. He hopes to somehow communicate his position on his favorite topics back to the viewer/consumer of his work, in order to spur a larger dialogue, not just with him and his own work, but outwardly in a broader way.

His photos have been published widely, the most obvious being in The New York Times, Der Spiegel and People Magazine. His work has been reviewed in Art in America and ArtForum.com amongst many other publications. His work is also held in several private and public collections.

Westphal married Elizabeth Anne Lewis in 2002.
