= Alexander Gorlizki =

British painter (born 1967)

Alexander Gorlizki (born London, 1967) is a British-born contemporary artist and resident of New York. He studied at Bristol Polytechnic, followed in 1992 by an M.F.A. in sculpture from the Slade School, London. He is known for interest in Asian arts including his collaboration with Riyaz Uddin, an Indian miniature painter from Jaipur. Besides private collections his works can be found in the following public collections (among others): Aspen Art Museum, Aspen (USA) Museum Kunst Palast, Düsseldorf (D) Royal Ontario Museum, Toronto (CA) Victoria & Albert Museum, London (GB) Denver Art Museum, Denver (USA) Collection Antoine de Galbert, Paris, (F) Artothèque Limousin, Limoges (F), Museum de Buitenplaats, Eelde (NL),
