= Aspen City Hall =

- Armory Hall, Fraternal Hall
- U.S. National Register of Historic Places
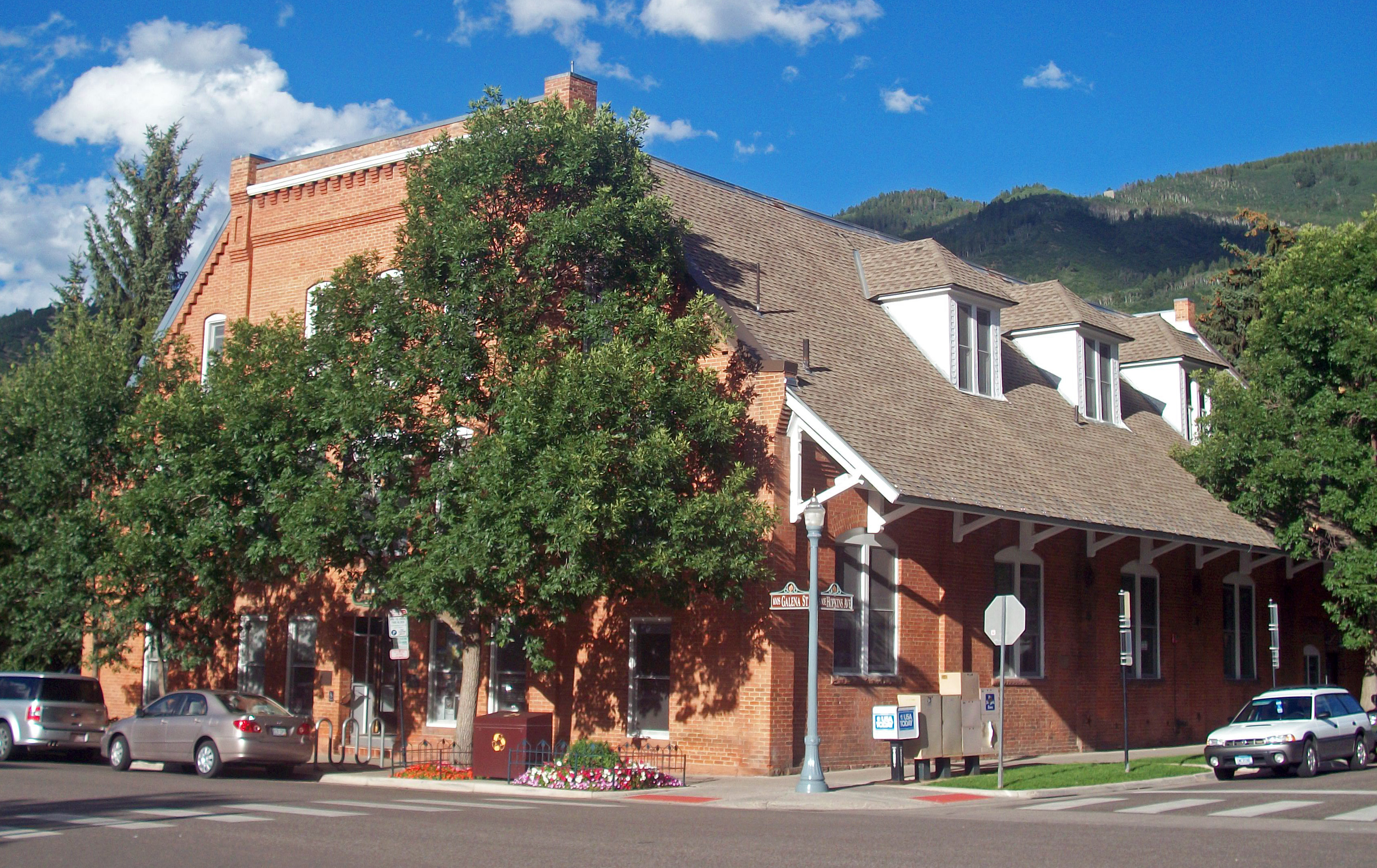
- West elevation and south profile, 2010

- Location within Colorado
- Location: Aspen, CO
- Coordinates: 39°11′22″N 106°49′6″W
- Area: 9,000 square feet (840 m^{2})
- Built: 1892
- NRHP reference No.: 75000529
- Added to NRHP: June 5, 1975

Aspen City Hall, known in the past as Armory Hall, Fraternal Hall, is located at the intersection of South Galena Street and East Hopkins Avenue in Aspen, Colorado, United States. It is a brick building dating to the 1890s. In 1975 it was listed on the National Register of Historic Places.

It was built to serve both as headquarters for the local militia and as a community gathering place. It served a variety of community-related functions, eventually becoming city hall in the mid-20th century. Later in the century, as the city grew again into an affluent resort community, it had to move some of its departments to other office space and renovate the city hall extensively, particularly inside.

== Building ==
The building is located on the northeast corner of the intersection, opposite the Hyman–Brand Building, also listed on the Register. The intersection is one block south of Main Street (State Highway 82) and another listed property, the Pitkin County Courthouse. The terrain is level and the surrounding neighborhood heavily developed and urban, with mostly commercial buildings of one or two stories. They are an even mix of buildings from the same era as the armory and sympathetic contemporary structures, mostly of brick. An unnamed alley to the north allows passage through the middle of the block to South Hunter Street. Tall mature trees screen the building from the streets and alley.

The building itself is a two-and-a-half-story rectangular 91-by-66-foot (28 by 20 m) four-by-five-bay structure of red brick in common bond on a stone foundation. The 14-inch-thick (360 mm) walls have multiple layers of brick and load-bearing piers. It is topped by a shingled gambrel roof, with three symmetrically-spaced hipped gables on the south pitch and two asymmetrical ones on the north. The top pitches are very shallow, sloped only as much as necessary to let water run off and hidden from view by a parapet with stepped brickwork. It slopes down to broad overhanging bracketed eaves on the south side and close ones on the north.

On the west (front) facade, fenestration consists of one-over-one double-hung sash windows on the first story, with the centrally located main entrance recessed. The stories above have slight segmental arched windows. Brick pilasters, echoed by similar quoins at the corners, rise to the roofline, where corbels support a cornice below a parapet along the flat section. On the north and south sides are four double segmental arch windows, similar to those on the upper stories, separated by brick pilasters. The interior has been extensively renovated since construction.

== History ==
The building was constructed in three months in 1892, near the end of the Colorado Silver Boom, at a cost of $15,000 ($537,000 in contemporary dollars). At that time Aspen was a fast-growing mining town that had not existed 15 years earlier. It was intended to be both a staging area for the local militia and a community meeting place. Hence its original names of Armory Hall and Fraternal Hall.

As Aspen's population dwindled after the boom in the early decades of the 20th century, it continued to serve various community-related functions such as dances and concerts, and was at one point a roller rink. These helped it escape the neglect and demolition which plagued many other buildings from the boom era. In 1956 it became city hall, following the demolition of the old building on Durant Avenue, and has served that function ever since.

At some point before 1975 three of the five bays on the south side were filled in. In the early 1990s the interior was extensively renovated to serve the needs of a modern city, once again having grown as a result of its popularity as a ski resort and upscale mountain residence. Within another decade the city had outgrown the space, and had to establish satellite offices around the city. A $100,000 grant from the Colorado State Historical Foundation paid for repairs to the roof and brickwork. In 2008 the city spent over half a million dollars to remodel the interior. It added new electronics and furniture in the council chambers, and renovating the offices of five departments that stayed in the building while others moved to newer space.

== See also ==
- National Register of Historic Places listings in Pitkin County, Colorado
