= Fryingpan River =

River in Colorado, US

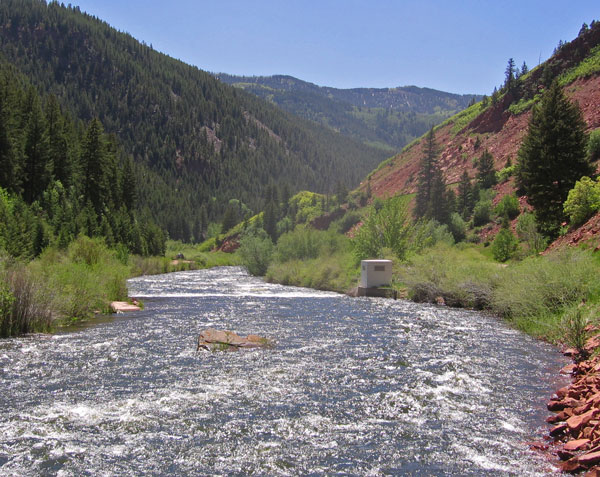
- Fryingpan River below Ruedi Dam

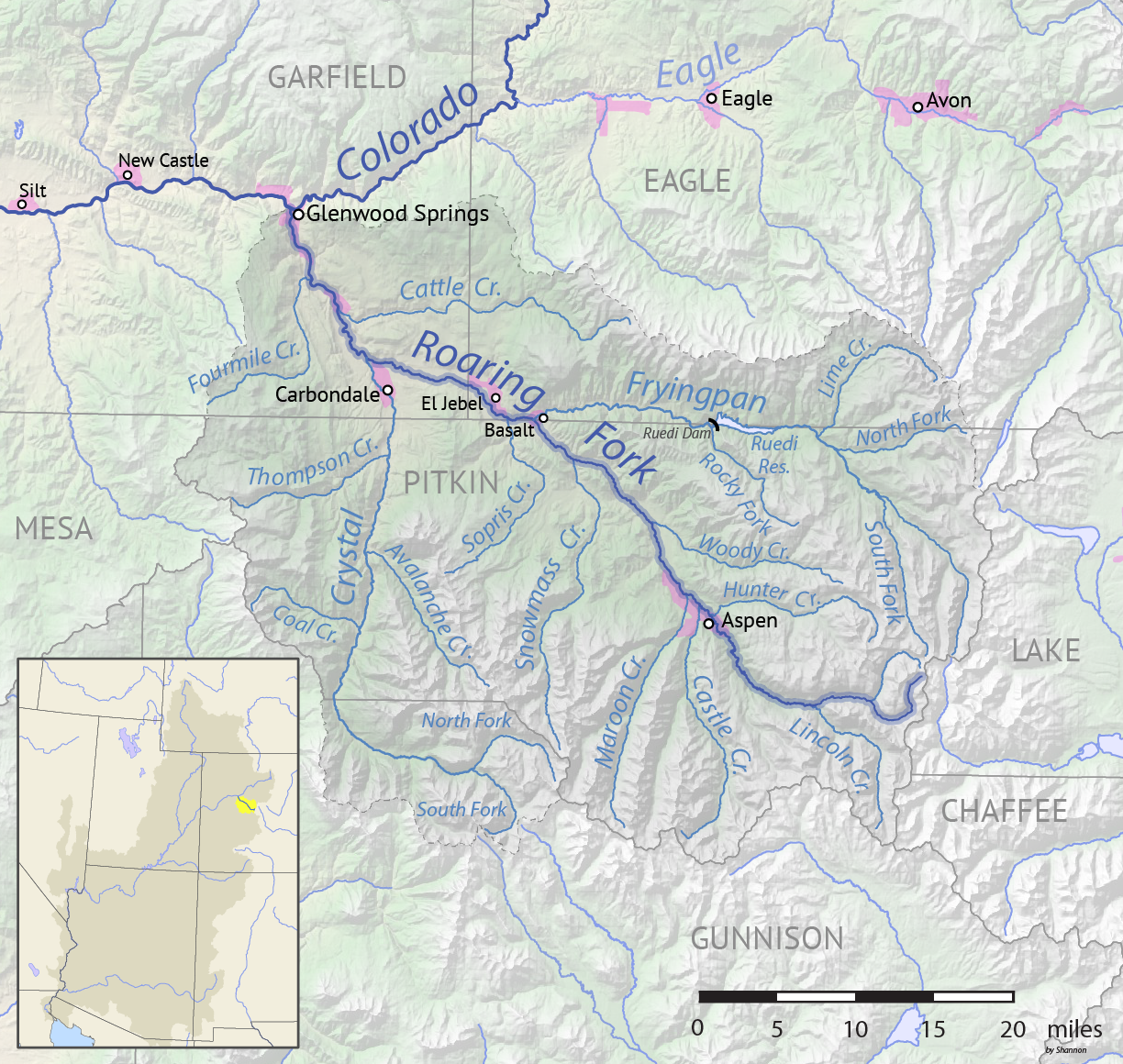
- Map of Roaring Fork drainage basin, including the Fryingpan River

Location
- Country: United States
- State: Colorado
- Counties: Eagle and Pitkin

Physical characteristics
- Source: Near Mount Massive
  - location: Hunter-Fryingpan Wilderness, Pitkin County
  - coordinates: 39°09′52″N 106°31′40″W
  - elevation: 12,083 ft (3,683 m)
- Mouth: Roaring Fork River
  - location: Basalt, Eagle County
  - coordinates: 39°22′00″N 107°02′03″W
  - elevation: 6,591 ft (2,009 m)
- Length: 42 mi (68 km)
- Basin size: 237 sq mi (610 km^{2})
- Discharge
  - location: Near Ruedi
  - average: 176 cu ft/s (5.0 m^{3}/s)
  - minimum: 28 cu ft/s (0.79 m^{3}/s)
  - maximum: 2,690 cu ft/s (76 m^{3}/s)

Basin features
- Tributaries
  - left: Marten Creek, South Fork Fryingpan River, Rocky Fork Creek
  - right: Ivanhoe Creek, North Fork Fryingpan River, Lime Creek

The Fryingpan River is a tributary of the Roaring Fork River, approximately 42 miles (68 km) long, in Eagle and Pitkin counties in Colorado, United States.

== History ==
The name originated when all but two of a group of trappers were killed by Utes; one survivor was injured and stayed in a cave while the other went to summon help after hanging a frying pan in a tree so he could find the cave again.

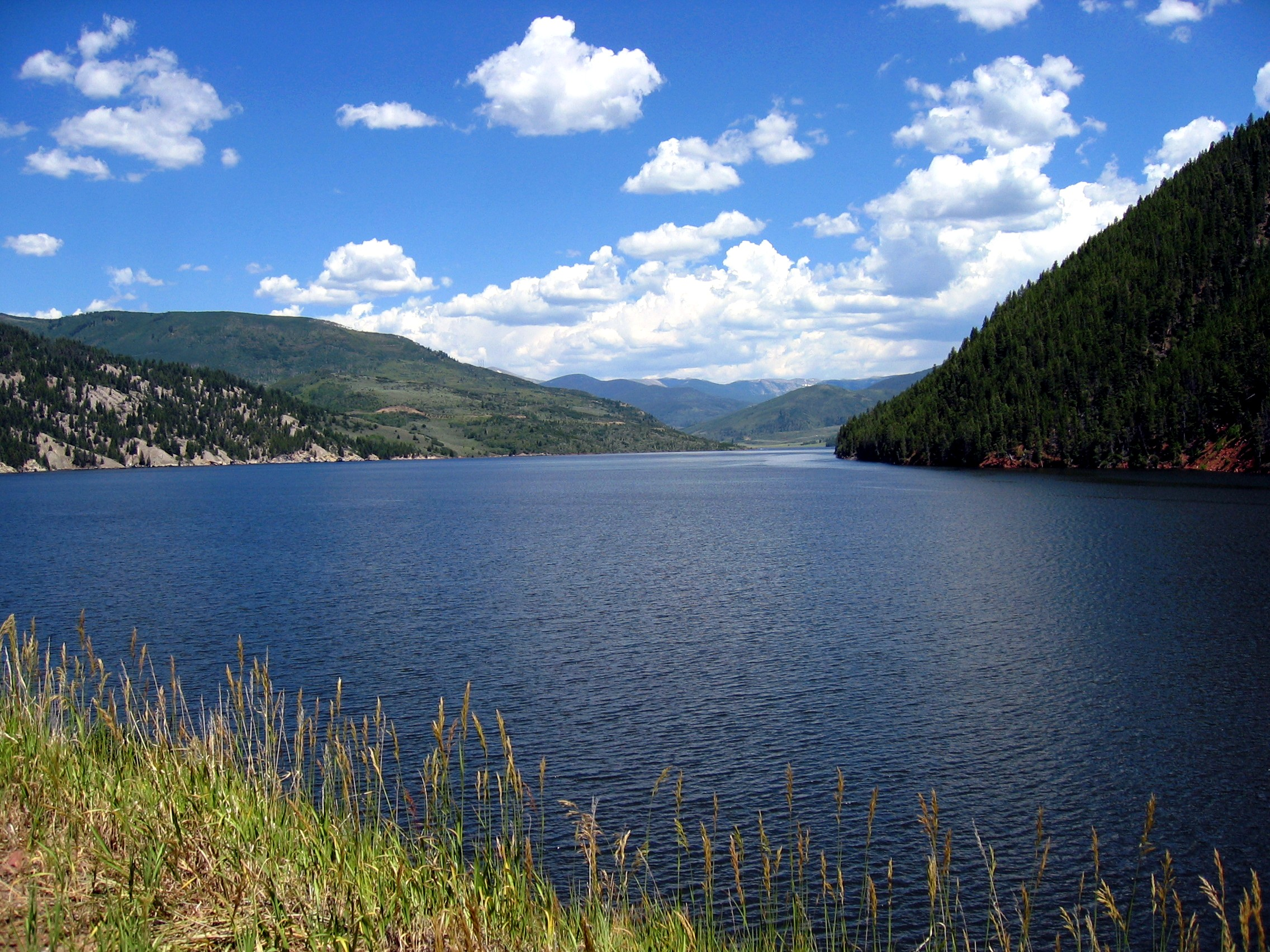
Ruedi Reservoir on the Fryingpan River

== Geography ==
It rises in northeastern Pitkin County, in the White River National Forest in the Sawatch Mountains along the western side of the continental divide. It flows westward along the county line between Pitkin and Eagle County. Below Meredith, it is dammed to form the Ruedi Reservoir. It joins the Roaring Fork below Basalt. A portion of the river's water is diverted to the east side of the continental divide for irrigation and drinking water via the Fryingpan-Arkansas Project.

== See also ==
- List of rivers of Colorado
- List of tributaries of the Colorado River
