= Brand Building =

Historic building in downtown Aspen, Colorado, US

- Hyman–Brand Building
- U.S. National Register of Historic Places
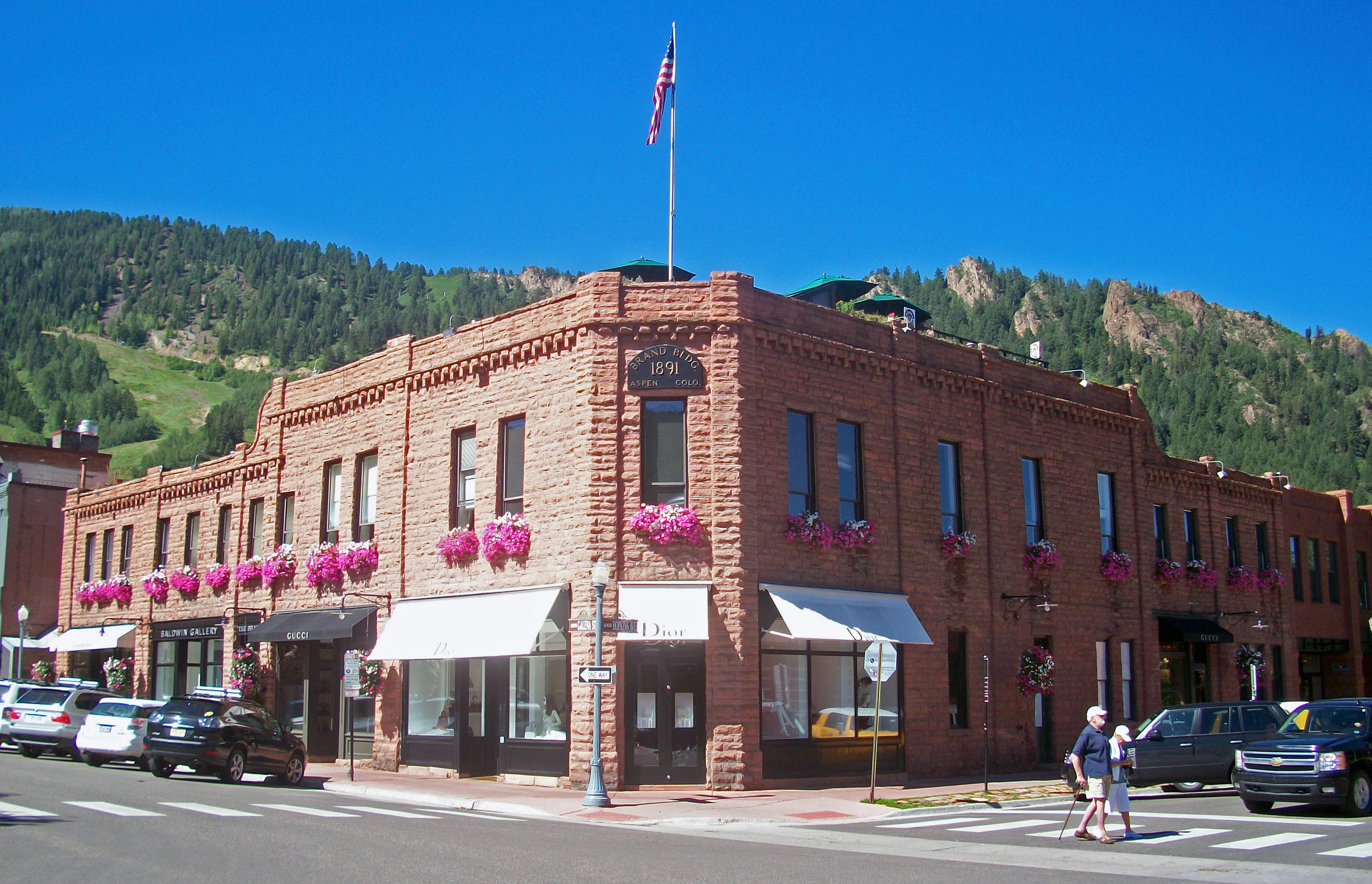
- East and north elevations, 2010

- Location within Colorado
- Location: Aspen, CO
- Coordinates: 39°11′22″N 106°49′7″W
- Built: 1891
- NRHP reference No.: 85000085
- Added to NRHP: January 18, 1985

The Hyman–Brand Building, often referred to as just the Brand Building, is located at the corner of South Galena Street and East Hopkins Avenue in Aspen, Colorado, United States. It is a two-story stone building erected in the late 19th century. At different stages in the city's history, it was owned by an entrepreneur who used the building in a way that redefined the city for that time. In 1985, it was listed on the National Register of Historic Places.

It was built by David Marks Hyman, one of the earliest investors in silver mining during Aspen's early years; it is the only building in Aspen he is known to have financed. Originally home to a bank, it was one of the largest commercial blocks built during the city's boomtown period. Later it was used for several car-related businesses, including a dealership and drive-through gas station in the corner where the bank lobby had once been. In 1971 local entrepreneur Harley Baldwin saved it from demolition, and along with the neighboring Collins Block later renovated it into an area now known as "Glitter Gulch". Today it is home to some upscale boutiques and art galleries.

== Building ==
The building is located at the southwest corner of the intersection, on the opposite corner from Aspen City Hall, also listed on the National Register. To the west along East Hopkins is another Register-listed property, the Collins Block. The neighborhood is urban and densely developed, with a mixture of historic and sympathetic modern two- and three-story commercial buildings predominating.

Structurally it has brick walls, faced in heavily rusticated peachblow sandstone. It is two stories in height. A single-bay clipped corner entrance divides two street facades, 12 bays on the Galena frontage and 10 on Hopkins.

Two full-height pilasters separate the corner bay and the two-bay portions on either side. Along Hopkins the next section is a single bay, then two each in the next three sections and another pilaster at the corner. The Galena facade has three in the next section, above the Gucci boutique. A narrow single bay is followed by two three-bay sections with the same treatment.

Most of the street level is devoted to retail storefronts, their entrances covered in awnings. A Dior boutique occupies the corner space, with Gucci on either side. An art gallery occupies the space to the south of Gucci along Galena.

Fenestration on the upper story consists of one-over-one double-hung sash windows. The five on the Hopkins side, and the first four on Galena, are taller and have taller upper panes. The corner window is topped with a semicircular plaque with "BRAND BLDG. 1891 ASPEN COLO." lettered on it. Above the second story, is a double modillioned cornice in three courses, higher in the middle where the roof has a parapet. Behind it is an open-air rooftop cafe, with umbrellas over the tables. A flagpole stands above the corner.

The interior of the building is given over to the stores on the first floor with hotel rooms on the second, many of which retain some of the original woodwork. Inside the Dior boutique the bank vault and door from the bank originally in that space remain. The door has its original artistic decoration.

== History ==
David Marks Hyman, a Bavarian-born Harvard-educated Cincinnati lawyer, came to Aspen in the early 1880s to take more direct control of silver mines friends of his had invested his money in. He became one of the richest citizens of the emerging community, building a fortune from the Colorado Silver Boom.

Like fellow early Aspen mining entrepreneur Jerome B. Wheeler, his rival and adversary in a bitter legal battle over one particularly rich silver lode, he made his statement with large buildings bearing his name. The Hyman Building was faced in the same peachblow sandstone as Wheeler's Opera House, brought to the city by the railroads that Hyman and Wheeler had briefly put aside their differences to bring up the Roaring Fork Valley in the late 1880s.

The Hyman was one of the largest commercial buildings erected in Aspen during the early mining boom. Built for $30,000 ($1,075,000 in modern dollars), it rivaled in size and prestige the Aspen Block to the south, built by D.R.C. Brown, another major early developer of the city. Both the Aspen and the Hyman shared the same major tenant: the First National Bank of Aspen. In the Hyman it occupied the corner suite. The bank was known in its time for serving lavish lunches with fine wines. Other retail tenants included jewelers and a grocery store. The upper space had some offices but was mostly given over to a meeting hall of the Patriotic Order Sons of Liberty.

The bank's presence and the building's dominant position within the city helped it survive after the repeal of the Sherman Silver Purchase Act in response to the Panic of 1893 brought an end to the boom years of early Aspen. The metal's price collapsed to market levels once the federal government was no longer required to purchase it, and the city's population steadily declined. Many smaller buildings from the boom years stood vacant and abandoned, their neglect leaving them victim to fire and the effects of Aspen's severe and lengthy high-altitude winters. The order's former meeting room was a popular venue for local dance events.

Another entrepreneur, Michael H. Brand, bought the building in the 1920s. He adapted it for use to serve the growing population of automobile users, a mode of transportation then making its presence felt in the remote mountain town, its population by then a historic low of less than a thousand. As in the Aspen Block, the corner space was converted into a service station. The onetime bank lobbies had the only ceilings high enough for trucks to fit under and shelter them from snowfall. Other spaces were given over to a dealership and repair shop.

After World War II, another owner took over the gas station. Aspen gradually became one of the first ski resorts in the Western United States, and its economy improved. The Aspen Music Festival used the meeting hall space for orchestra rehearsals in the 1950s, before it developed its own facilities outside of town. The Hyman–Brand began to feel the effects of time and its radical conversion several decades earlier. By 1970 the gas station was no longer a viable business, and the building was condemned and slated for demolition.

The following year it was saved when Harley Baldwin bought it for $170,000 ($1,351,000 in contemporary dollars). A man in his mid-20s who had driven out to Aspen from the East after college and established a business selling crêpes which he then parlayed into real estate, Baldwin restored the Hyman–Brand and leased it out as a retail space.

A few years later, Baldwin returned to New York City and devoted most of his time and energy to real estate there. In 1988 he returned to Aspen and bought the Collins Block next door. He began to transform both properties into visible symbols of Aspen's cachet among the international rich and famous, easing out longtime tenants like a hardware store in favor of upscale fashion retailers like Louis Vuitton, Dior and Gucci. Baldwin opened the art gallery that still bears his name in the building as well. The upper story of the Hyman–Brand became the exclusive Aspen Hotel, where guests had membership privileges at the exclusive Caribou Club in the basement of the Collins Block

The area became known as "Glitter Gulch", a nickname that soon also came to be used for Aspen as a whole. Some residents lamented the open acknowledgement of Aspen's association with celebrity and wealth, recalling the days of the early 1970s when the city's lack of pretense had so attracted those visitors in the first place, and they mixed freely with locals. Baldwin saw it as simply inevitable. "Aspen is for the most successful people in the world. It so happens that they like to wear Gucci. Where's the problem?" he told Vanity Fair in 2001. When he died in 2005, shortly after Louis Vuitton announced it would move to larger quarters on Mill Street, (Note: Dior now occupies its former space at the corner.) the Hyman–Brand was estimated to be worth as much as $15 million.

== See also ==
- National Register of Historic Places listings in Pitkin County, Colorado
