= Zemplén =

Zemplén may refer to:

- Zemplén County, a historical region of the Kingdom of Hungary
- the part of the historical region in present-day Hungary, now part of the Borsod-Abaúj-Zemplén county
- Géza Zemplén, Hungarian chemist
- Győző Zemplén, Hungarian physicist

== See also ==
- Borsod-Abaúj-Zemplén
- Zemplén Mountains (in Hungary)
- Zemplín (disambiguation)
