= Ukrainians in Slovakia =

Ukrainians in Slovakia Українці в Словаччині
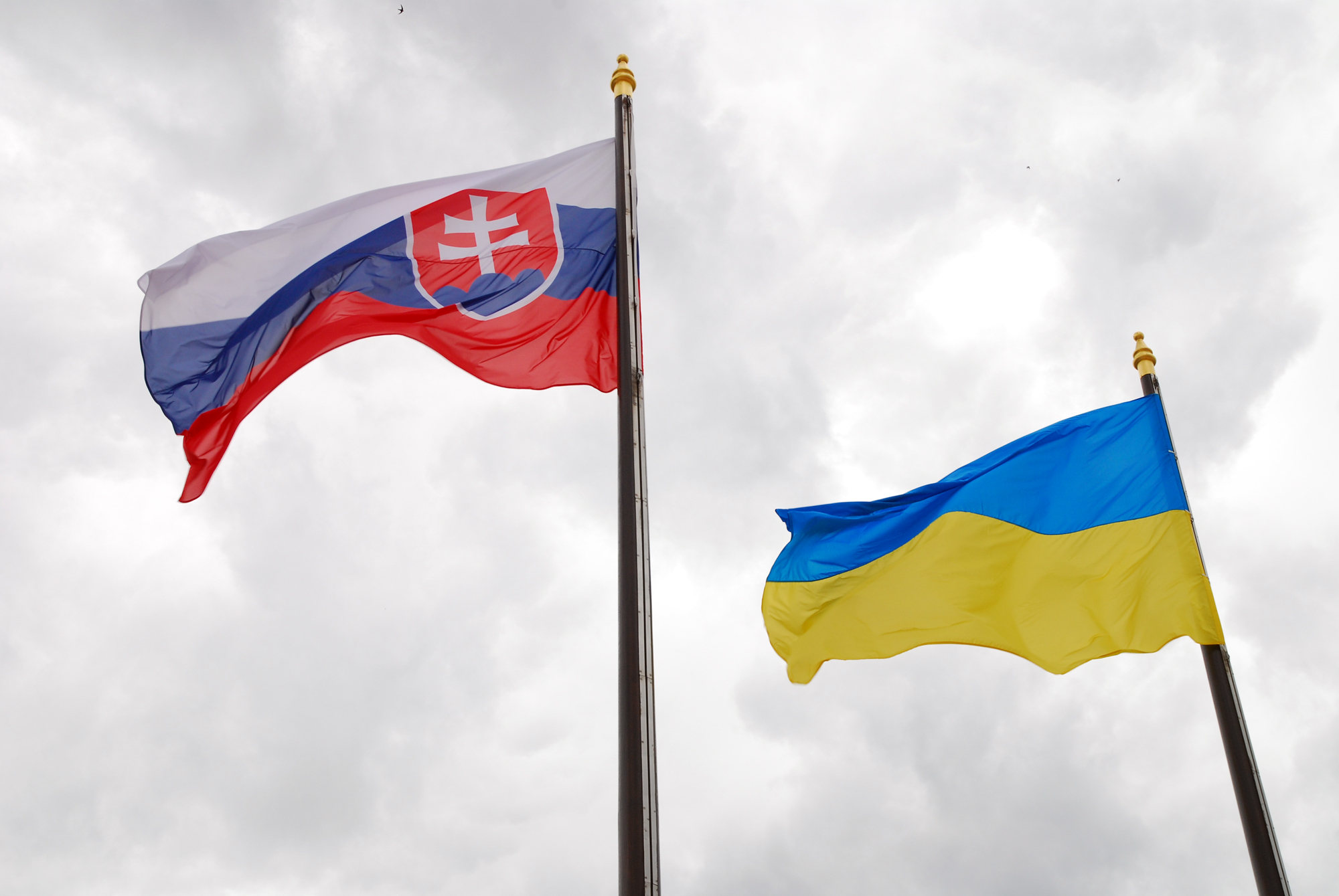

Total population
- 187,719

Regions with significant populations
- Prešov Region, Košice Region

Languages
- Slovak, Ukrainian

Religion
- Predominantly Greek Catholic with Orthodox and Jewish minorities

Related ethnic groups
- Ukrainians, Rusyns, other Slavic peoples especially East Slavs

The Ukrainians in Slovakia form a small minority in the country. Ukraine and Slovakia share a border, and eastern Slovakia has traditionally had several Ukrainian villages in the Carpathians (many of which are still there). The town of Svidník is generally regarded as the capital of the Ukrainians in Slovakia, and has a museum dedicated to Ukrainian culture. Although Ukraine shares a border with Slovakia and not the Czech Republic, the latter has far more Ukrainians (over ten times as much) than Slovakia due to an immigration boom. Still, since the beginning of the Russian invasion of Ukraine, as well during the 2022 Ukrainian refugee crisis, the number of Ukrainians living in Slovakia increased, thus being larger in number than in Slovakia's southern neighbor, Hungary.

== History ==
As neighbouring peoples, Slovaks and Ukrainians have a long history of contacts. First information about the settlement of Ruthenians from modern Ukraine in lands of today's Slovakia comes from the 14th century, when those territories belonged to the Kingdom of Hungary. During the second half of the 18th century many Ruthenian settlers from the area of Priashiv moved to Bačka, where they reside to this day, while those who remained frequently assimilated. Most Ruthenians engaged in agriculture, but many of them eventually joined gangs of brigands and took part in the Rakoczi revolt of 1703-1711. Initially Eastern Orthodox, after the 1646 Union of Uzhhorod the majority of local Ruthenian population belonged to Eastern Catholic rite.

During the 19th century, a cultural awakening of Ruthenians started thanks to the work of priest Alexander Dukhnovych and Supreme Ruthenian Council member Adolf Dobriansky. During the latter part of the century, increasing Magyarization and outflow of the local Ruthenian population led to a demographic stagnation. Following the end of World War I in 1918, a popular meeting in Stará Ľubovňa supported the unification of Priashiv region with Ukraine. However, other local leaders supported the unification with Czechoslovakia, and their position eventually prevailed. During the Interwar period, emigration decreased, but this led to overpopulation. In terms of national identity and political orientation, the community of Priashiv region was divided into three main groups: Moscophiles, Carpatho-Rusyns and Ukrainophiles. In 1930 the latter group established a branch of Prosvita in Priashiv. Between 1922 and 1925, local activists demanded the unification of the region with Carpathian Ruthenia, but unsuccessfully. In 1935 anti-tax riots took place in Čertižné and Habura.

Starting from the early 20th century, Slovakization of Ukrainians and Ruthenians living in the territory of today's Slovakia, most of them in Priashiv region, was conducted, as a result of which many of them assimilated into the Slovak nation. This policy was supported by the Slovak National Party and the Slovak Republic authorities, as a result of which parts of the Ukrainian minority in Slovakia developed pro-Soviet sympathies. Many Ukrainians fought in the ranks of Slovak partisans and Czechoslovak Corps of the Soviet Army during World War II. Between 1944 and 1946 units of Galicia Division and Ukrainian Insurgent Army were present in parts of Slovakia. In 1939 Bratislava served as a temporary seat of the Ukrainian Trade Academy, which had been evacuated from Transcarpathia.

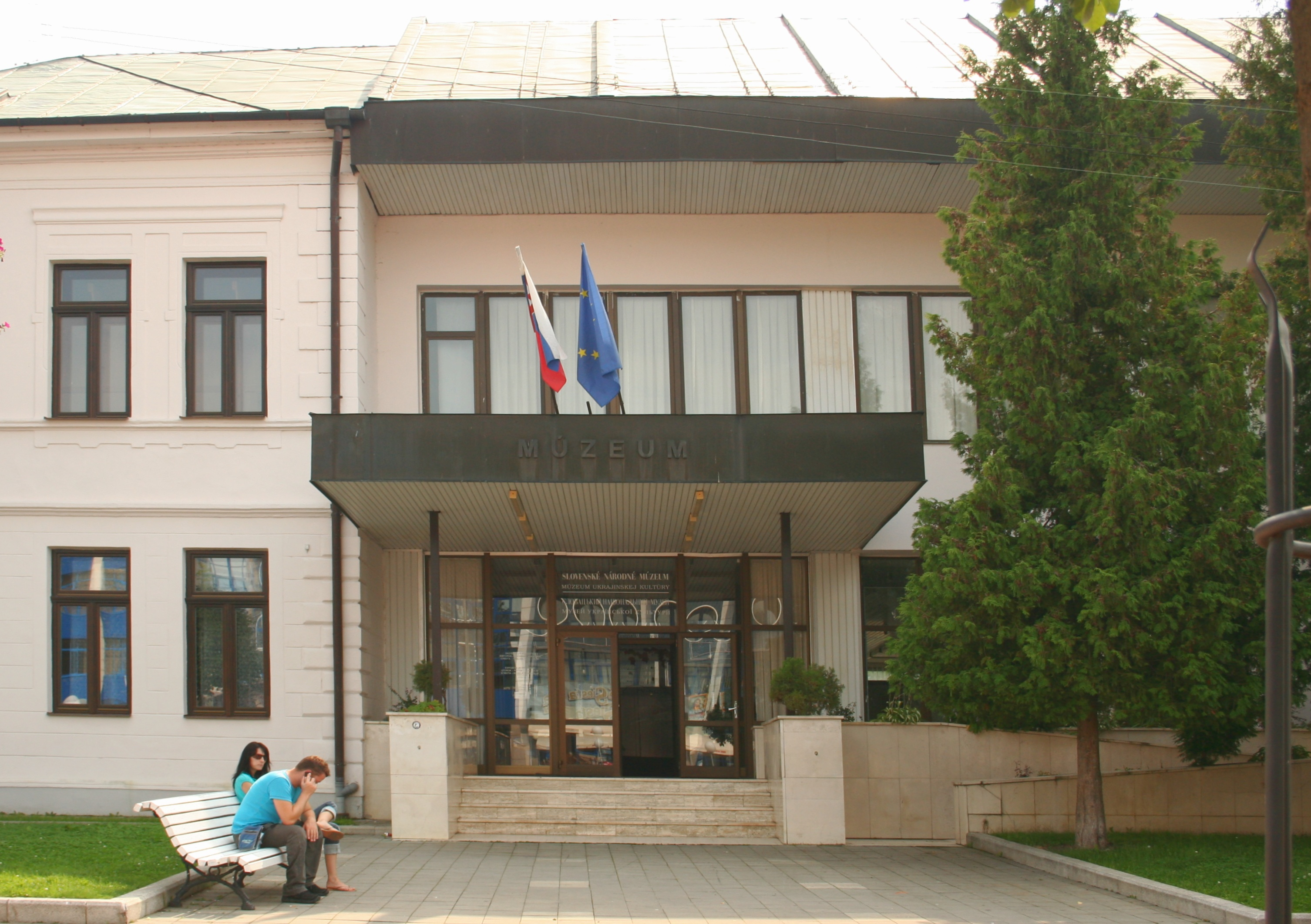
Museum of Ukrainian Culture in Svidník

After the entry of Soviet troops into Slovakia, on 1 March 1945 the Ukrainian People's Council of Priashivshchyna was established. Its members promoted the idea of uniting their region with Transcarpathia as part of the Soviet Union, but found no support among the Soviet authorities. Eventually, the council was recognized to be the chief representative of the Ukrainian minority in Czechoslovakia, and had its representatives in the temporary Czechoslovak parliament and in the Slovak National Council. In 1950 the Greek Catholic Church in Priashiv area was liquidated and subordinated to the Orthodox. In 1951 Ukrainian language was introduced in local schools, but that step met opposition from large parts of the population. The Ukrainian People's Council was liquidated in 1952 on demand of authorities and replaced by another organization fully controlled by the Communist Party.

Ukrainian Communists played an important role in the political life of Slovakia after the war. During the first postwar decades, Ukrainian culture and literature were greatly popularized in the country thanks to the work of Bratislava University and Slovak Academy of Sciences. Despite this, a number of Ukrainian schools in the region of Priashiv were liquidated during that period, and an ethnic Slovak was appointed head of the local Greek Catholic eparchy. During the term of Alexander Dubček in 1968-1969 some Slovaks called for deportation of all Ukrainians from the area to Soviet Ukraine. As of 1970, there were 42,000 Ukrainians in Slovakia, although other estimates presented numbers of up to 145,000. Most of them were concentrated in the area of Priashiv, but there were also sizeable populations in Košice and Bratislava.

As of 2011, 7,430 inhabitants of the Priashiv region declared themselves to be of Ukrainian ethnicity, compared to over 35,000 who identified as Rusyns. After Slovakia became an independent state, the country's authorities started promoting Rusyn self-identification as an alternative to Ukrainian identity. Currently, the only cultural organization to use the name "Ukrainian" in its name is the "Museum of Ukrainian-Rusyn Culture" in Svidník.

== Notable people ==
- Vasiľ Biľak, Slovak Communist politician of Rusyn-Ukrainian ethnicity

== See also ==
- Slovakia–Ukraine relations
- Ruthenians and Ukrainians in Czechoslovakia (1918–1938)
- 2022 Ukrainian refugee crisis
- Ukrainians in the Czech Republic
- Ukrainians in Poland
- Slovaks in Ukraine
