= Union of Carpathian Youth =

The Union of Carpathian Youth (Russian: Союз молодежи Карпат, abbreviated SMK) was an organization of ethnic Ukrainian youth in the Prešov Region of Czechoslovakia. SMK was founded on May 24, 1945. The SMK organ was the monthly publication Kolokol'chik (Колокольчик, 'The Little Bell', in Russian), with a Ukrainian language supplement called Dzvinochok (Дзвіночо, 'The Little Bell'). SMK also issued Slovo molodezhy ('Free Youth'), a supplement to the newspaper Priashevshchina. The organization took part in the coordination of youth organizations in Czechoslovakia, along with the Union of Czech Youth, the Union of Slovak Youth and the Union of Polish Youth, and supported the line of the Communist Party of Czechoslovakia to build a unitary youth movement.

The core group behind the organization had a Russophile orientation. Initially SMK was led by I. Dzurenda, who was succeeded by A. Yedynak and A. Sushko.

As of 1949 SMK claimed to have some 20,000 members, organized in 225 local branches. In the same year, SMK merged with the Czech, Slovak and Polish youth organizations to form the Czechoslovak Youth Union.

In midst of the 1968 Prague Spring, there was a failed attempt to resurrect SMK.
