= Priashevshchina =

Priashevshchina masthead

Priashevshchina (Пряшевщина) was a Russian language newspaper published from Prešov from March 18, 1945 to August 1951. It was the organ of the Ukrainian People's Council of the Prešov Region, a pro-Soviet structure that appeared at the late stage of World War II. Priashevshchina initially appeared semiweekly, later becoming a weekly. Priashevshchina was the first newspaper for the Ruthenian/Ukrainian population in the area to appear after the liberation of the Presov region. Chief editors of the newspaper were Ivan P'eščak and Fedor Lazoryk. P'eščak, former parliamentarian of the First Czechoslovak Republic who had called for Rusyn national autonomy in the Prešov region after the Munich Agreement, had previously published the newspaper Priashevskaya Rus.

In addition to political issues, Priashevshchina also promoted local literature and had a positive impact on the dissemination of Rusyn literature.

The publication was managed by Russophiles, and was mainly printed in standard literary Russian language. However, especially in the last two years of existence, it carried minor pieces in Prešov vernacular. The newspaper was largely pro-Soviet in this editorial tone and contained reports on life in the Soviet Union. But whilst the publication was issued in Russian it addressed political issues from a Ukrainian, or at least localized, angle.

In terms of 'Ukrainianism', reflecting the Ukrainian People's Council line, Priashevshchina argued that "[o]ne and the same nation lives on the territory of Transcarpathian Ukraine and the Prešov region. There is no doubt that this nation is a part of the Little Russian-Ukrainian nation. Because the entire Little Russian nation has accepted the name "Ukrainian" we in the Prešov region also accept the name Ukrainian to show our unity with the great Ukrainian nation. Once we are the same nation as the nation of Transcarpathian Ukraine, Western Ukraine and Soviet Ukraine, we cannot call ourselves anything different from our brothers." The use of the term 'Ukrainian' sought to repress previous identity markers such as 'Lemko', 'Rusyn' and 'Rusnak'. Over the years, Slovak authorities began to increasingly fear that Priashevshchina and the Ukrainian People's Council, articulated separatist ambitions for the annexation of the Prešov region by the Soviet Union (on similar lines as Transcarpathian Ukraine). On April 1, 1945 Priashevshchina had called for the formation of armed militias in the region.

Priashevshchina ceased to appear on August 16, 1951, following a resolution by the Ukrainian People's Council in reaction to the formation of a new organization for the Ruthenian/Ukrainian minority (the Cultural Union of Ukrainian Workers in the CSSR). The Ukrainian People's Council, was eventually closed in December 1952, as part of the drive by Czechoslovak authorities to substitute the language of the Ruthenians from Russian to Ukrainian.
