= Elizabeth Jaranyi =

Elizabeth Ester Jaranyi
- Born: Elizabeth Ester Herczfeld; February 19, 1918; Nagykanizsa, Austria-Hungary
- Died: February 23, 1998 (aged 80); Glenwood Springs, Colorado
- Known for: Holocaust survivor

Elizabeth Ester Jaranyi (née: Herczfeld) (February 19, 1918 – February 26, 1998) was a survivor of Nazi concentration camps during the Holocaust and the memorist of The Flowers From My Mother's Garden.

== Early life and Holocaust experiences ==
On April 26, 1944, the collection of Jews in Nagykanizsa began, and they were herded into the Nagykanizsa Ghetto. Around 1800 people were gathered there, including Jaranyi. The ghettoization was handled by Hungarian security forces rather than German soldiers. On April 28, 1944, all Jewish men were deported from the ghetto by train for Auschwitz. On May 18, 1944, all remaining people were taken from the ghetto and sent to the same destination. The train ride took six days, which Jaranyi describes in her memoir in detail.

When Jaranyi arrived at Auschwitz, she was sorted into Birkenau, one camp of many inside of Auschwitz. The Flowers From My Mother's Garden recounts her time in Auschwitz and subsequent transfer to Neustadt-Glewe, a satellite work camp of the women-only Ravensbrück Concentration Camp. Neustadt-Glewe was liberated by American and Red Army forces on May 2, 1945. This included Jaranyi's liberation as well as the other Neustadt-Glewe occupants'.

The Flowers From My Mother's Garden also recounts Jaranyi's liberation and time after the war, up to her later life after she had emigrated abroad.

== After World War II ==
After the end of World War II, Jaranyi emigrated to the United States. According to Flowers, she married and had children. She died February 26, 1998, in Glenwood Springs, Colorado.

== In literature ==
Jaranyi's memoir has been added to the American Library of Congress.

She has been quoted in Phillip L. Berman's book The Search for Meaning: Americans Talk About What They Believe and Why. In the book, Berman quotes Jaranyi about losing her faith in God during her concentration camp experience in Auschwitz. There is also a section written exclusively about her titled 'Why Me?'

Jaranyi is also quoted in Re-examining the holocaust through literature by Aukje Kluge and Benn E. Williams.

Jaranyi is listed in the Benjamin and Vladka Meed Registry of Jewish Holocaust Survivors 2000, Volume 3. She is also listed in Dimensions, Volumes 6-7, a collection from Northwestern University of Holocaust survivors.
