= Nagykanizsa =

- City with county rights
- Nagykanizsa Megyei Jogú Város
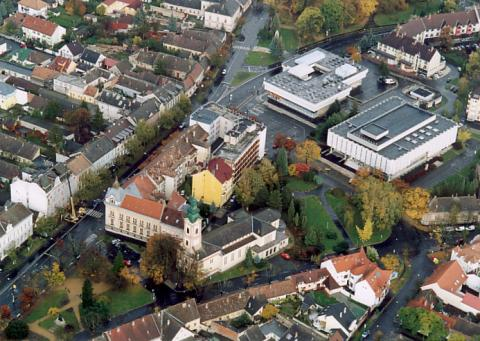

- Flag Coat of arms
- Interactive map of Nagykanizsa
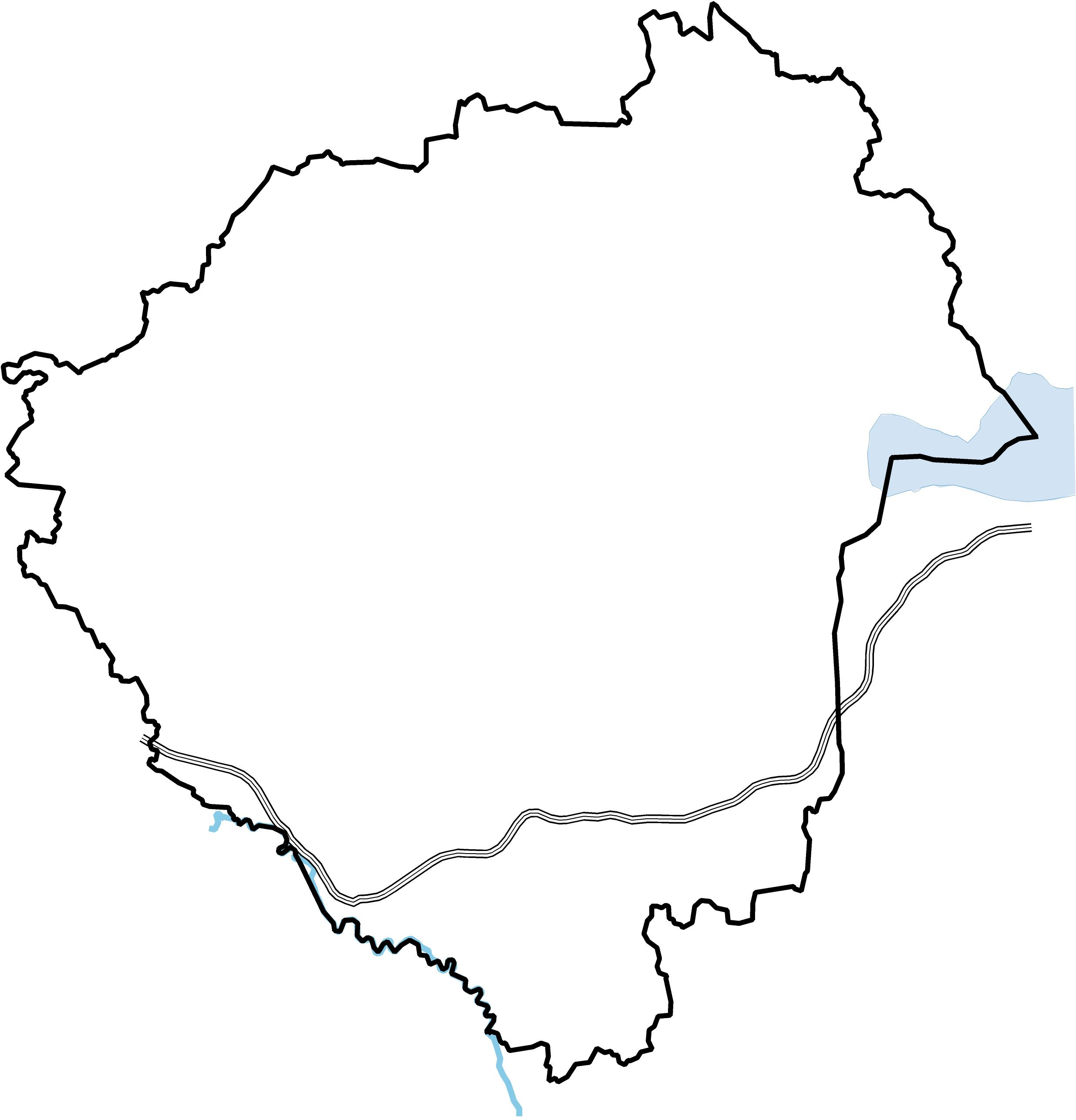
- Location of Nagykanizsa Nagykanizsa (Hungary)
- Coordinates: 46°27′18″N 16°59′33″E
- Country: Hungary
- County: Zala
- District: Nagykanizsa

Government
  - Mayor: Horváth Jácint (ÉVE-DK-Jobbik-LMP-Momentum-MSZP)

Area
  - Total: 148.40 km^{2} (57.30 sq mi)

Population (2017)
  - Total: 47,349
  - Rank: 20th in Hungary
  - Density: 319.06/km^{2} (826.37/sq mi)
- Demonym(s): kanizsai, nagykanizsai

Population by ethnicity
  - Hungarians: 85.1%
  - Roma: 1.3%
  - Germans: 1.0%
  - Croats: 1.0%
  - Romanians: 0.1%
  - Others: 0.6%

Population by religion
  - Roman Catholic: 56.7%
  - Greek Catholic: 0.1%
  - Calvinists: 1.9%
  - Lutherans: 1.7%
  - Jews: 0.1%
  - Other: 0.8%
  - Non-religious: 11.1%
  - Unknown: 27.6%
- Time zone: UTC+1 (CET)
  - Summer (DST): UTC+2 (CEST)
- Postal code: 8800
- Area code: (+36) 93
- Motorways: M7
- Distance from Budapest: 214 km (133 mi) Northeast
- Website: nagykanizsa.hu

Nagykanizsa (Note: Croatian: Velika Kaniža/Velika Kanjiža, or just Kaniža/Kanjiža; Slovak: Veľká Kaniža; German: Großkirchen, Groß-Kanizsa; Italian: Canissa; Slovene: Velika Kaniža; Turkish: Kanije)) (Hungarian pronunciation: [ˈnɒckɒniʒɒ]), known colloquially as Kanizsa, is a medium-sized city in Zala County in southwestern Hungary. It is a city with county rights.

It lies not far from Lake Balaton at the meeting point of five routes. For centuries the town has been a connecting link. Goods from Slavonia were transported to Graz via Nagykanizsa, and the town played an important role in the trade from the Adriatic Sea to the Alpine region, Vienna, and Budapest.

== History ==
The city's oldest Roman-era ruins were excavated in the 1960s. During the Middle Ages, Nagykanizsa became one of the most important strongholds of the Hungarian Kingdom. The fortress had a significant role in the southern shield-line of Hungary, guarding the whole of Western Europe against attacks by the Ottoman Empire.

The name Kanizsa was first mentioned in a document in 1245. The Kanizsai family continued building the castle and constructed a rectangular castle with an enclosed back yard on an islet in the River Kanizsa. The town and the castle were in their prime in the first half of the 16th century, when Kanizsa became a centre of trade with Italy and Styria.

Szigetvár and Kanizsa became the most important strongholds in southern Hungary. In 1600, the Turkish army occupied the castle. This castle was the center of an Ottoman eyalet including the sanjaks of Sigetvar, Kopan, Valpuva, Siklos, Nadaj, and Balatin until 1690 (see Ottoman Hungary), when the city was invaded by the Habsburg armies.

In 1601, during the Ottoman-Habsburg War of 1593–1606, a siege began on September 9 and ended on November 18. The Habsburg forces were commanded by Ferdinand, the Archduke of Austria, and Tiryaki Hasan Pasha commanded the defence of the castle. Hasan Pasha won the fight against the ten-times larger army of Austrians with many cunning military ploys, and was raised to the rank of Vizier.

At the beginning of the 18th century, the holder of the castle moved German, Croatian, and Serbian settlers into the deserted town. A particularly mixed ethnic group lived in a suburb called Kiskanizsa. After the Turks were driven out (1690), the town lost its strategic significance, so the Vienna war council demolished the castle in 1702.

Business became lively, trade became important again, and crafts developed significantly. In 1765 the Piarist order started to provide elementary and secondary education' supported by Lajos Batthyány, palatine of Hungary. The first business school of Transdanubia opened in Nagykanizsa, and in 1895 it was made into a college.

Many people who had attended Nagykanizsa's schools became famous: Benedek Virág, Pál Király, Ferenc Deák, Károly Kaán, Sándor Hevesi, and Ferenc Mező all studied in the ancient buildings of Nagykanizsa's almae matres.

Nagykanizsa started a new phase of large-scale development in the 1860s. The railway connecting Nagykanizsa with Vienna, Budapest, and Rijeka was constructed at that time. There was rapid development in industry as well. Industrial and commercial development resulted in the foundation of banks. Besides the four local banks, an Austro-Hungarian and an Anglo-Hungarian bank also opened branch offices in town. Telephone lines were established and the town was connected with a long-distance system in 1895. At the same time, a 70-bed hospital was opened.

During World War I, military barracks were built in the town. This necessitated the construction of a municipal water-network. Kanizsa became a modern town; drainage-system construction and paving of streets began. World War I caused grave consequences - changes in international boundaries isolated Kanizsa, which lost its markets in the south and west.

Oil helped the town to survive. After successful exploration by the American corporation Eurogasco, Hungarian-American Oil Inc. (Hungarian: Magyar Amerikai Olajipari Reszvenytarsasag - MAORT) was formed in 1938. Nagykanizsa became the centre of the Hungarian oil industry. Near the end of World War II, the Nagykanizsa oil-fields were the last remaining ones available to the Germans, and to protect these fields the Wehrmacht launched the last German offensive of the war, Operation Spring Awakening, on 6 March 1945. This failed (15 March 1945) and the town soon fell to the Soviet and Bulgarian Nagykanizsa–Körmend Offensive of March to April 1945.

Beer brewed in Kanizsa Brewery regained its reputation as one of the best Hungarian beers, carrying off the palm at more and more international competitions – at the beginning of the century the brewery was closed as demand for beer fell drastically. Kanizsa Trend Ltd. grew out of the company, with its furniture products gaining a high reputation all over Europe. The predecessor of the present-day Tungsram Plc, now belonging to General Electric, started operations in 1965. It is now one of the biggest light-bulb factories in the world.

Károlyi Park, City Park, and large squares like Kossuth, Eötvös, and Erzsébet squares were extended after 1962. A boating lake was formed, becoming a popular recreation centre. In the 2010s Nagykanizsa attracts thousands of dental tourists.

== Climate ==
Nagykanizsa's climate is classified as oceanic climate (Köppen Cfb). The annual average temperature is 10.5 °C (50.9 °F), the hottest month in July is 20.9 °C (69.6 °F), and the coldest month is 0.0 °C (32.0 °F) in January. The annual precipitation is 733.1 millimetres (28.86 in), of which September is the wettest with 83.9 millimetres (3.30 in), while January is the driest with only 31.6 millimetres (1.24 in). The extreme temperature throughout the year ranged from −22.9 °C (−9.2 °F) on December 31, 1996, to 38.4 °C (101.1 °F) on July 20, 2007.

Climate data for Nagykanizsa, 1991−2020 normals
Month	Jan	Feb	Mar	Apr	May	Jun	Jul	Aug	Sep	Oct	Nov	Dec	Year
Record high °C (°F)	17.4 (63.3)	21.4 (70.5)	23.6 (74.5)	29.8 (85.6)	32.9 (91.2)	35.2 (95.4)	38.4 (101.1)	38.3 (100.9)	32.3 (90.1)	26.9 (80.4)	23.6 (74.5)	17.9 (64.2)	38.4 (101.1)
Mean daily maximum °C (°F)	3.9 (39.0)	6.7 (44.1)	11.7 (53.1)	17.4 (63.3)	21.8 (71.2)	25.7 (78.3)	27.3 (81.1)	27.3 (81.1)	21.7 (71.1)	16.4 (61.5)	9.8 (49.6)	4.4 (39.9)	16.2 (61.2)
Daily mean °C (°F)	0.0 (32.0)	1.7 (35.1)	6.0 (42.8)	11.0 (51.8)	15.4 (59.7)	19.2 (66.6)	20.9 (69.6)	20.3 (68.5)	15.2 (59.4)	10.3 (50.5)	5.5 (41.9)	0.8 (33.4)	10.5 (50.9)
Mean daily minimum °C (°F)	−3.3 (26.1)	−2.6 (27.3)	0.7 (33.3)	4.7 (40.5)	8.9 (48.0)	12.6 (54.7)	14.1 (57.4)	13.5 (56.3)	9.6 (49.3)	5.1 (41.2)	1.7 (35.1)	−2.4 (27.7)	5.2 (41.4)
Record low °C (°F)	−18.7 (−1.7)	−21.9 (−7.4)	−19.2 (−2.6)	−7.5 (18.5)	−2.2 (28.0)	2.0 (35.6)	4.3 (39.7)	3.9 (39.0)	−0.3 (31.5)	−9.2 (15.4)	−11.5 (11.3)	−22.9 (−9.2)	−22.9 (−9.2)
Average precipitation mm (inches)	31.6 (1.24)	42.7 (1.68)	38.7 (1.52)	47.2 (1.86)	68.9 (2.71)	79.7 (3.14)	81.4 (3.20)	74.3 (2.93)	83.9 (3.30)	69.3 (2.73)	62.9 (2.48)	53.4 (2.10)	733.1 (28.86)
Average precipitation days (≥ 1.0 mm)	5.6	6.0	5.9	6.9	8.7	9.0	8.0	6.9	7.7	6.7	8.1	7.1	86.6
Average relative humidity (%)	84.0	76.1	70.9	67.7	71.3	72.4	72.6	74.7	80.7	84.6	86.1	85.9	77.3
Source: NOAA

== Education ==
=== High schools ===
Batthyány Lajos High School

Dr. Mező Ferenc High School

== Politics ==
The current mayor of Nagykanizsa is Jácint Horváth (ÉVE-DK-Jobbik-LMP-Momentum-MSZP).

The local Municipal Assembly, elected at the 2019 local government elections, is made up of 15 members (1 Mayor, 10 individual ward members and 4 compensation-list members) divided into these political parties and alliances:

Party	Seats	Current Municipal Assembly
Opposition coalition (Note: Coalition of ÉVE-DK-Jobbik-MSZP-LMP-Momentum.)	8	
Fidesz-KDNP	7	M

== Sport ==
- Nagykanizsa FC, association football club

== Notable people ==
- Kanijeli Siyavuş Paşa, Grand Vizier of the Ottoman Empire
- Edmund Gutmann, known Hungarian-Croatian wholesaler and industrialist
- Elizabeth Jaranyi, Holocaust survivor and author
- Leopold Wittelshöfer (1818–1889), physician
- Ferenc Fejtő, journalist and political scientist
- Kornél Dávid, NBA player
- Lajos Balázsovits, Hungarian film actor
- Győző Zemplén, physicist
- Ferenc Farkas, composer
- Szabina Tálosi, football player
- Ferenc Mező, olympic gold medalist
- János Rózsás, writer, Gulag survivor and later expert
- Johann Schnitzler, Austrian Jewish laryngologist
- Gyula Wlassics, Hungarian Minister of Religion and Education between 1895 and 1903

== Gallery ==
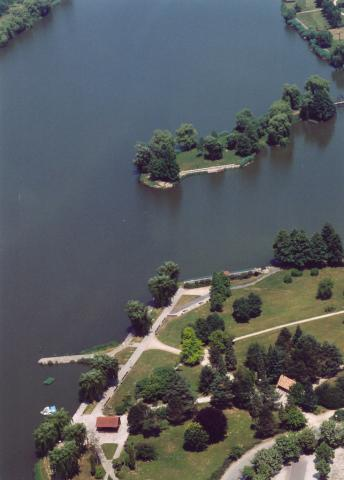
Lake Csónakázó (boating)

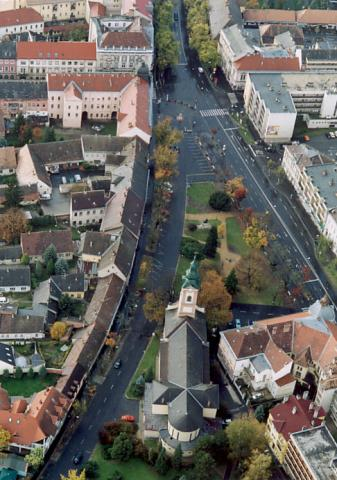
Deák Square

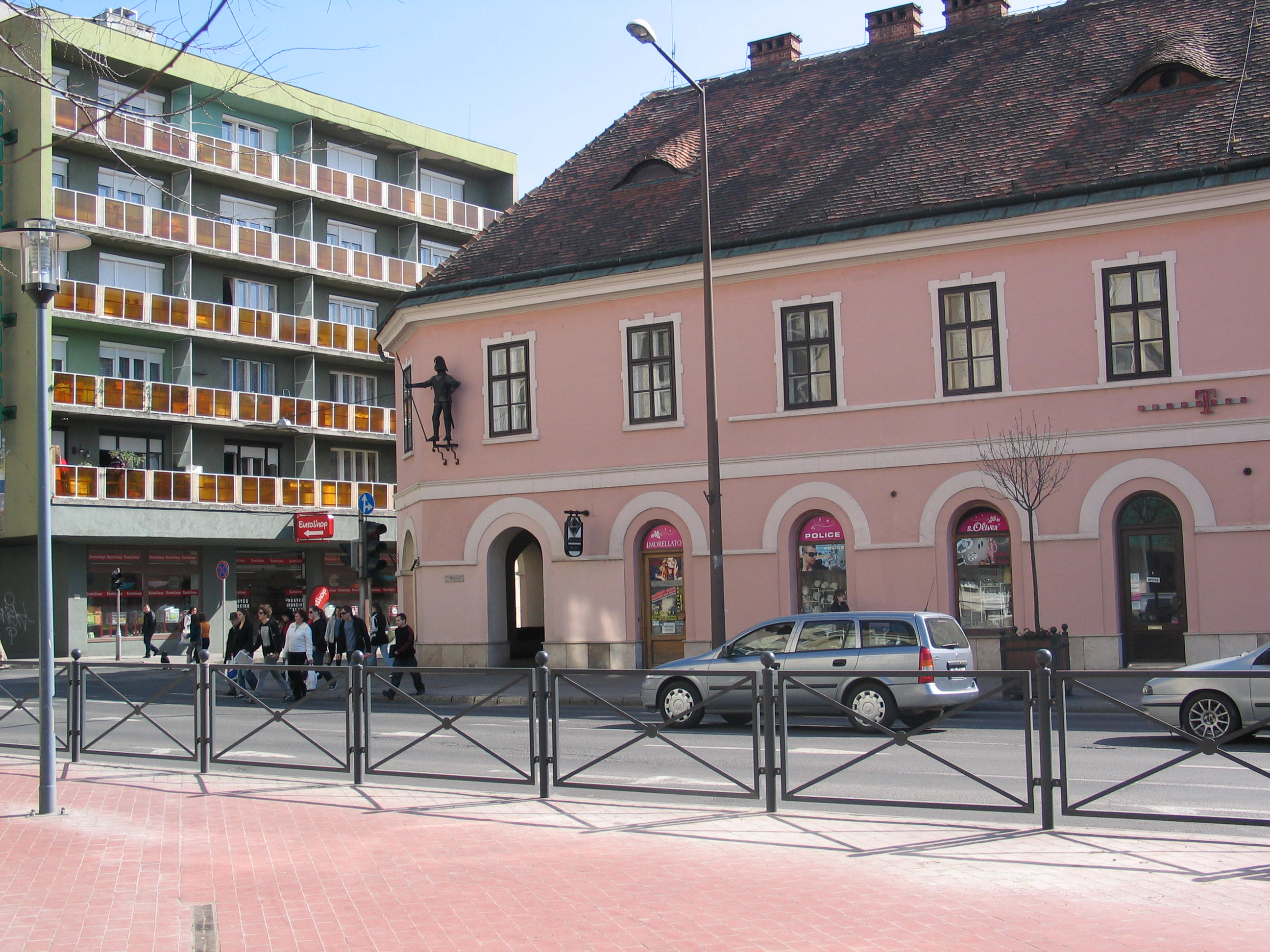
The Iron Man, the sign of the former ironmonger's shop on the wall of the House of the Iron Man

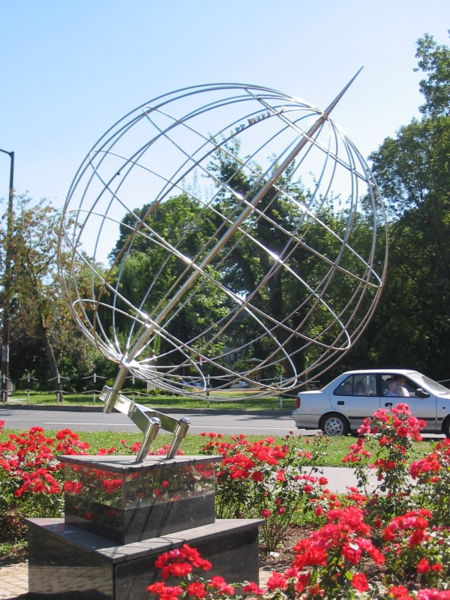
The 17th eastern longitude monument erected by the Town Supporting Association

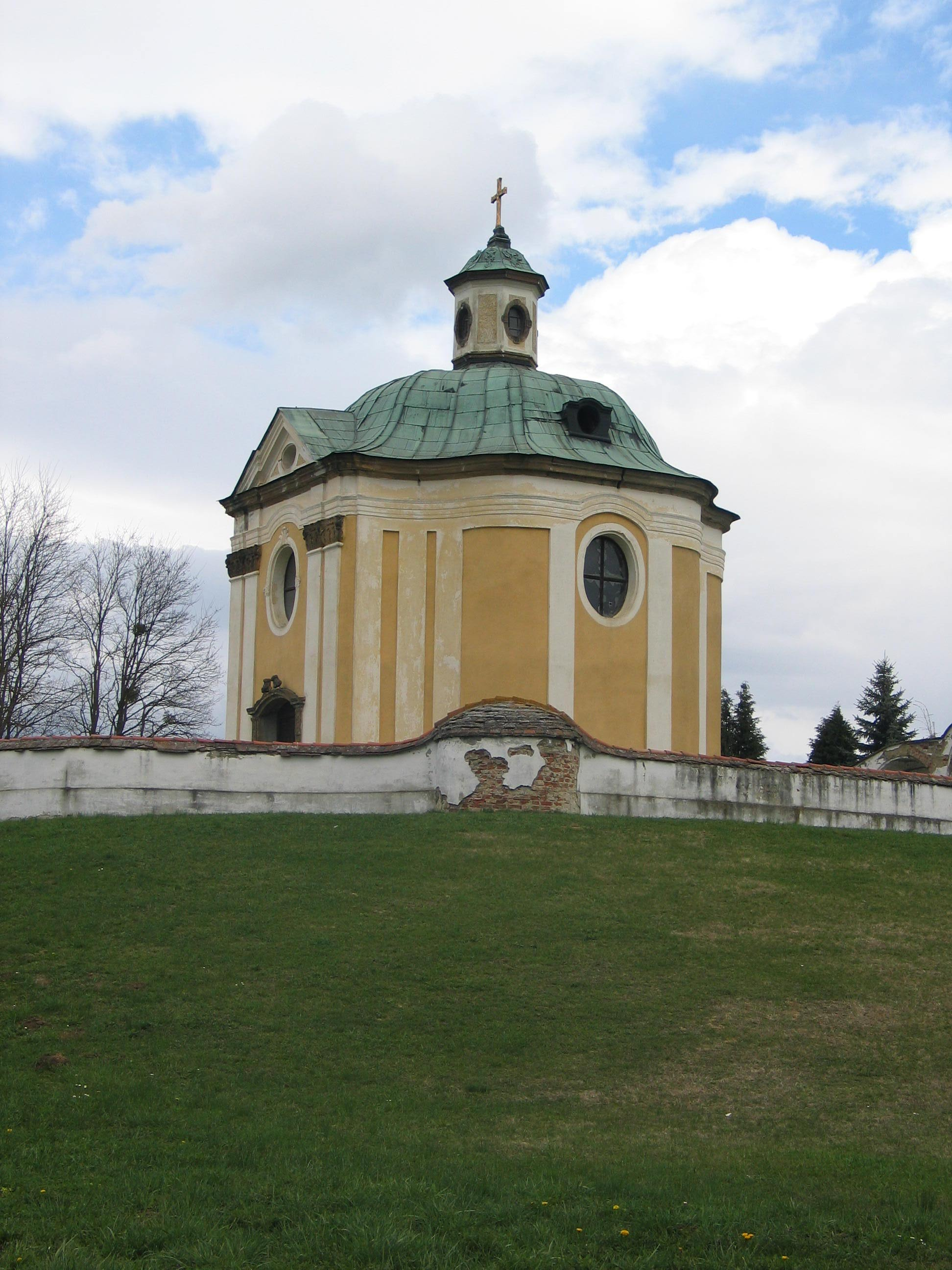
The baroque Inkey chapel

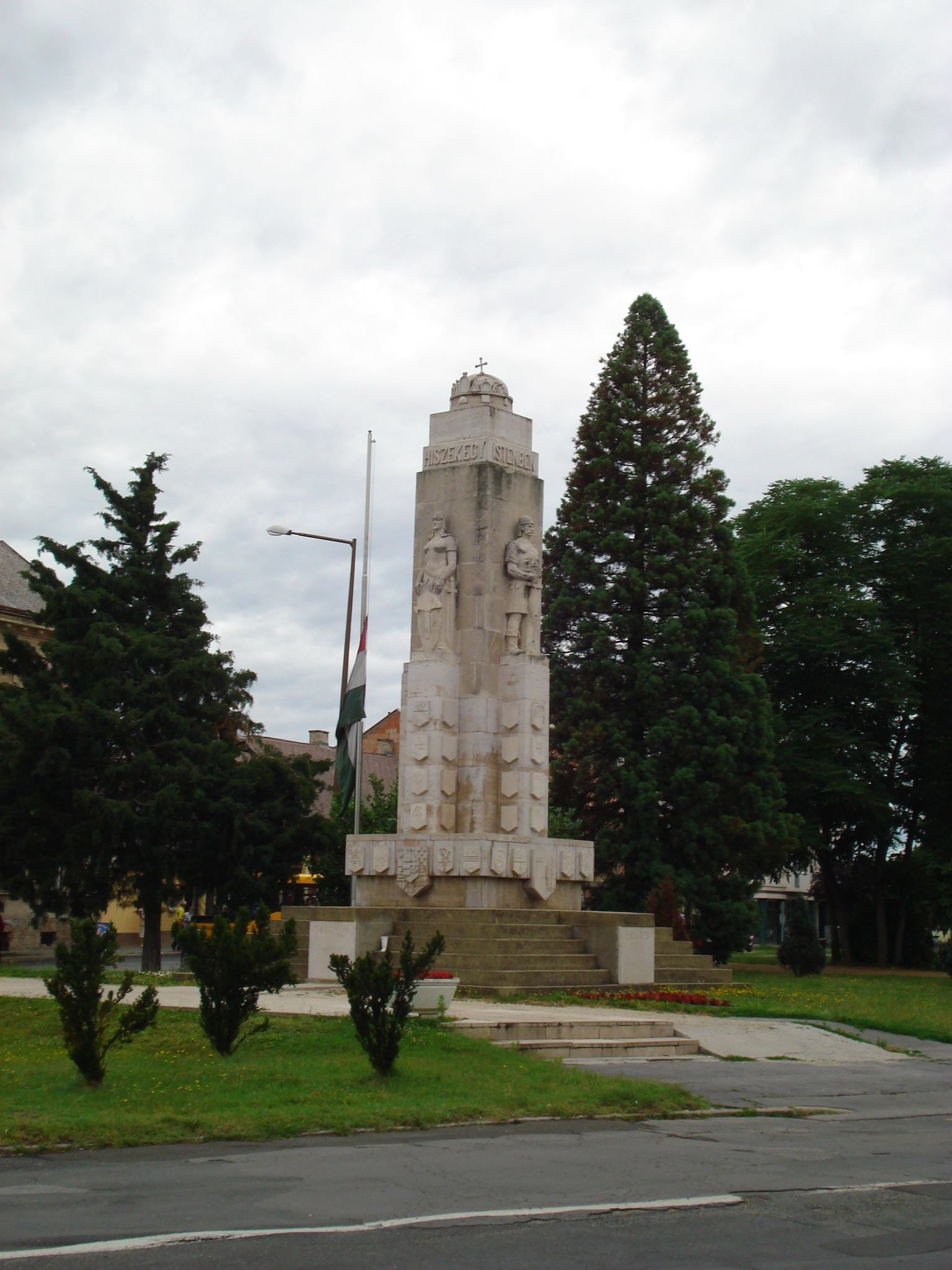
Monument to the Greater Hungary

== Twin towns – sister cities ==
Nagykanizsa is twinned with:

- Acre, Israel
- Bihać, Bosnia and Herzegovina
- Čakovec, Croatia
- Covasna, Romania
- Gleisdorf, Austria
- Kanjiža, Serbia
- Kazanlak, Bulgaria
- Puchheim, Germany
- Salo, Finland
- Shijiazhuang, China
- (Russia) Tolyatti, Tudnád
- Hellín, Spain

== Bibliography ==
- Claire Norton, "The Remembrance of the Sieges of Kanije in the Construction of Late Ottoman and Modern Turkish Nationalist Identities," Parergon, 21,1 (2004), 133–154.
