= Shoshone Hydroelectric Generating Station =

Power plant in Colorado

Coordinates: 39°34′12″N 107°13′37″W

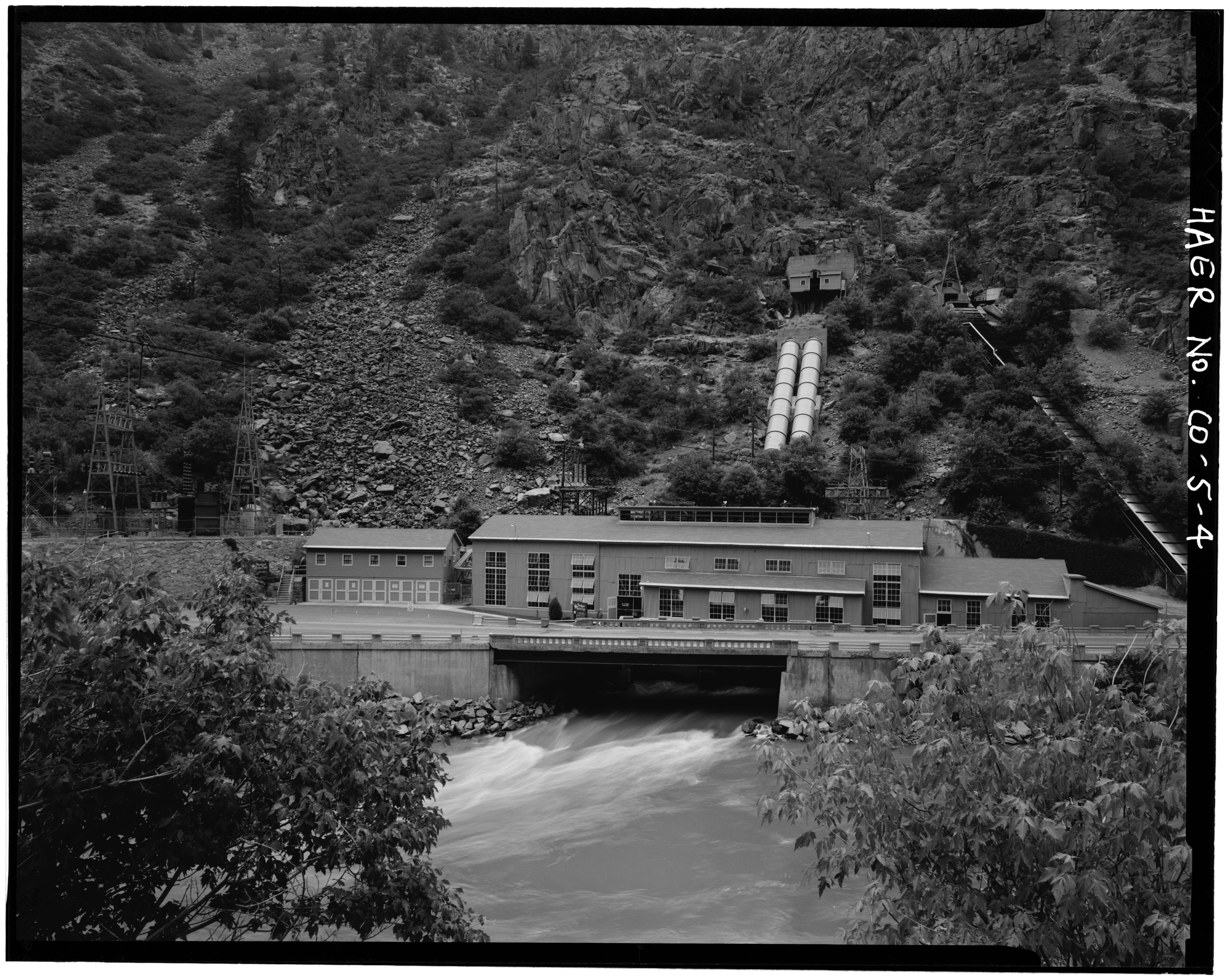
Shoshone Hydroelectric Generating Station prior to the construction of Interstate 70

The Shoshone Hydroelectric Generating Station is a hydroelectric power plant on the Colorado River east of Glenwood Springs, Colorado. In addition to its power output, the water rights the plant uses are among the oldest on the Colorado River, and play a major role in the flow of water to the Western Slope of Colorado.

The Shoshone plant was constructed in the early 1900s, with its turbines installed in 1906 and power generation beginning in 1909. The plant has a maximum capacity of 15 MW from two 7.5 MW generators driven by two turbines, though typical power output is around 14 MW. Water to drive the turbines is drawn from the river at a dam about 2 miles (3.2 km) upstream of the powerplant, and carried through tunnels to penstocks above the station, after which it is returned to the river. Shoshone is owned and operated by Xcel Energy, and while its power output is comparatively small against most of the utility's generating stations, it is used to balance regional electricity needs.

Shoshone holds water rights to 1,250 cubic feet (35 m^{3}) per second of Colorado River water, which date back to 1902. This predates rights owned by entities on Colorado's Front Range, which draw water from where most of the state's precipitation falls on the Western Slope across the Continental Divide to major population centers east of the Rocky Mountains. By ensuring a consistent flow of water downstream on the river, Shoshone supports diverse sectors of the Western Slope economy, including river recreation, agriculture, and public utility use. The water rights have been largely preserved—in 2007, Xcel and Denver Water made a deal to reduce Shoshone's water rights to 704 cubic feet (19.9 m^{3}) per second if warranted by low water levels during the spring snowmelt runoff season, prior to peak summer demand by recreation and agriculture. Otherwise, the original 1902 rights remained in effect, and were strengthened in 2016 when the Shoshone Outage Protocol was signed by a number of Colorado River stakeholders. The plan, an update to an addendum in a broader 2012 agreement, maintains the power plant's water rights even when electricity is not being generated—previously, when the plant was offline it yielded its water rights to claims that would otherwise hold lower priority.
