= Blake Paul Neubert =

American painter

Blake Neubert
- Born: January 30, 1981 (age 45); Glenwood Springs, CO, U.S.
- Known for: Painting, Illustrating, Writing

Blake Paul Neubert (born January 30, 1981, in Glenwood Springs, Colorado, U.S.) is an American painter and illustrator.

== Early life ==
Neubert was born in Glenwood Springs, Colorado, in 1981.

== Early career ==
Neubert attended Northwest College in Powell, Wyoming, and the University of Wyoming in Laramie, Wyoming. He graduated in 2005 with a bachelor's degree in art education. At that point he moved to Douglas, Wyoming, to pursue work as an elementary school art teacher. After a year teaching, he abandoned that field and relocated to Ft. Collins, Colorado, to focus on his artwork.

Neubert was accepted into the "Buffalo Bill Art Show and Sale" as the youngest artist ever to participate. Neubert’s work was featured in the “Out West: The Great American Landscape” art show that traveled China. As part of this art show his work then toured much of China, showing at the National Art Museum of China in Beijing, The Ürümqi Art Museum in Ürümqi, Shanxi Art Museum in Xi’an, the Shanghai Art Museum and the Shanghai Painting Institute in Shanghai, the Qingdao Modern Art Centre in Qingdao, and the Hong Kong Heritage Discovery Centre in Hong Kong. One of Neubert's pieces featured in these shows, Bull Rider and the Cody Nite Rodeo, is notable in that it takes a step beyond his traditional use of Impressionism and reaches toward Expressionism. His Kandinsky-esque use of color and line emphasizes the feeling of being on a bull and makes it possible for the viewer to imagine actually being in the place of the bull rider.

Neubert has also completed murals for the University of Wyoming, Budweiser, and the City of Fort Collins and many businesses throughout Wyoming, Colorado, and Montana. He also is a participating artist in the "Richard Schmid Art Show".

== Supplies ==
Neubert paints exclusively with Gamblin paints, and draws with Prismacolor Nupastels.

== Personal life ==
In 2008, Neubert married Ft. Collins area photographer Sarah Boyd.
