= Berenice Mallory =

American home economist (1901–1997)

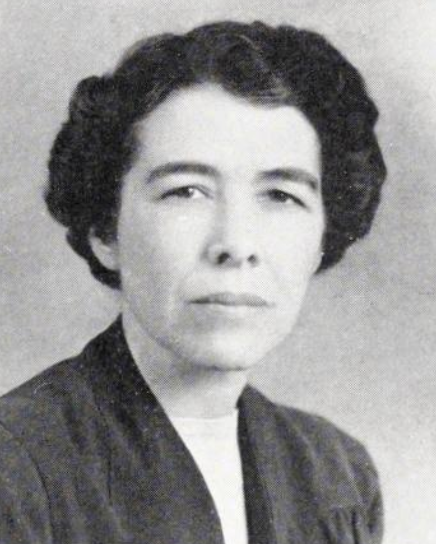
- Berenice Mallory, from a 1941 publication of the U.S. Office of Education
- Born: November 2, 1901; Glenwood Springs, Colorado
- Died: February 2, 1997 (aged 95); Falls Church, Virginia
- Occupations: Home economist, educator

Berenice Mallory (November 2, 1901 – February 2, 1997) was an American home economist and educator. She was chief of the Home Economics Education Service in the United States Office of Education.

== Early life and education ==
Mallory was born in Glenwood Springs, Colorado and raised in Shreveport, Louisiana, the daughter of Harvey E. Mallory and Cora Alice Davis Mallory. She graduated from Texas College of Industrial Arts in 1923. She earned a master's degree at Iowa State University, and completed doctoral studies at Ohio State University in 1948.

== Career ==
Mallory taught home economics in Texas schools, including those in Nacogdoches, Beaumont, and Austin. She was on the faculty at the University of Texas at Austin beginning in 1933, and held various state-wide positions in Texas.

In 1941, Mallory was appointed as a federal agent for home economics in the North Atlantic states, succeeding her friend and colleague Edna P. Amidon. In the mid-1950s, she taught at Lady Irwin College in India, working with a team from the Agency for International Development (USAID) on building home economics curricula in Indian teachers' colleges. She chaired the United States delegation to the Paris Congress of the International Federation of Home Economics in 1963. She was chief of the Home Economics Education Service, part of the Bureau of Adult Vocational and Technical Education, in the United States Office of Education, based in Washington, D.C. "Housewives must think," she told an Arizona audience in 1959. She retired from the Office of Education in 1970.

Later in life, Mallory was a founder of the Arlington Retirement Housing Corporation (ARHC) and president of the ARHC Board of Directors, and helped to establish Culpepper Garden, a retirement community. She was also one of the founding members of the Unitarian Universalist Church of Arlington.

== Publications ==
- The Teaching of Homemaking: Texas Public Schools (1932, with Bess Caldwell)
- "Economic and Social Problems in Homemaking" (1940, with Jennie S. Wilmot)
- Vitalizing Secondary Education (1951; Mallory was a co-author of this report of the First Commission on Life Adjustment Education for Youth, US Office of Education)
- A Look Ahead in Secondary Education (1954; Mallory was a co-author of this report of the Second Commission on Life Adjustment Education for Youth, US Office of Education)
- Education for Homemaking in the Secondary Schools of the United States (1955, with Mary Laxson Buffum)
- "Curriculum Developments" (1964)
- "Programs for Training Food Service Employees" (1966)
- "International Cooperation Through Home Economics Education" (1969)
- "Auxiliary Workers in Today's Society" (1971)
- Creating a Caring Community: A History of Culpepper Garden 1964-1996 (1996, one of the co-authors of this history by the Culpepper Garden Board of Directors)

== Personal life ==
Mallory died in 1997, at the age of 95, in Falls Church, Virginia.
