= KSNO-FM =

Coordinates: 39.247°N 106.921°W

- Snowmass Village, Colorado; United States
- Broadcast area: Aspen, Colorado
- Frequency: 103.9 MHz
- Branding: Ute City Radio, Open Mind Radio, The Mammoth, The Sound of the Roaring Fork Valley

Programming
- Format: Classic Rock

Ownership
- Owner: Wild Goose LLC; (Wild Goose LLC)

History
- Call sign meaning: referring to SNOwmass tower site or the SNOwy weather

Technical information
- Licensing authority: FCC
- Facility ID: 57337
- Class: A
- ERP: 6,000 watts
- HAAT: 99 meters (325 ft)
- Translators: 94.9 K235AN (Carbondale); 103.5 K278AG (Basalt); 103.5 K278BD (Redstone)
- Repeater: 103.9 KSNO-FM1 (Glenwood Springs)

Links
- Public license information: Public file; LMS
- Webcast: Listen Live
- Website: ksno.net

KSNO-FM (103.9 FM), is a radio station broadcasting a classic rock format. Licensed to Snowmass Village, Colorado, United States, it serves the Aspen and Roaring Fork Valley area, broadcasting from Glenwood Springs to Aspen and into the Snowmass Creek Valley, Redstone and beyond. KSNO was founded as an AM station in 1964 and received its FM licence in the 1980s. The station is owned by Wild Goose LLC and Managed by Andrew C. Scott, founder of the Open Mind Project (www.openmindproject.com), through licensee Wild Goose LLC. KSNO also broadcasts live on the web at www.KSNO.com.
