= Géza Zemplén =

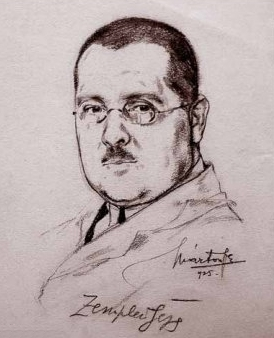
- Born: October 26, 1883; Trencsén, Austria-Hungary
- Died: July 24, 1956 (aged 72); Budapest, Hungary
- Education: Eötvös College Budapest
- Known for: Isolation, synthesis and structure of naturally occurring flavonoid-glycosides
- Awards: Kossuth Prize (1948)
- Scientific career
- Fields: organic chemistry, biochemistry
- Workplaces: Selmecbányai Bányászati és Erdészeti Főiskola, József Nádor Műegyetem, Georgetown University

Géza Gusztáv Zemplén, Ph.D. (26 October 1883 – 24 July 1956) was a notable Hungarian chemist, organic chemist, professor, and chemistry author. He was a recipient of the Kossuth Prize, a member of the Hungarian Academy of Sciences, and was the brother of Professor Győző Zemplén. His major field of research was structural chemistry and biochemistry including the synthesis of naturally occurring flavonoid-glycosides (isolated from plants).

== Life ==
Géza Zemplén was born in Trencsén, the son of János Zemplén and Janka Vittlin, both Roman Catholics. After having completed his secondary education in Fiume, he enrolled in the Eötvös College Budapest in 1900. During his studies he produced two prize-winning works in the sciences. In 1904 he obtained a Ph.D. (doctor rerum naturalium). After having completed his probationary year of teaching, he became a certificated teacher. He then joined the faculty of the College of Mining and Forestry in Selmecbánya in 1905. One year later he was promoted to the post of adjunct professor. He married Margit Heinrich Johanna Friderika (the Roman Catholic daughter of János Heinrich and Emilia Turnovszky) in 1907 in Budapest. However, they were divorced in 1920.

In order to gain further expertise in organic chemistry Zemplén left for Berlin where he worked for 2.5 years for the renowned professor Emil Fischer, first as an assistant and later (on Fischer's invitation) as a colleague in his private laboratory. On the invitation of Emil Abderhalden, an eminent biochemist, Zemplén participated in the writing of Biochemisches Hand-lexikon and also Handbuch der biochemischen Arbeitsmethoden. In 1910 Zemplén returned to his job in Selmecbánya where he was presented the Hungarian Journal of Chemistry Award as well as the Hungarian National Society of Forestry Award. In 1912 he was qualified by the University of Budapest as doctor habil, and in 1913 he was appointed the Head of the newly created Department of Organic Chemistry of the Palatine Joseph Technical University. Beginning in 19l4, he acted as the councilor of the Budapest's Chinoin Pharmaceutical Factory.

In Budapest, on 12 February 1920, Professor Zemplén married the Calvinist Natália Endrédy, the daughter of Károly Endrédy and Irma Helfy. Natália died only a few years later. In 1927 he was elected corresponding member and later, in 1928, a member of the Hungarian Academy of Sciences. The same year he was awarded the Hungarian Academy's Grand Prix, which at that time was the highest national recognition a Hungarian scholar could achieve. In 1932 Dr. Zemplén received the Corvin chain (a national award founded in remembrance of King Mátyás Hunyadi) in recognition of his activity abroad as well as in Hungary.

On 14 October 1933 Professor Zemplén married the Calvinist Karolina Sarolta Rau (born in 1902, parents: András Ernő Rau and Irén Róza Kovács). The wedding was held in the Erzsébet district of Pest. Between 1930 and 1940 Zemplén continued research on the naturally occurring flavonoid-glycosides and succeeded in elucidating the structures of several of them, as well as accomplishing their total syntheses. His research contributed to the industrial isolation and application of flavonoids found in plants. In 1941 he was invited to give a lecture in Germany. During the course of World War II he continued his research although his institute was almost entirely ruined due to the Siege of Budapest.

In 1947, Georgetown University in Washington invited Zemplén as guest professor for one year. Toward the end of his stay in the USA he fell ill with cancer. In Hungary he was among the first to receive the golden level of the Kossuth Prize. He also became a member of the Presidium of the Scientific Council. Professor Zemplén is the author of more than 200 scientific publications and a textbook entitled Szerveskémia ("Organic Chemistry"). He died in Budapest on 24 July 1956.

Zemplén's publications can be found in numerous German and Hungarian chemical journals including the Berichte der Deutschen Chemischen Gesellschaft (German), the Zeitschrift für physiologische Chemie (German), the Zentralblatt für Physiologie (German), Vegyészeti Lapok (Hungarian), in Erdészeti Lapok (Hungarian), in Urania (German), and in the Jahresberichte über Gärungschemie und Gärungsorganismen (German). He had also written articles in Biochemisches Handlexikon on dextrin, inulin, alanine, leucine, histidine, proline, oxyproline, and indol, as well as various starches, celluloses, nitrogen-containing carbohydrates, sulphur-containing amino acids, indol-derivatives, and carbohydrates. In the Handbuch der biochemischen Arbeitsmethoden (1912-1913), Zemplén wrote about the production and detection of glucosides as well as other, higher carbohydrates. Professor Zemplén acted as a referee of several journals in chemistry. A reaction type (transesterifications among carbohydrate derivatives) was named after Zemplén.

== Select publications and works ==
- "Vizes oldatok felületi feszültségéről" (Budapest, 1904; Doctoral thesis)
- "Vizes oldatok felületi feszültségéről" (Budapest, 1907; published in Math. és Term. Értesítő, the M. Chemiai folyóirat and the Annalen der Physik)
- "A kaliumpermanganat hatása a czellulózéra" (Budapest, 1907; Math. és Term. Ért.)
- "Erdei fák leveleinek nitrogén tartalmáról" (Budapest. 1908; Math. és Term. Ért.)
- "Verhalten der Cellobiose u. ihres Osons gegen einige Enzyme" (with Emil Fischer; Berlin, 1909–10; Liebig's Annalen, and M. Ch. folyóirat 1909)
- "Synthese der inaktiven α,δ-Diamino valleriansäure und des Prolnis" (with Emil Fischer; Budapest, 1909; Berichte der deutschen Chemischen Gesellschaft, and M. Chem. Folyóirat 1909)
- "Fából készített czukor és alkohol" (Budapest, 1910)
- "Synthese der beiden optisch aktiven Proline" (with Emil Fischer; Budapest, 1910; Berichte der deutschen Chemischen Gesellschaft, M. Chem. Folyóirat 1911)
- "Neue Synthese von Amino-oxysäuren u. von Piperidon-Derivaten" (with Emil Fischer; Budapest, 1910; Berichte der deutschen Chemischen Gesellschaft)
- "Übers-Amino α-guanido-capronsäure" (with Emil Fischer; Budapest, 1910; Berichte der deutschen Chemischen Gesellschaft)
- "Nachhang" to "Übers-Amino α-guanido-capronsäure" (Budapest)
- "Einige Derivate der Cellobiose" (with Emil Fischer; Budapest, 1911; Berichte der deutschen Chemischen Gesellschaft)
- "Studien über die Polysaccharide spaltenden Fermente in Pilzpressaften" (with Hans Pringsheim; Budapest, 1909; Zeitschrift für physiologische Chemie)
- "Az ureáz ipari alkalmazását czélozó kísérletek" (Budapest, 1912; Vegyészeti Lapok, and Z. für angewandte Chemie 1912)
- "Über die Verbreitung der Urease bei höheren Pflanzen" (Berlin, 1912; Z. für physiol. Chemie)
- "Beiträge zur chemischen Zusammensetzung der Korksubstanz" (Berlin, 1913; Z. für phyxiol. Chemie, and Erdészeti Kísérletek 1913)
- "Beiträge zur partiellen Hydrolyse der Cellulose" (Berlin, 1913; Z. für Phyziol Chemie, and Erdészeti Kisérletek 1913)
- "Uber die Gentiobiose" (Berlin, 1913; Z. für Phyziol Chemie)
- "Verhalten des Emulsins in Gegenwart von Pyridin" (Berlin, 1913; Z. für Phyziol Chemie)
- "Szerves kémia" (1952)
