= Glenwood Springs, Colorado =

City in Colorado, United States

- Home rule city
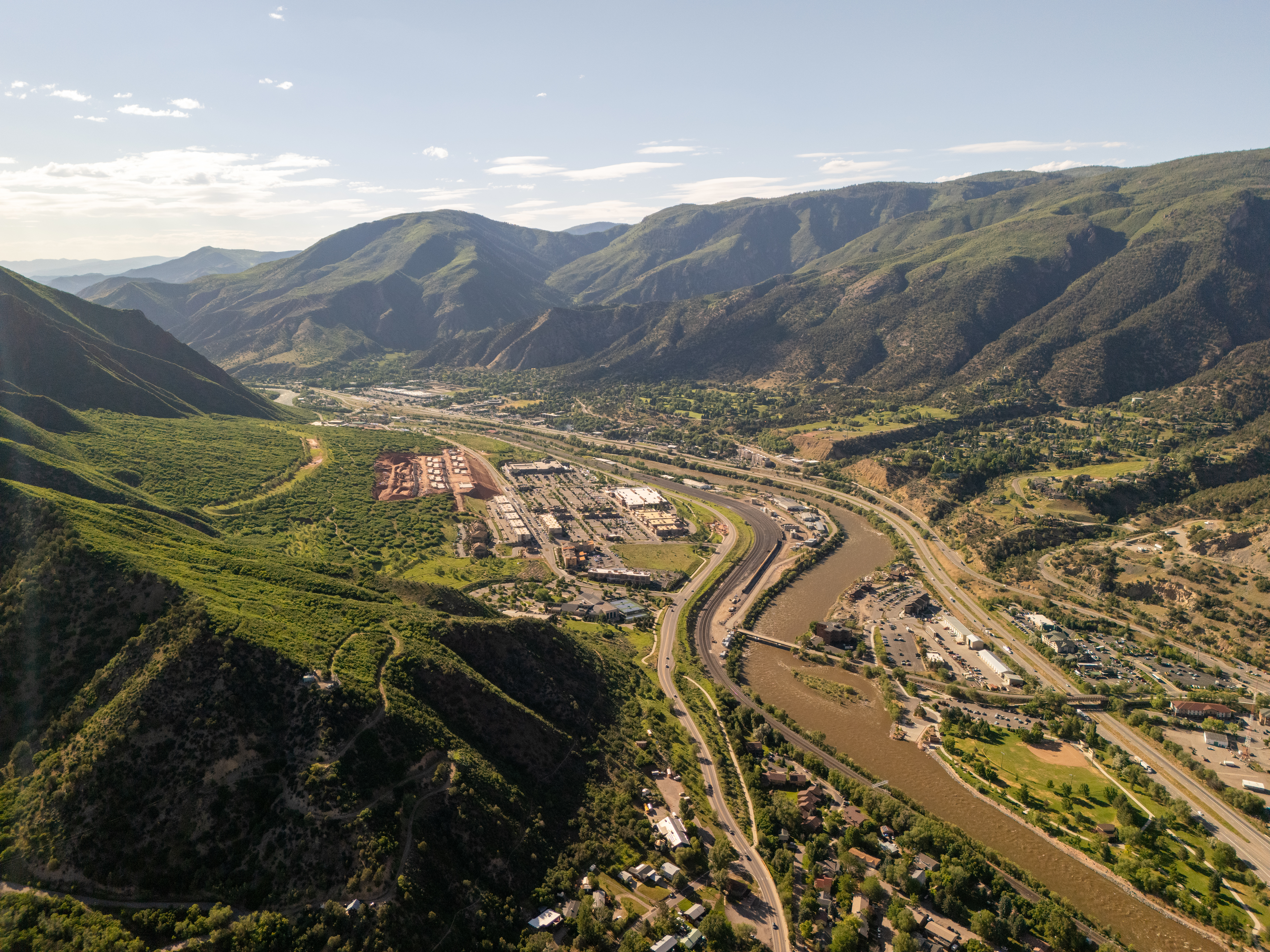
- Drone view of Glenwood Springs

- Flag Seal Logo
- Nickname: Spa in the Mountains
- Location of the City of Glenwood Springs in Garfield County, Colorado
- Coordinates: 39°32′44″N 107°20′05″W
- Country: United States
- State: Colorado
- County: Garfield
- Settled: 1883
- Incorporated: September 4, 1885

Government
  - Type: Home Rule Municipality

Area
  - Total: 5.844 sq mi (15.136 km^{2})
  - Land: 5.836 sq mi (15.114 km^{2})
  - Water: 0.0085 sq mi (0.022 km^{2})
- Elevation: 5,761 ft (1,756 m)

Population (2020)
  - Total: 9,963
  - Density: 1,707/sq mi (659/km^{2})
- Time zone: UTC−07:00 (MST)
  - Summer (DST): UTC−06:00 (MDT)
- ZIP code: 81601, 81602 (PO Box)
- Area codes: 970/748
- GNIS city ID: 2410605
- FIPS code: 08-30780
- Website: www.cogs.us

Glenwood Springs is a home rule municipality and the county seat of Garfield County, Colorado, United States. According to the 2020 United States census, the city has a population of 9,963. It is located at the confluence of the Roaring Fork River and the Colorado River, connecting the Roaring Fork Valley and a series of smaller towns on the Colorado River.

Glenwood Springs is known for its hot springs.

== History ==
For thousands of years, the area now known as Glenwood Springs has been inhabited by Indigenous people. The oral history of the Kapuuta and Mouache bands recall that Glenwood Springs is located within the traditional Nuuchiu tuvupu (The People's Land) of the Subuagan and Parianuche bands. Fred Conetah's History of the Northern Utes states that the Yampa or White River bands used the area, which is now in the Ute ancestral jurisdiction. The Utes were nomadic hunter-gatherers who seasonally used the natural hot springs in the area. The U.S. government surveyed the land in the mid-19th century, although they had no claim on the land. An 1868 treaty negotiated by the Tabeguache Ute Chief Ouray preserved the hunting grounds in the area of present-day Glenwood Springs.

Glenwood Springs was originally known as "Defiance" because its original white settlers squatted on the Ute Indian Reservation. Defiance was a camp of tents, saloons, and brothels. The Denver & Rio Grande, then a narrow-gauge railway arrived from the east in 1881, en route to Grand Junction.

Garfield County was created on February 10, 1883, with Carbonate as the county seat. The mining town of Carbonate was located high in the remote Flat Tops mountains. Isaac Cooper platted a legal settlement named Barlow at the confluence of the Roaring Fork River and the Grand River where Defiance had been, and the Barlow, Colorado, post office opened on June 25, 1883. Garfield County voters moved the county seat to the much more accessible Barlow later that year.

Isaac Cooper's wife Sarah had a hard time adjusting to the frontier life and, in an attempt to make her environment somewhat more comfortable, persuaded the founders to change the name of Barlow to Glenwood Springs, after her hometown of Glenwood, Iowa. The Barlow post office was renamed Glenwood Springs, Colorado, on March 28, 1884, and the Town of Glenwood Springs was incorporated on September 4, 1885.

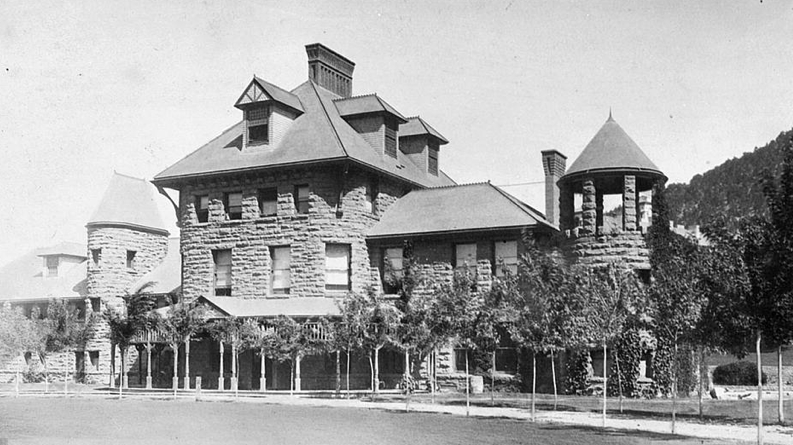
Glenwood Hot Springs Bathhouse, Glenwood Springs, built c. 1888

The location of Glenwood Springs, and its railroad stop, established a center of commerce in the area. The city has seen well-known visitors, including President Teddy Roosevelt, who spent a summer vacation living in the historic Hotel Colorado. Doc Holliday, who was known for the O.K. Corral gunfight, spent the final months of his life in Glenwood Springs and is buried in the town's original Pioneer Cemetery above Bennett Avenue. Kid Curry is buried in the same location.

Glenwood Springs was one of the first places in the United States to have electric lights. The original lighting was installed in 1897 inside of the Fairy Caves in Iron Mountain. Later, a dam was built on the Grand River in Glenwood Canyon, providing water for the Shoshone Hydroelectric Generating Station, which began producing power on May 16, 1909. On July 21, 1921, an Act of Congress changed the name of the Grand River to the Colorado River. The Shoshone plant retains some of the largest and oldest water rights on the upper Colorado River, the "Shoshone Call", which is valuable for the protection of Colorado River water rather than the minimal electricity produced.

The serial killer Ted Bundy was imprisoned in the Garfield County Jail until he escaped on the night of December 30, 1977, an escape which went undetected for 17 hours.

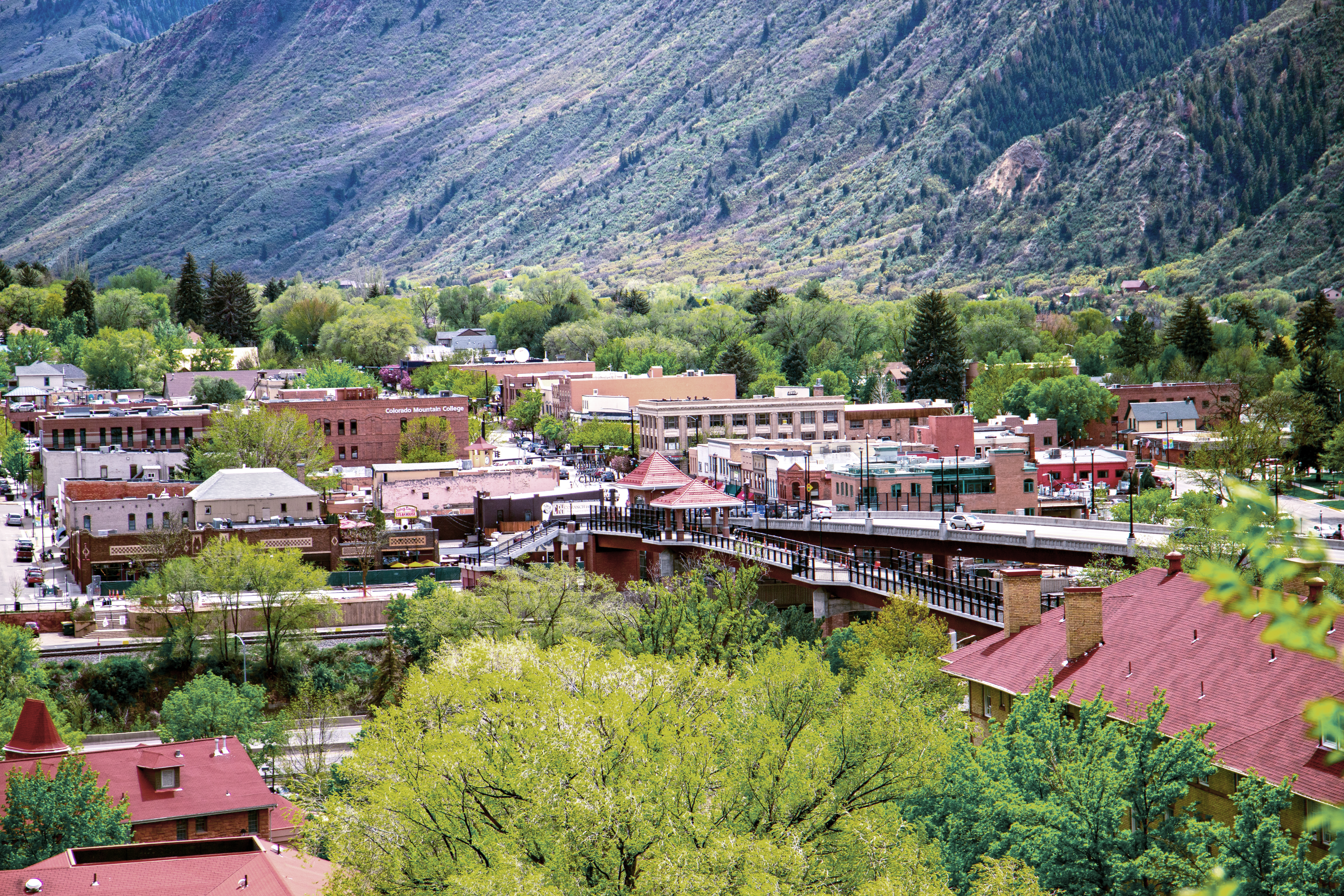
Grand Avenue, Glenwood Springs

== Geography ==
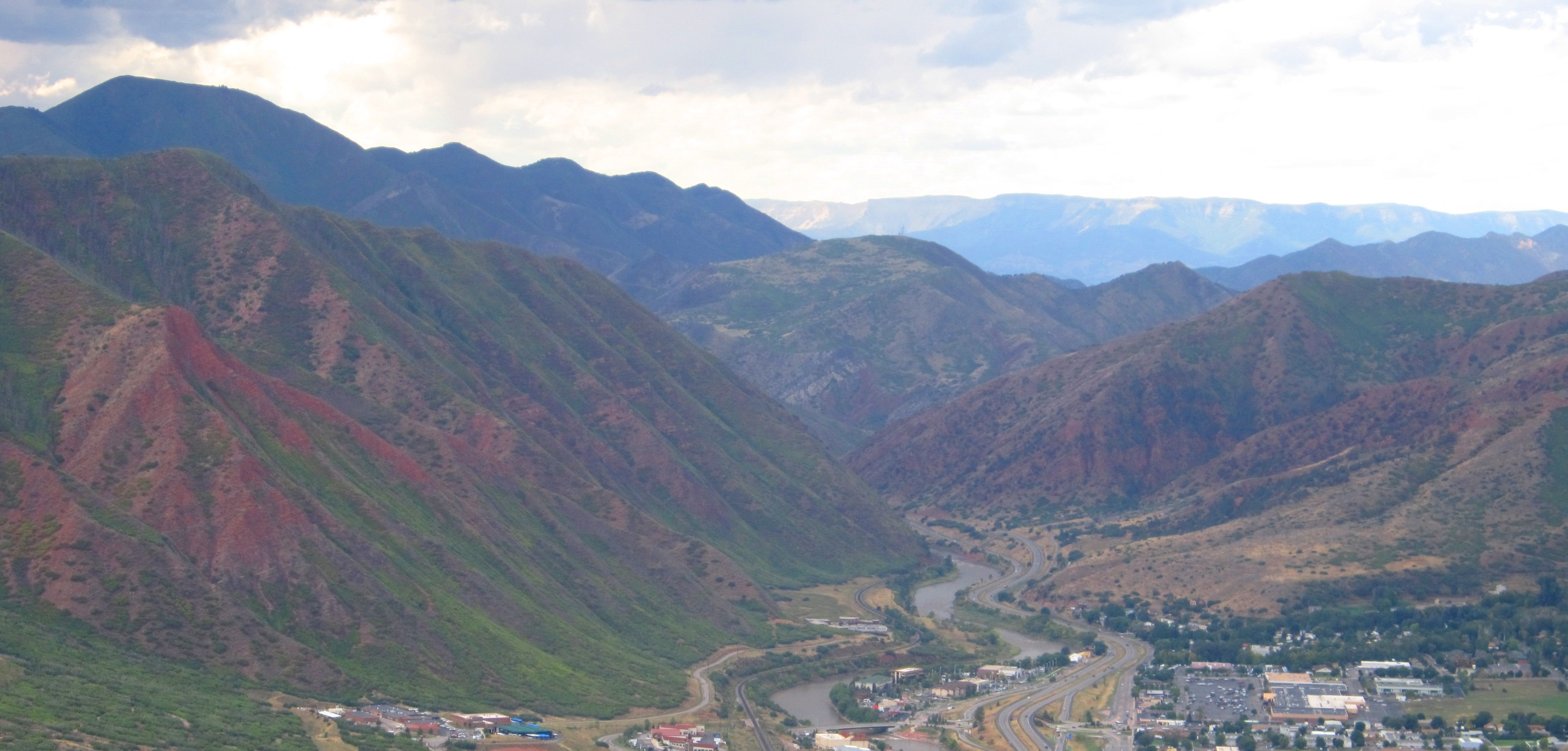
Looking west from Glenwood Caverns Adventure Park above Glenwood Springs

Glenwood Springs is located in the narrow mountain valleys that host the confluence of the Colorado River and the Roaring Fork River. The surrounding terrain is steeply contoured on all sides, containing several caves. The geology of the area includes geothermal activity, such as the local hot springs, but it is also evidenced through other features such as the Dotsero maar. Occasional proposals to leverage the geothermal energy for other purposes arise. Glenwood Springs has experienced several mudslides throughout its history, a threat mitigated somewhat by public works.

Glenwood Springs is considered a walkable town by PBS and Walking Magazine, included in the Walking Town Hall of Fame. Though the town's geography makes it a natural environment for pedestrians and cyclists, there are also trails running throughout and around the city that resulted from planning efforts that began in the 1980s in response to congestion and traffic.

Due to civic planning during the early years of the city, Glenwood Springs owns some senior water rights to tributaries of the Colorado River. Glenwood Springs water supply is sufficient for its population, unlike some areas of the American West, conservation plans have been enacted anyway for largely environmental reasons. The town's drinking water is supplied primarily through senior rights to major watersheds in the Flat Tops Wilderness Area, and the tap water is generally of safe quality.

Mineral deposits exist further up the Crystal River and in the Roaring Fork area, and petroleum resources are ample in western Garfield County, which brings tax revenue to Glenwood Springs. However, the town itself lies outside of the Colorado Mineral Belt, and there are no mineral or oil and gas sources near Glenwood Springs proper or its watersheds. While the paucity of minerals and oil was disastrous for early miners hoping to strike it rich, modern Glenwood Springs has none of the typical Colorado mountain town legacy of resource extraction, generally good air quality, water, and land. However, valley inversions and heavy traffic to Aspen can lead to air quality problems during exceptionally cold spells of winter.

At the 2020 United States census, the city had a total area of 3,740 acres (15.136 km^{2}), including 5.4 acres (0.022 km^{2}) of water.

=== Climate ===
Glenwood Springs has a generally continental steppe climate, much more consistently stable than that of the Front Range and most of Colorado, though still decidedly continental and prone to periods of extreme weather. Microclimates dominate Glenwood Springs, with areas close to the rivers often much more damp and cool than hillsides.

Climate data for Glenwood Springs (1981–2010 normals, extremes 1893–present)
Month	Jan	Feb	Mar	Apr	May	Jun	Jul	Aug	Sep	Oct	Nov	Dec	Year
Record high °F (°C)	60 (16)	67 (19)	79 (26)	88 (31)	95 (35)	102 (39)	102 (39)	100 (38)	100 (38)	88 (31)	80 (27)	65 (18)	102 (39)
Mean daily maximum °F (°C)	35.5 (1.9)	41 (5)	51.5 (10.8)	59.4 (15.2)	69.8 (21.0)	81 (27)	87.3 (30.7)	85.1 (29.5)	76.2 (24.6)	63.8 (17.7)	47.2 (8.4)	35.4 (1.9)	61.2 (16.2)
Mean daily minimum °F (°C)	13.4 (−10.3)	18.5 (−7.5)	26.6 (−3.0)	32.1 (0.1)	39.2 (4.0)	46 (8)	52.8 (11.6)	52 (11)	43.6 (6.4)	33.2 (0.7)	23.9 (−4.5)	14.9 (−9.5)	33.1 (0.6)
Record low °F (°C)	−38 (−39)	−30 (−34)	−14 (−26)	2 (−17)	17 (−8)	27 (−3)	30 (−1)	28 (−2)	20 (−7)	10 (−12)	−12 (−24)	−22 (−30)	−38 (−39)
Average precipitation inches (mm)	1.49 (38)	1.1 (28)	1.42 (36)	1.52 (39)	1.79 (45)	1.07 (27)	1.07 (27)	1.27 (32)	1.95 (50)	1.85 (47)	1.34 (34)	1.28 (33)	17.15 (436)
Average snowfall inches (cm)	17.9 (45)	11.2 (28)	6.6 (17)	1.8 (4.6)	0.3 (0.76)	0 (0)	0 (0)	0 (0)	0 (0)	1.1 (2.8)	5.3 (13)	14.9 (38)	59.3 (151)
Average precipitation days (≥ 0.01 in)	8	7	8	8	7	5	6	8	7	6	6	8	84
Source: WRCC (temperature and precipitation data 1981–2010, snowfall 1893–2012)

== Demographics ==
Historical population
Census	Pop.	Note	%±
1890	920		—
1900	1,350		46.7%
1910	2,019		49.6%
1920	2,073		2.7%
1930	1,825		−12.0%
1940	2,253		23.5%
1950	2,412		7.1%
1960	3,637		50.8%
1970	4,106		12.9%
1980	4,637		12.9%
1990	6,561		41.5%
2000	7,736		17.9%
2010	9,614		24.3%
2020	9,963		3.6%
U.S. Decennial Census

Glenwood Springs is the principal city of the Glenwood Springs, CO Micropolitan Statistical Area.

=== 2020 census ===
As of the 2020 census, Glenwood Springs had a population of 9,963. The median age was 37.4 years. 21.9% of residents were under the age of 18 and 14.2% of residents were 65 years of age or older. For every 100 females there were 101.6 males, and for every 100 females age 18 and over there were 101.3 males age 18 and over.

99.6% of residents lived in urban areas, while 0.4% lived in rural areas.

There were 3,916 households in Glenwood Springs, of which 31.0% had children under the age of 18 living in them. Of all households, 43.1% were married-couple households, 21.9% were households with a male householder and no spouse or partner present, and 26.0% were households with a female householder and no spouse or partner present. About 28.9% of all households were made up of individuals and 9.9% had someone living alone who was 65 years of age or older.

There were 4,276 housing units, of which 8.4% were vacant. The homeowner vacancy rate was 1.2% and the rental vacancy rate was 4.4%.

Racial composition as of the 2020 census
Race	Number	Percent
White	6,357	63.8%
Black or African American	65	0.7%
American Indian and Alaska Native	115	1.2%
Asian	114	1.1%
Native Hawaiian and Other Pacific Islander	3	0.0%
Some other race	1,829	18.4%
Two or more races	1,480	14.9%
Hispanic or Latino (of any race)	3,532	35.5%

=== 2000 census ===
As of the 2000 census, there were 7,736 people, 3,216 households, and 1,926 families residing in the city. The population density was 1,611 inhabitants per square mile (622/km^{2}). There were 3,353 housing units at an average density of 698.5 units per square mile (269.7 units/km^{2}). The racial makeup of the city was 90.42% White, 0.23% African American, 0.71% Native American, 0.8% Asian, 0.08% Pacific Islander, 5.82% from other races, and 1.94% from two or more races. Hispanic or Latino people of any race were 13.3% of the population. 13.9% were of German, 13.3% English, 12.9% Irish, 7.6% American and 7% Italian ancestry according to Census 2000.

There were 3,216 households, out of which 30% had children under the age of 18 living with them, 47.7% were married couples living together, 8.5% had a female householder with no husband present, and 40.1% were non-families. 29.7% of all households were made up of individuals, and 8.5% had someone living alone who was 65 years of age or older. The average household size was 2.37 and the average family size was 2.97.

In the city, the population was spread out, with 23.1% under the age of 18, 9.5% from 18 to 24, 33.3% from 25 to 44, 24.9% from 45 to 64, and 9.2% who were 65 years of age or older. The median age was 36 years. For every 100 females, there were 103.5 males. For every 100 females age 18 and over, there were 100.7 males.

The median income for a household in the city was $43,934, and the median income for a family was $52,903. Males had a median income of $38,506 versus $29,272 for females. The per capita income for the city was $23,449. About 3.5% of families and 7.9% of the population were below the poverty line, including 6% of those under age 18 and 5.5% of those age 65 or over.

Despite being an expensive area in which to live, Glenwood Springs has the highest life expectancy in America for 40-year-olds making working wages.

== Economy ==
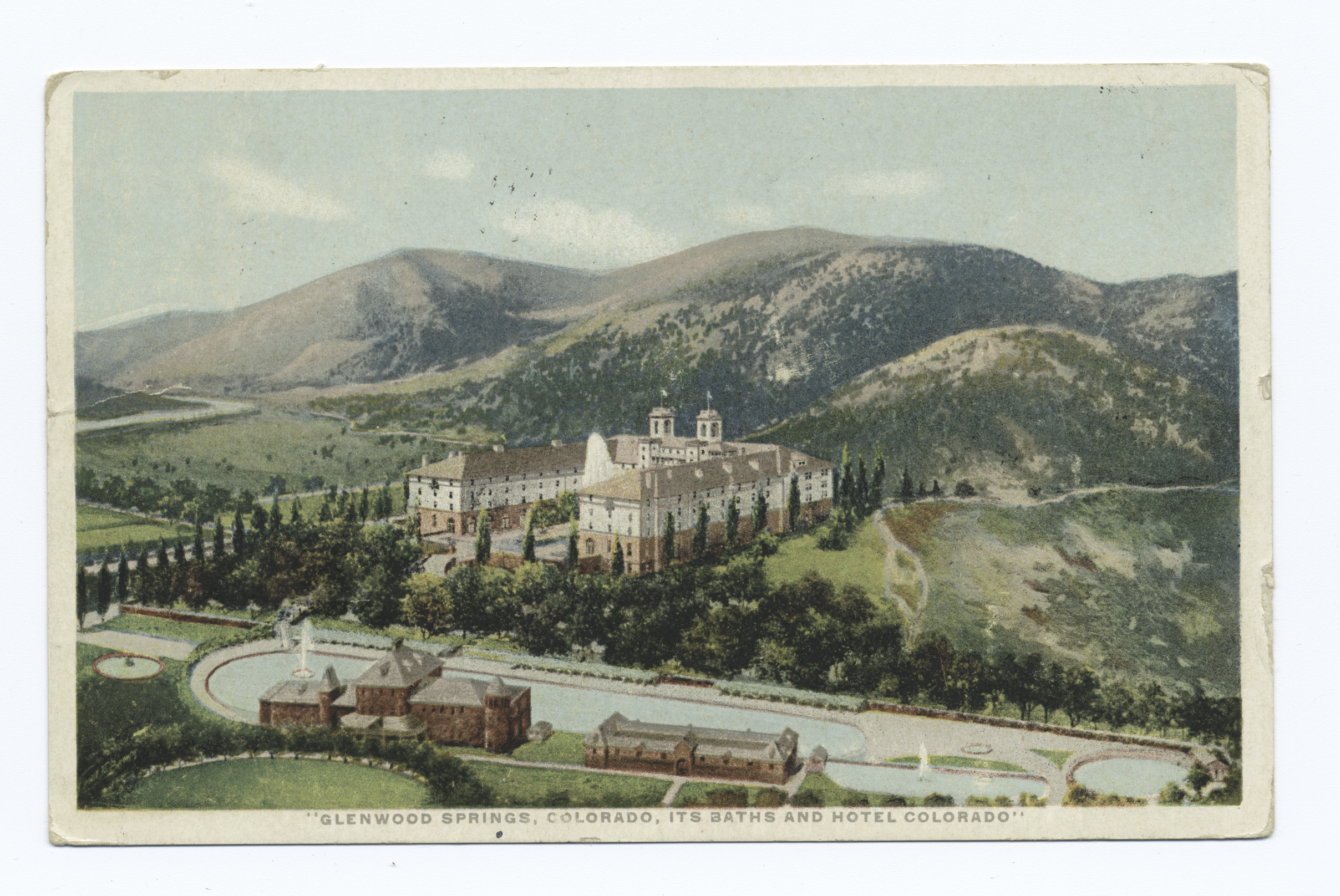
Historical image of Glenwood Springs, Colorado, its baths and Hotel Colorado

Glenwood does not primarily serve as a bedroom community. In 2020, it received stimulus money. Due to severe geographic constraints, if further population growth is to be accommodated, it must come primarily from multifamily infill development.

Bloomberg Business named Glenwood Springs the seventh wealthiest small town in America in 2015, due principally to the influence of Aspen. Glenwood Springs and Aspen share a micropolitan statistical area, and businesses often serve the entire Valley. Many small businesses start in the area due to the ambient wealth and a strong preference for local business, but they typically relocate to larger metropolitan areas after successful growth leads to needs for more affordable labor and physical resources.

A ranch located in Glenwood Springs produces Red Delicious apples.

=== Top Employers ===
As of the city's 2023 Annual Comprehensive Financial Report, Glenwood Springs' top employers are:

#	Employer	Employee Range
1	Valley View Hospital	1,000 - 1,250
2	Walmart	250 - 499
3	Lowe's Home Improvement	250 - 499
4	City Market	250 - 499
5	Target	250 - 499
6	Colorado Mountain College	250 - 499
7	Roaring Fork School District RE-1	100 - 249
8	Glenwood Hot Springs Resort	100 - 249
9	Glenwood Caverns Adventure Park	100 - 249
10	City of Glenwood Springs	100 - 249

== Arts and culture ==
Strawberry Days Festival, founded in 1898, is Colorado's oldest festival, and the oldest continuously held civic celebration west of the Mississippi River.

== Parks and recreation ==
=== Hot springs ===
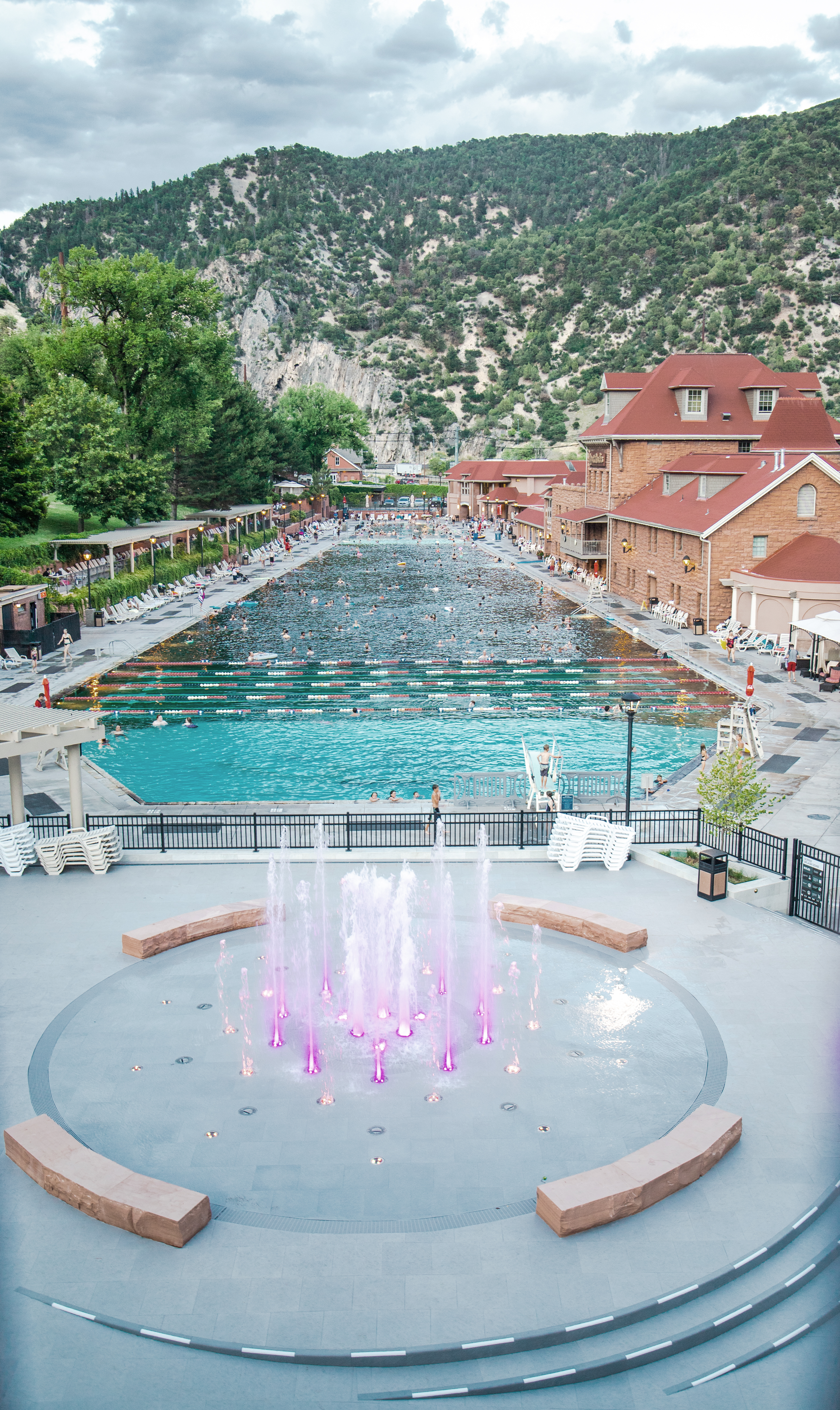
A hot springs pool in Glenwood Springs

There are numerous hot springs in the area, including several facilities in town that range from 93 to 104 °F (34 to 40 °C) with varying mineral content. Native Americans believe the springs had medicinal and magical qualities, and prior to 1800, the Utes believed the springs were sacred.

Yampah Hot Springs vapor caves are underground geothermal steam baths, historically used by the Ute people as a source of rejuvenation and healing. The vapor caves consist of three connecting rock chambers, and temperatures average 110 to 112 °F (43 to 44 °C).

Iron Mountain Hot Springs features mineral water soaking pools.

=== Water sports ===
Glenwood Springs is noted for its fishing. There is a dedicated Glenwood Whitewater Park.

=== Bike trails ===
Two bike trails end at Glenwood. The Glenwood Canyon Recreational Trail winds 16 miles (26 km) through Glenwood Canyon. The Rio Grande Trail runs roughly 41 miles (66 km) along the former local Denver and Rio Grande Western Railroad, to Aspen.

=== Glenwood Caverns ===
Glenwood Caverns Adventure Park is an amusement park located near Glenwood Springs.

=== Glenwood Vaudeville Revue ===
The Glenwood Vaudeville Revue, founded in 2009, performs a dinner theater show in a renovated downtown movie theater.

== Education ==
=== K-12 education ===
Public education is administered by the Roaring Fork School District RE-1. Schools located in Glenwood Springs include:

- Glenwood Springs Elementary School
- Sopris Elementary School
- Riverview School
- Glenwood Springs Middle School
- Glenwood Springs High School

St. Stephen Catholic School (of the Roman Catholic Archdiocese of Denver) offers an K-8 school curriculum. Also located in Glenwood Springs is Yampah Mountain School, which offers alternative education.

=== Higher education ===
Colorado Mountain College is headquartered in Glenwood Springs, and maintains two campuses in the city: a commuter campus in downtown Glenwood Springs, and the Spring Valley residential campus just south of the city. In 2022, CMC Glenwood Springs enrolled 1,908 students, while CMC Spring Valley enrolled 810 students.

The University of Denver maintains its Western Colorado Master of Social Work program in Glenwood Springs. This program specifically focuses on training students to be social workers in rural communities.

== Media ==
Glenwood Springs' principal news source is the Post Independent, a local daily newspaper created by the merger of the Glenwood Post, with a history stretching back in various forms to 1889, and a newer competitor, the Glenwood Independent. It has received numerous awards over the years, including the 2016 American Society of News Editors' Osborne Award for Editorial Leadership. The newspaper and many of its reporters have been recognized by the Colorado Associated Press for a variety of distinctions.

KMTS provides local country radio along the Colorado River, and KSNO-FM serves the Roaring Fork Valley.

The town is also served by local television KREG-TV, alongside K42EV-D, a translator of Grand Junction ABC affiliate KJCT-LP and K32NO-D, a repeater of Rocky Mountain PBS.

== Infrastructure ==
=== Transportation ===
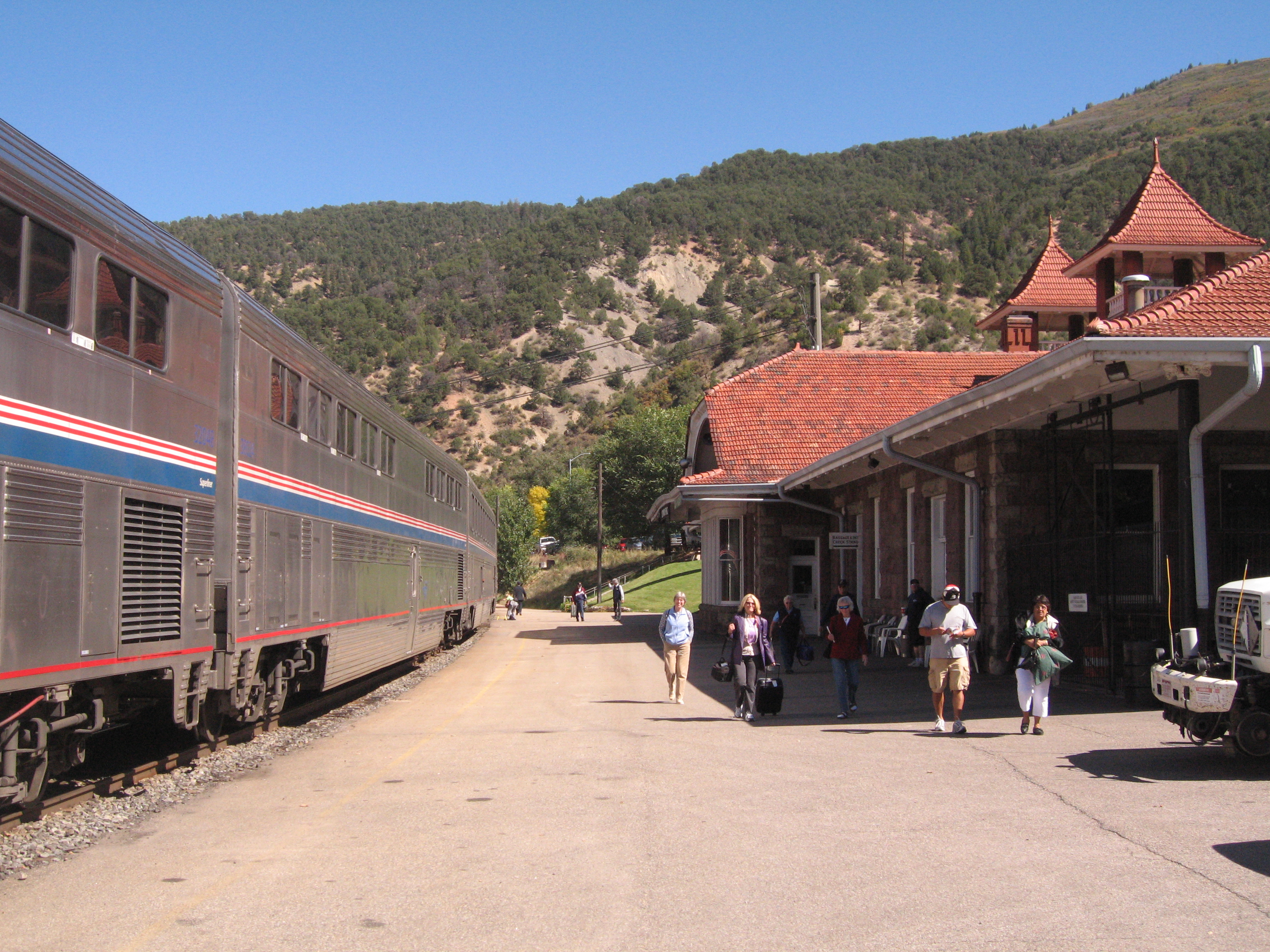
The Glenwood Springs train station, run by Amtrak

==== Railroad ====
The Union Pacific Railroad provides freight service. BNSF also has trackage rights on this line, with several trains of both companies passing through daily.

Amtrak's California Zephyr, operating daily in both directions between Chicago and Emeryville, California, serves Glenwood Springs, the second busiest station in Colorado, behind only Denver's Union Station. The first commercially successful dome cars were built for the Zephyr family, inspired by Glenwood Canyon.

Starting in August 2021, the Canada-based luxury rail excursion company Rocky Mountaineer has provided direct passenger rail service between Moab, Utah and Denver, Colorado (with an overnight stop in Glenwood Springs, Colorado) on its Rockies to the Red Rocks route.

The local transportation authority is Roaring Fork Transportation Authority (RFTA, pronounced "rafta"). RFTA retains ownership of the land previously used for rail traffic to Aspen, a source of occasional consternation in balancing development needs. Proposals to introduce light rail to the valley remain unrealized but were not found economically feasible. VelociRFTA service described below currently serves that role, but RFTA remains committed to realizing the light-rail vision.

==== Bus ====
RFTA provides bus transit in Glenwood Springs and throughout the Roaring Fork Valley. VelociRFTA (pronounced "Veloci-rafta", a pun on velociraptor) BRT service, the first rural BRT in the United States, began in September 2013, offering connections between south Glenwood Springs and Aspen roughly every 15 minutes with a 60-minute total travel time. Timetables vary by season, with different frequencies offered during spring, summer, autumn, and winter, to accommodate shifting seasonal demands.

The city also operates an intracity bus service, Ride Glenwood. Ride Glenwood offers a main route from the west side of town along the 6&24 corridor, through downtown, to the south part of Glenwood along Hwy 82.

Greyhound Lines stops in Glenwood Springs on trips between New York City and Las Vegas twice per day.

Bus service is provided twice daily by Bustang and runs from Glenwood Springs to both Grand Junction and Denver.

==== Automobile ====
Glenwood Springs lies along I-70 at exit 116 (main exit), about 150 miles (240 km) west of Denver and 85 miles (137 km) east of Grand Junction. I-70 is one of the main east–west routes through the Rocky Mountains. Colorado State Highway 82 leads southeast from Glenwood Springs up the Roaring Fork Valley 12 miles (19 km) to Carbondale and 41 miles (66 km) to Aspen.

==== Airport ====
Glenwood Springs Airport is a municipal airport built in the early 1940s.

== Notable people ==
- Louis Alterie (1886–1935), Chicago gangster involved in a gang shootout in Glenwood Springs
- Brady Corbet (born 1988), director and actor
- Alice McKennis Duran (born 1989), skier
- Jeanne Golay (born 1962), bike racer, 2-time Olympian and gold medalist
- William Grandstaff (died 1901), African-American frontiersman
- Sacha Gros (born 1974), alpine skier
- Justin Hocking (born 1973), writer
- Doc Holliday (1851–1887), Wild West gunfighter, gambler, and dentist
- Jeremy Hubbard (born 1972), news anchor
- James Irwin (1930–1991), U.S. Air Force colonel and NASA astronaut
- Elizabeth Jaranyi (1918–1998), Holocaust survivor
- Jack P. Juhan (1904–2002), U.S. Marine Corps major general
- Bobby Julich (born 1971), bike racer and silver medalist
- Benjamin Kunkel (born 1972), novelist and political economist
- Harvey Logan (1867–1904), Wild West outlaw and gunman
- Berenice Mallory (1901–1997), home economist, educator, federal official
- Scott McInnis (born 1953), former U.S. congressman from Colorado
- Blake Paul Neubert (born 1981), painter
- Clifford C. Parks (1860–1937), politician
- Sarah Schleper (born 1979), alpine skier
- Edward T. Taylor (1858–1941), politician
- Ledyard Tucker (1910–2004), mathematician
- John D. Vanderhoof (1922–2013), 37th governor of Colorado
- Francis Whitaker (1906–1999), blacksmith

== See also ==
- Glenwood Springs, CO Micropolitan Statistical Area
- Glenwood Canyon
