= Leopold Wittelshöfer =

Austrian physician

Leopold Wittelshöfer (14 July 1818, Nagykanizsa, Hungary – 8 January 1889, Vienna, Austria) was an Austrian medical doctor.

He was educated at the University of Vienna (M.D. 1841). After practising medicine for ten years in Raab, Hungary, he moved to Vienna (1851) and became editor of the "Wiener Medizinische Wochenschrift", to which periodical he contributed many essays. He was also the author of "Wiener Heil- und Humanitätsanstalten" Vienna, 1856.
