= Prešov Region =

Region of Slovakia

Prešov Region Prešovský Kraj
- Region
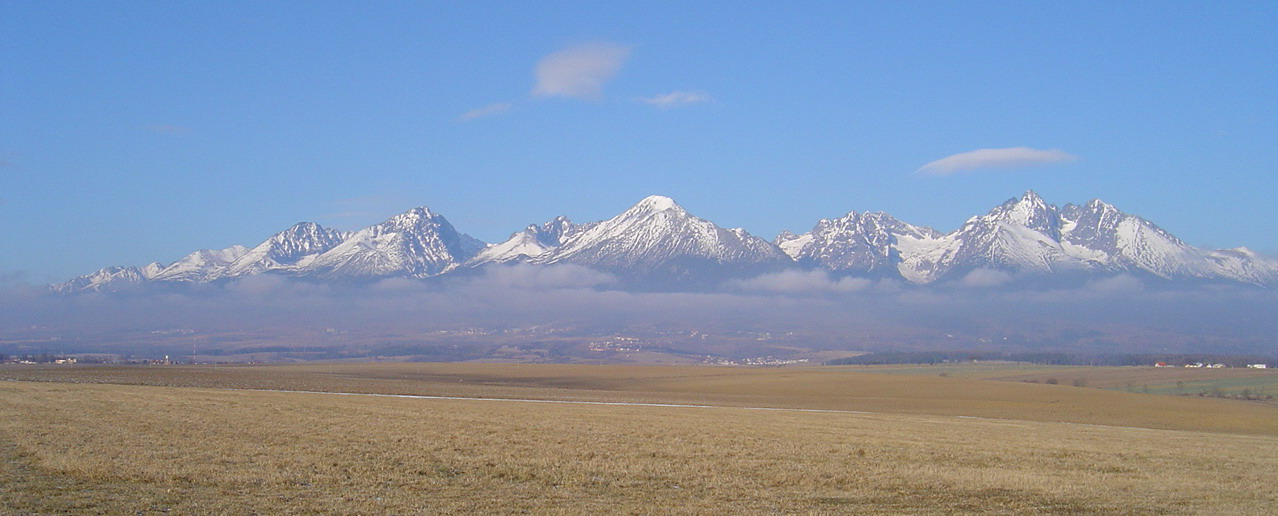
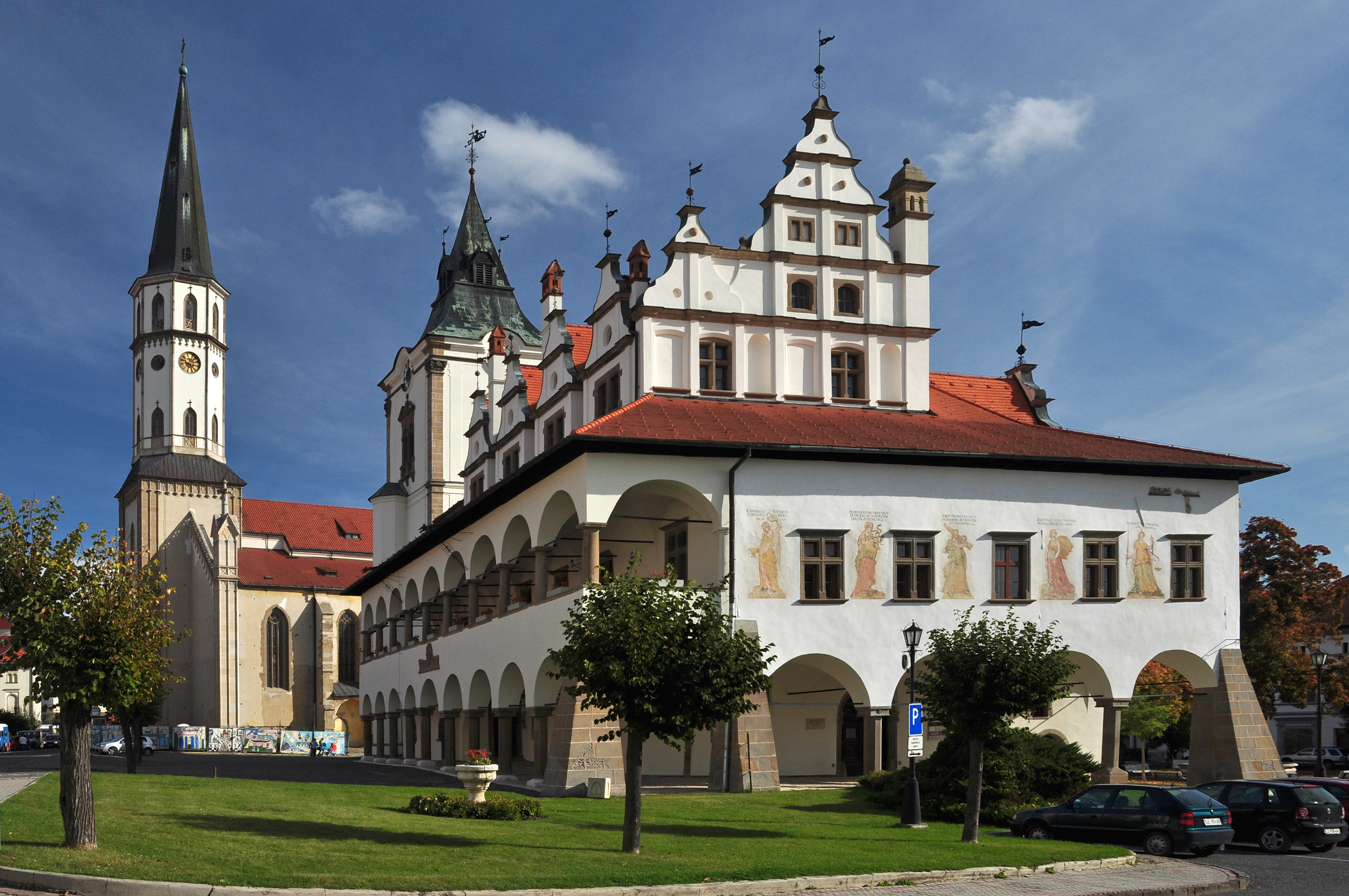
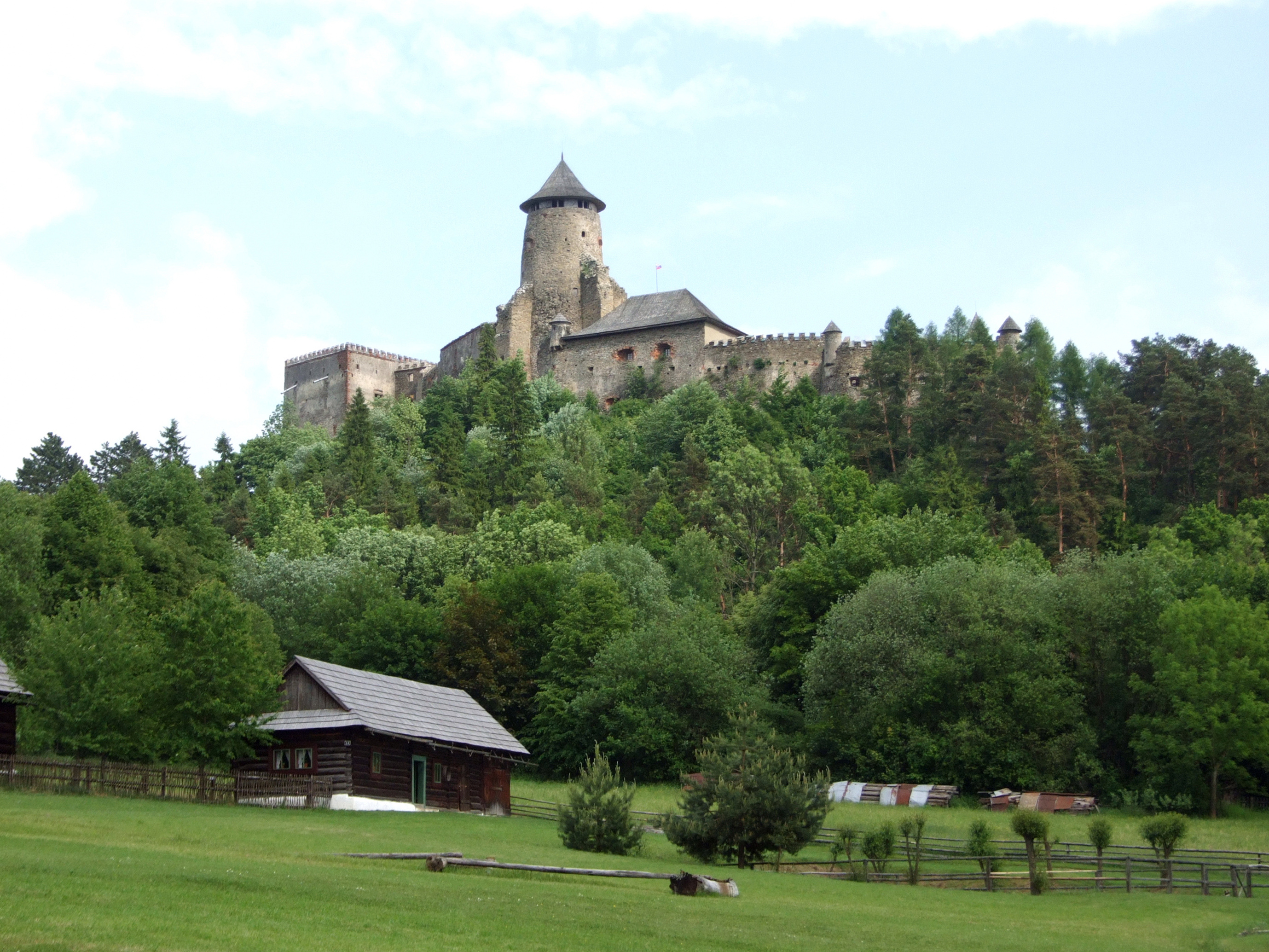
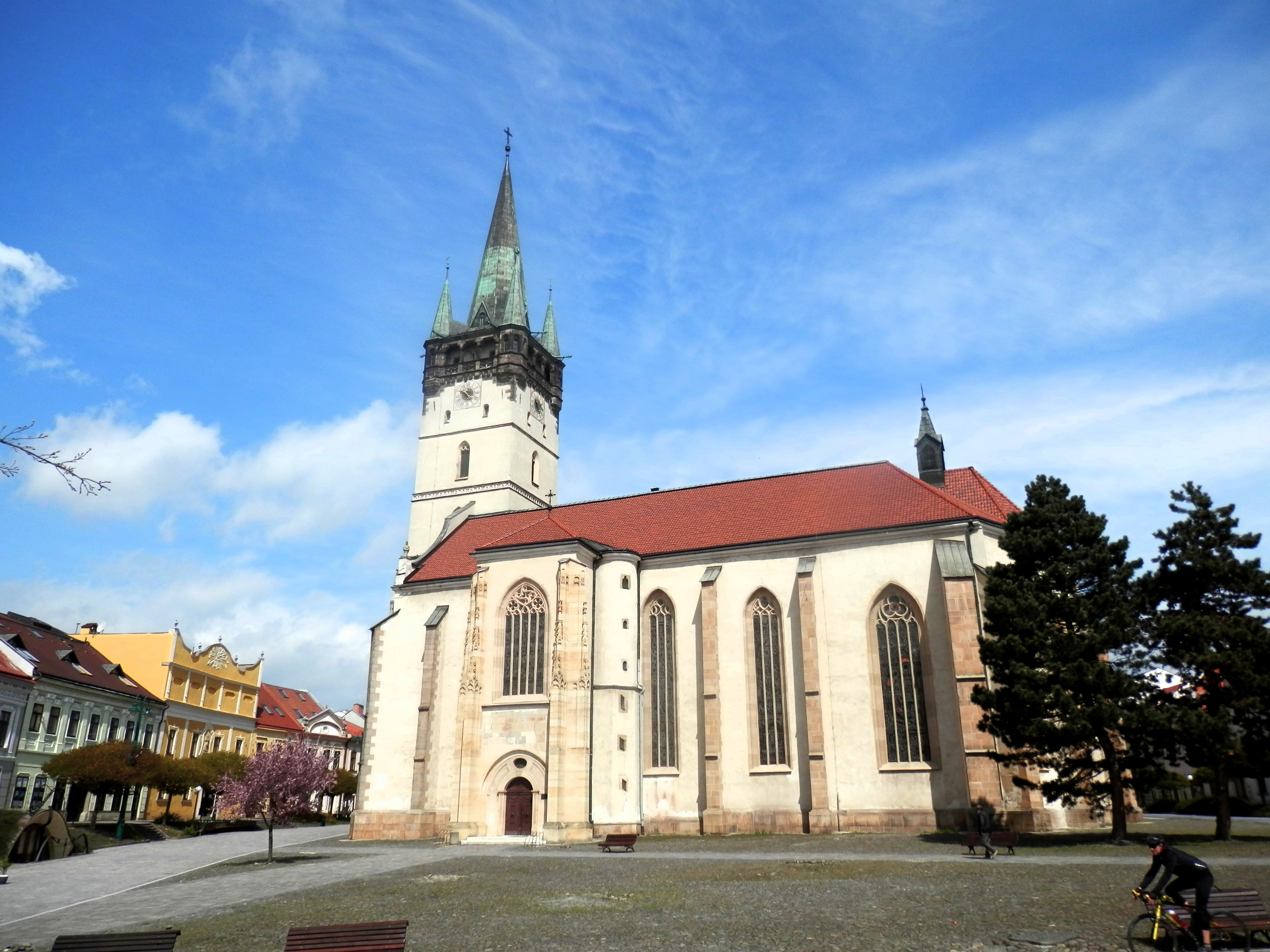
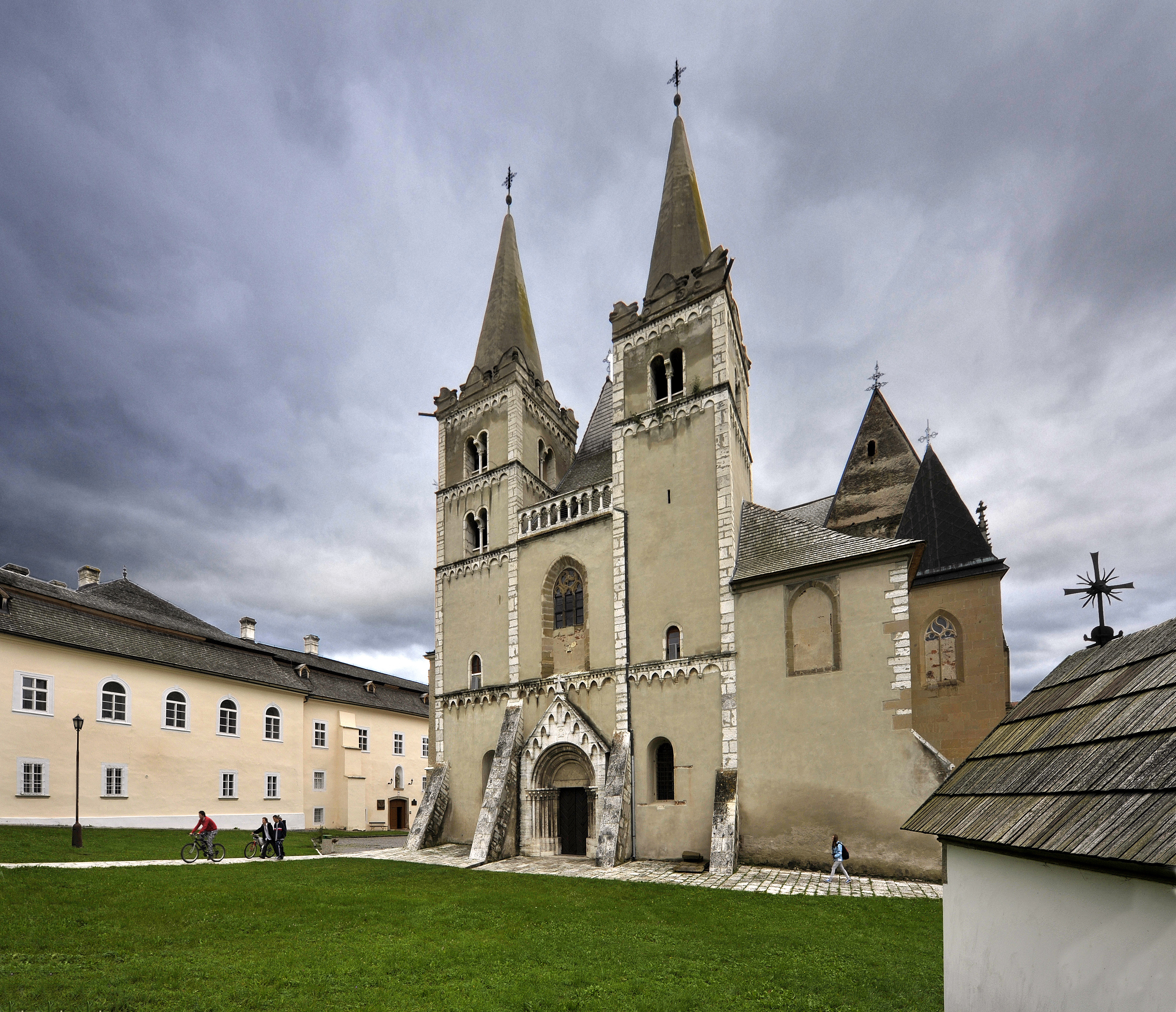
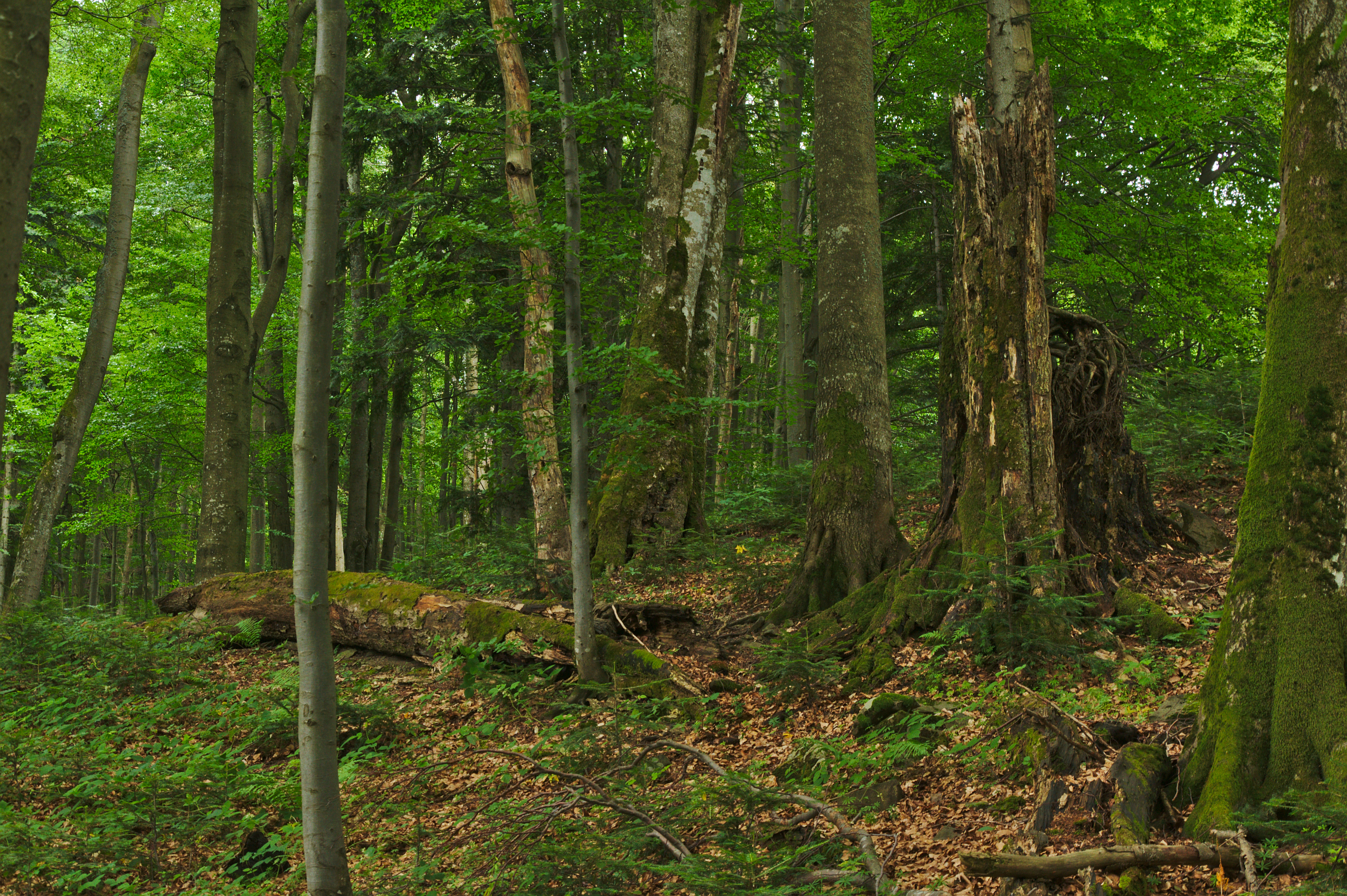
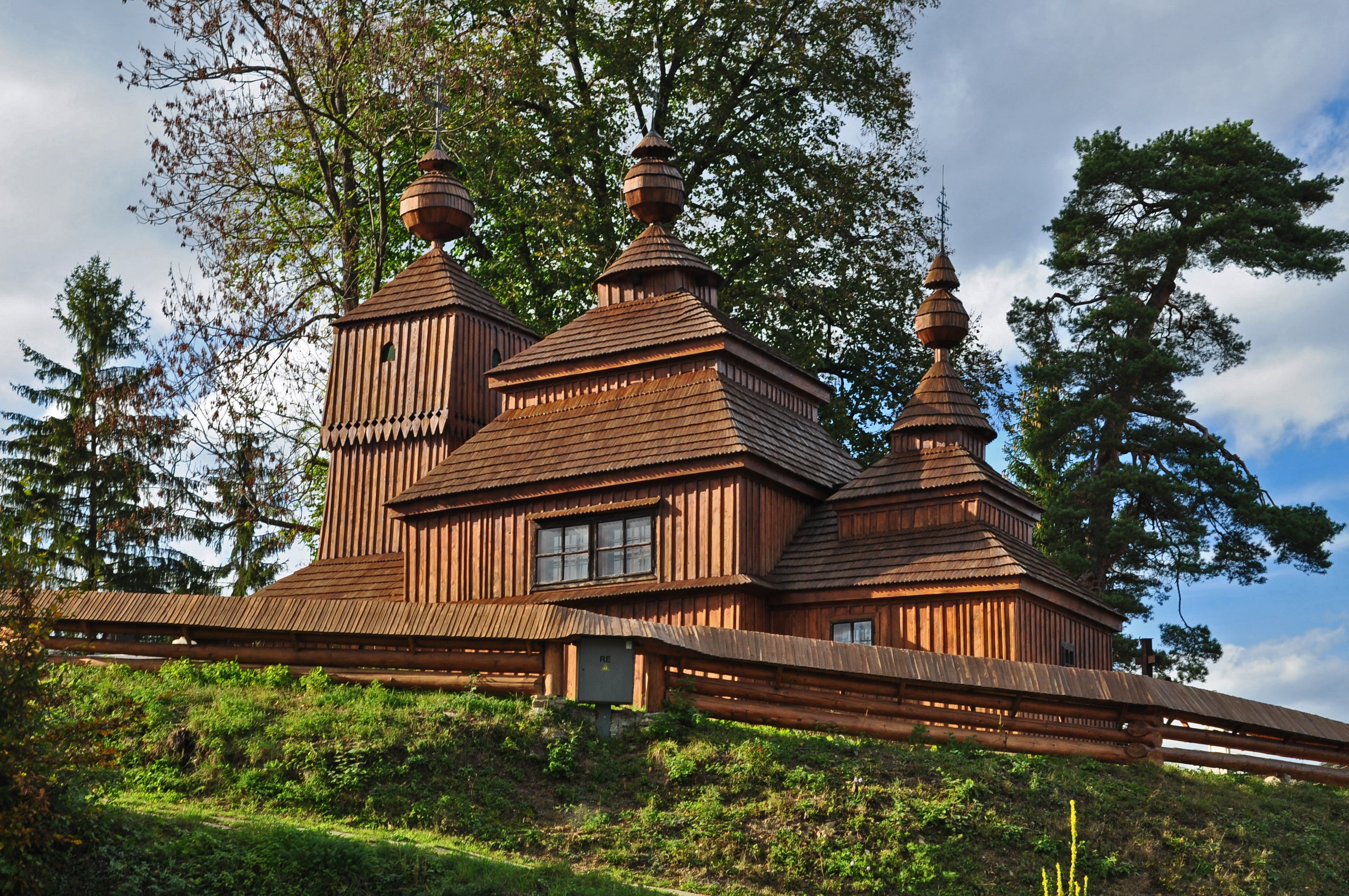
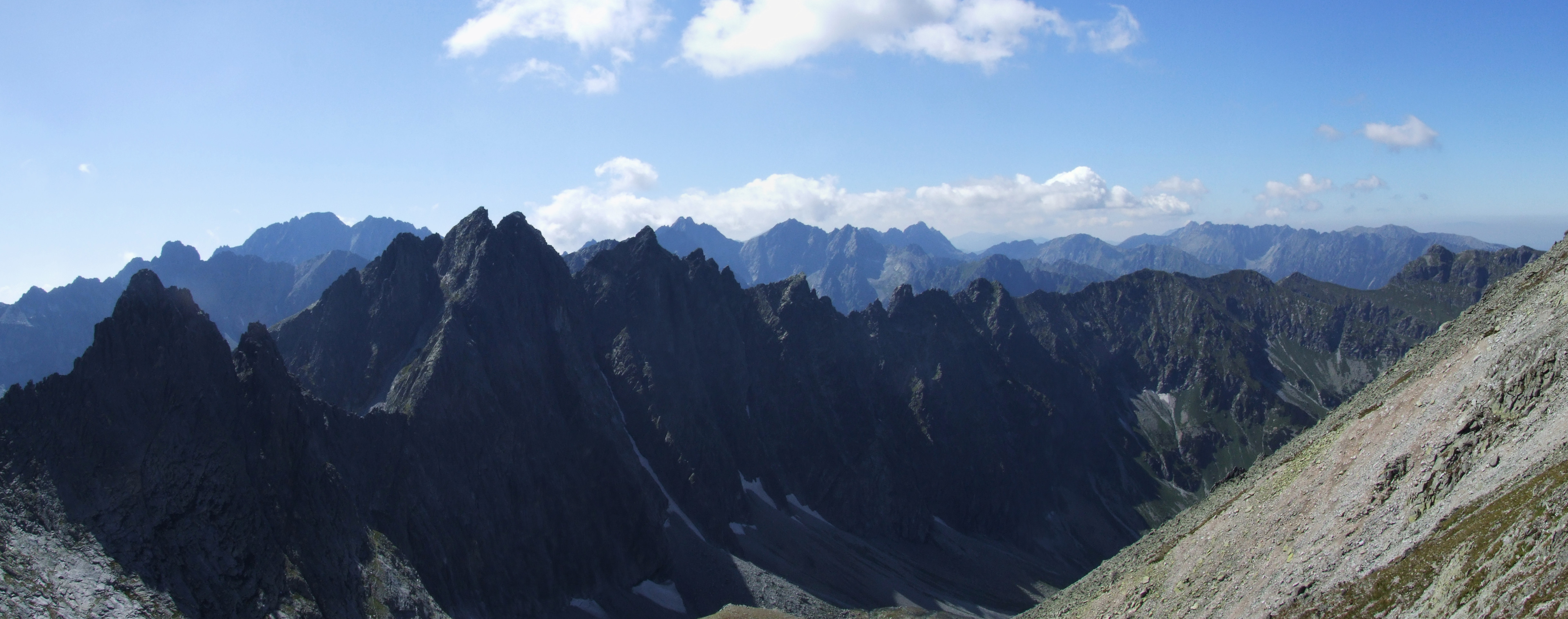
- From the top to bottom-left; High Tatras, Levoča, Stará Ľubovňa, Co-Cathedral of Saint Nicholas in Prešov, Spišská Kapitula, Stužica primeval forest, Bodružal, Sedielko mountain pass in High Tatras

- Flag Coat of arms

- Prešov Region
- Country: Slovakia
- Capital: Prešov

Government
  - Body: County Council of Prešov Region
  - Governor: Milan Majerský (KDH)

Area
  - Total: 8,972.65 km^{2} (3,464.36 sq mi)
- Highest elevation: 2,654 m (8,707 ft)
- Lowest elevation: 105 m (344 ft)

Population (2025)
  - Total: 810,075

GDP
  - Total: €7.451 billion (2016)
  - Per capita: €9,070 (2016)
- Time zone: UTC+1 (CET)
  - Summer (DST): UTC+2 (CEST)
- ISO 3166 code: SK-PV
- Website: www.po-kraj.sk/sk/

The Prešov Region (Slovak: Prešovský kraj, pronounced [ˈpreʂɔwskiː ˈkraj]; Hungarian: Eperjesi kerület) (Ukrainian: Пряшівський край, pronounced [ˈprʲɑʃiu̯sʲkɪj ˈkrɑj]), is one of the eight Slovak administrative regions and consists of 13 districts (okresy) and 666 municipalities, 23 of which have town status. The region was established in 1996 and is the most populous of all the regions in Slovakia. Its administrative center is the city of Prešov.

== Geography ==
It is located in the north-eastern Slovakia and has an area of 8972.65 km^{2}. The region has a predominantly mountainous landscape. The subdivisions of Tatras – High Tatras and Belianske Tatras lie almost entirely in the region and include the highest point of Slovakia – Gerlachovský štít (2,654 ASL). Other mountain ranges and highlands in the region are Šarišská vrchovina, Čergov, Ondavská vrchovina, Slanské vrchy, Pieniny, Levoča Hills, Laborecká vrchovina, Bukovské vrchy, Vihorlat Mountains and Eastern Slovak Lowland. The basins in Prešov Region are Podtatranská kotlina, Hornádska kotlina and Košice Basin.

Major rivers in the region include the Poprad in the west, which is the only major Slovak river in the Baltic Sea watershed, a small part of Hornád in the south-west, a small part of Dunajec in the north, the Torysa in the centre and the Ondava and Laborec in the east. As for administrative divisions, the region borders on the Lesser Poland and Subcarpathian voivodeships in Poland in the north, Zakarpattia Oblast of Ukraine in the east, Košice Region in the south, Banská Bystrica Region in the south-west and Žilina Region in the west.

== Population ==
Historical population
Year	Pop.	±%
1970	605,772	—
1980	678,386	+12.0%
1991	739,264	+9.0%
2001	789,968	+6.9%
2011	814,527	+3.1%
2021	808,931	−0.7%
Source: Censuses

Population statistic (10 years)
Year	1995	2005	2015	2025
Count	768,719	798,596	820,697	810,075
Difference		+3.88%	+2.76%	−1.29%

Population statistic
Year	2024	2025
Count	810,008	810,075
Difference		+0.00%

It has a population of 810,075 people (31 December 2025).

The population density in the region is 90.28/km^{2} (233.8/sq mi) (2025), which is below the country's average (110 per km^{2}). The largest towns are Prešov, Poprad, Humenné, Bardejov and Snina.

=== Ethnicity ===
Census 2021 (1+ %)
Ethnicity	Number	Fraction
Slovak	733,064	90.62%
Romani	65,161	8.05%
Rusyn	49,804	6.15%
Not found out	44,783	5.53%
Total	808,931	

In year 2021 was 808,931 people by ethnicity 733,064 as Slovak, 65,161 as Romani, 49,804 as Rusyn, 44,783 as Not found out, 4270 as Czech, 3456 as Ukrainian, 2100 as Other, 1298 as Polish, 1197 as Hungarian, 1062 as German, 892 as Russian, 274 as English, 272 as Vietnamese, 238 as Italian, 137 as Moravian, 136 as Jewish, 134 as Irish, 108 as Chinese, 108 as Canadian, 101 as Bulgarian, 97 as Austrian, 93 as Albanian, 89 as French, 84 as Croatian, 82 as Romanian, 62 as Serbian, 62 as Greek, 50 as Turkish, 22 as Silesian, 4 as Korean and 3 as Iranian.

Note on population: The difference values of population numbers in the table "Population statistic" and in the sections "Ethnicity" & "Religion" is caused by the use of various statistical methods.

=== Religion ===
Census 2021 (1+ %)
Religion	Number	Fraction
Roman Catholic Church	487,966	60.32%
Greek Catholic Church	114,401	14.14%
None	85,927	10.62%
Not found out	41,728	5.16%
Evangelical Church	35,597	4.4%
Eastern Orthodox Church	26,993	3.34%
Total	808,931	

In year 2021 was 808,931 people by religion 487,966 from Roman Catholic Church, 114,401 from Greek Catholic Church, 85,927 from None, 41,728 from Not found out, 35,597 from Evangelical Church, 26,993 from Eastern Orthodox Church, 2716 from Jehovah's Witnesses, 2666 from Apostolic Church, 2506 from Christian Congregations in Slovakia, 1635 from Ad hoc movements, 1353 from Other and not ascertained christian church, 1208 from Other, 780 from Calvinist Church, 754 from Church of the Brethren, 555 from Seventh-day Adventist Church, 467 from Buddhism, 410 from Paganism and natural spirituality, 364 from Baptists Church, 248 from Islam, 216 from United Methodist Church, 142 from Old Catholic Church, 123 from Jewish community, 71 from Hinduism, 41 from Church of Jesus Christ of Latter-day Saints, 32 from Czechoslovak Hussite Church, 19 from Bahá'i Community and 13 from New Apostolic Church.

== Politics ==
The current governor of Prešov region is Milan Majerský (KDH). He won with 42% of the vote. In the 2017 election a regional parliament was also elected.

County Council of Prešov region

Type
- Type: Unicameral
- Houses: County Council

Leadership
- Governor: Milan Majerský, KDH

Structure
- Seats: 65
- Political groups: Centre-right group (20) Voice (20) Independent group (9) Together for Region (8) Non-affiliated (8)

Elections
- Last election: 29 October 2022

Meeting place
- Prešov

Website
- County Council of Prešov region

== Population ==
Population statistic (10 years)
Year	1995	2005	2015	2025
Count	768,719	798,596	820,697	810,075
Difference		+3.88%	+2.76%	−1.29%

Population statistic
Year	2024	2025
Count	810,008	810,075
Difference		+0.00%

It has a population of 810,075 people (31 December 2025).

== Administrative division ==
The Prešov Region consists of 13 districts. There are 666 municipalities, of which 23 are towns, where about half of the region's population live.

District	Area [km^{2}]	Population
Bardejov	935.95	75,554
Humenné	754.23	57,846
Kežmarok	629.82	76,376
Levoča	421.00	33,305
Medzilaborce	427.26	10,518
Poprad	1104.69	101,671
Prešov	933.95	176,096
Sabinov	545.44	62,360
Snina	804.74	33,425
Stará Ľubovňa	707.85	53,435
Stropkov	388.92	19,314
Svidník	549.51	30,855
Vranov nad Topľou	769.23	79,320

Population and area values are current for year 2025.

== See also ==
- Spiš
- Šariš
- Zemplín
- Union of Carpathian Youth
