= Zemplín =

Zemplín or Zemplén can refer to:

- Zemplín (region), a region in Slovakia
- Zemplín (village), a village in Slovakia
- Zemplén County, a historical county of the Kingdom of Hungary in present Slovakia and Hungary
