= Cultural Union of Ukrainian Workers in the CSSR =

The Cultural Union of Ukrainian Workers in the Czechoslovak Socialist Republic (Ukrainian: Культурний союз українських трудящих ЧССР, abbreviated KSUT) was an organization set up in 1951 to represent the Ukrainian minority in Czechoslovakia. KSUT replaced the Ukrainian People's Council of the Prešov Region (UNRP), which had been denounced as 'bourgeois'. The founding of KSUT was part of a drive by the Czechoslovak authorities to promote a Ukrainian national identity of the Ukrainian/Ruthenian population in the Prešov region and the use of Ukrainian literary language. KSUT advocated an identity that implied belonging to the (Soviet) Ukrainian people and heralding Czechoslovak socialist patriotism. The KSUT statues indicated that the organization would cooperate with Czechoslovak state organs and educate Ukrainian workers in national identity. KSUT was part of the National Front. The profile of KSUT was similar to that of the organization Csemadok for the Magyar population, and similar National Front organizations for Poles and Germans.

KSUT organized lectures, cultural events and annual festivals (beginning in 1956 in Svidnik). As of 1967 KSUT had 268 sections, with 7,500 individual members. Initially KSUT was restricted to only operating in Slovakia. In 1969 the Czech Socialist Republic government gave permission for KSUT conducts activities among Ukrainians living in Bohemia and Moravia.

The weekly newspaper of KSUT was Nove zhyttia, founded in 1951. KSUT also published the monthly Druzhno vpered (1951-1998) and the journal Duklia (founded in 1953).

During the 1968 Prague Spring, several KSUT leaders were part of the reformist camp. After the ouster of the reformists from power in Prague some KSUT officials (including the chairman Ivan Matsynskyi) were expelled from their jobs, but KSUT continued to operate unaffected by the purge.

After the 1989 Velvet Revolution, KSUT was succeeded by the Rusyn-Ukrainian Union of the Slovak Republic (SRUSR).
