= Győző Zemplén =

Hungarian physicist

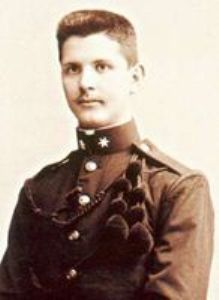
- Zemplén circa 1905
- Born: 17 October 1879; Nagykanizsa, Hungary
- Died: 29 June 1916 (aged 36); Ghertele (Asiago Plateau), Italy
- Children: Győző, Jolán
- Scientific career
- Fields: Hydrodynamics; Kinetic theory of gases

Győző Zemplén (17 October 1879 – 29 June 1916) was a Hungarian physicist who worked in the fields of hydrodynamics and the kinetic theory of gases.

== Life ==
Győző Zemplén was born in the town of Nagykanizsa, Hungary. He grew up in Fiume. In 1896, he began his studies at the University of Budapest and, at 19 years age, won an award with an essay on the viscosity of gases. After that he began theoretical and experimental studies. In 1900 he published the essay "On the basic assumptions of the kinetic theory of gases" in the Annalen der Physik, but had been previously published mathematical works. In the same year he graduated from the university, but remained as a research assistant. In 1902 he became the assistant of Loránd Eötvös, who sent him in 1904-1905 to study abroad in Göttingen and Paris. In Göttingen he developed a mathematical treatment of the theory of shock waves, which gave him the attention of Felix Klein, who invited him to write a corresponding article in the Encyclopaedia of mathematical sciences. By applying entropy considerations (rather than only the energy theorem), he solved an open problem in the theory of shock waves in an essay "Sur l'impossibilité des ondes de choc négatives dans les gaz" in the Comptes Rendus de l'Académie des Sciences (1905). He showed that shock waves propagate only towards rarer gas layers. On his return from Paris, and his Habilitation in 1905, he became a lecturer at the University of Budapest (1905) and at the Technical University of Budapest (1907). In 1912, he became a professor at the Technical University in theoretical physics. He was also a professor at Teachers' Training College in 1908 and was active in the reform of physics teaching in Hungary. Zemplen also dealt with the then new theory of relativity, wrote a textbook on Electrodynamics (The electricity and its practical applications in 1910) and translated a book by Marie Curie on radioactivity and in 1905 wrote a book himself on this issue. In 1908 he became a member of the Hungarian Academy of Sciences, whose Rozsay price he received in 1911. Since 1898 he was a member of the Hungarian Society of Natural Sciences. In 1914 he became secretary of the society founded by Eötvös for the mathematical and physical sciences section and editor of its magazine. He was active also in several other societies and committees and a founding member of the football club of the university. In World War I, he volunteered and carried a battery of mortars on the Serbian front. For some time he lay with typhoid fever in a hospital in Klagenfurt. He fought again at the front in an offensive against the Italians at Monte Dohrbellele (called Dorole by the Austro-Hungarians) in the Battle of Asiago in June 1916. While at a forward observation post, he was hit by shrapnel and died shortly afterwards at a hospital in Ghertele.
