= List of bridges on the National Register of Historic Places in Colorado =

The location of the State of Colorado in the United States of America.

This is a list of bridges and tunnels on the National Register of Historic Places in the U.S. state of Colorado.

Studies of Colorado's historic bridges, to assess which ones could qualify for National Register listing, were conducted in 1983, 1987, 2000, and 2011. The latter study evaluated "712 bridges and grade separations" which had been built during 1959 to 1968.

== Structures ==
| Name | Image | Built | Listed | Location | County | Type |
|---|---|---|---|---|---|---|
| 19th Street Bridge | | 1888 | 1985-02-04 | Denver; 39°45′36″N 105°0′12″W | Denver | 2-span Pratt Through Truss |
| Alpine Tunnel Historic District | | 1879, 1881, 1910 | 1996-04-01 | Hancock, Pitkin, Quartz | Chaffee, Gunnison | |
| Argo Tunnel and Mill | Argo Gold Mine and Mill | 1893 | 1978-01-31 | Idaho Springs | Clear Creek | |
| Arkansas River Bridge | Arkansas River Bridge | 1937 | 1985-02-04 | Buena Vista; 38°48′49″N 106°6′12″W | Chaffee | Pratt Deck Truss |
| Avondale Bridge | | 1913 | 1985-02-04 | Avondale; 38°14′32″N 104°20′54″W | Pueblo | Luten Arch |
| Big Thompson River Bridge III | | 1933 | 2002-10-15 | Loveland; 40°24′54″N 105°11′42″W | Larimer | Camelback pony truss |
| Big Thompson River Bridge IV | | 1933 | 2002-10-15 | Loveland; 40°25′7″N 105°10′47″W | Larimer | Camelback pony truss |
| Black Squirrel Creek Bridge | | 1935 | 2002-10-15 | Falcon; 39°0′12″N 104°30′46″W | El Paso | Parker through truss |
| Boulder Creek Bridge | | 1953 | 2003-03-11 | Boulder; 40°0′52″N 105°19′12″W | Boulder | Concrete slab and girder |
| Bridge No. 10/Adelaide Bridge | | 1894 | 1985-02-04 | Florence; 38°34′17″N 105°5′10″W | Fremont | Built-up Deck Girder bridge |
| Bridge over Burro Canon | | 1936 | 1985-02-04 | Madrid; 37°7′26″N 104°44′26″W | Las Animas | Stone Multiplate Deck Arch |
| Bridge over Fountain Creek | Bridge over Fountain Creek | 1932 | 1985-02-04 | Manitou Springs; 38°52′12″N 104°55′30″W | El Paso | Open Spandral Deck Arch |
| Browns's Canyon Bridge | Brown's Canyon Bridge | 1908 | 2013-07-30 | Salida | Chaffee | Concrete slab and girder |
| Cherry Creek Bridge | | 1948 | 2002-10-15 | Franktown; 39°19′52″N 104°44′2″W | Douglas | Two-rib open-spandrel arch |
| Colorado River Bridge | Colorado River Bridge | 1945 | 2002-10-15 | De Beque; 39°20′20″N 108°11′36″W | Mesa | Parker through truss |
| Costilla Crossing Bridge | Costilla Crossing Bridge | 1892 | 1985-02-04 | Antonito; 37°4′43″N 105°45′22″W | Conejos | Thatcher Through Truss |
| Cottonwood Creek Bridge | | 1923 | 2001-10-12 | Colorado Springs; 38°55′43″N 104°48′35″W | El Paso | cantilevered concrete girder |
| D & RG Narrow Gauge Trestle | | ca. 1880 | 1976-06-18 | Cimarron; 38°27′2″N 107°36′8″W | Montrose | Pratt truss |
| Dolores River Bridge | | 1952 | 2002-10-15 | Bedrock; 38.31067°N 108.88577°W | Montrose | Pennsylvania through truss |
| Dotsero Bridge | | 1935 | 2002-10-15 | Dotsero; 39°38′57″N 107°3′47″W | Eagle | Parker through truss |
| Douglas Crossing Bridge | | 1936 | 1985-02-04 | Granada; 37°47′43″N 102°15′20″W | Prowers | Stone Ashlar Filled Arch |
| Eagle River Bridge | Eagle River Bridge | 1933 | 2002-10-15 | Eagle; 39°39′36″N 106°48′55″W | Eagle | Parker through truss |
| F Street Bridge | F Street Bridge | 1907 | 1985-02-04 | Salida; 38°32′16″N 105°59′33″W | Chaffee | Luten Arch |
| Fruita Bridge | Fruita Bridge | 1906 | 1985-02-04 | Fruita; 39°8′13″N 108°43′50″W | Mesa | Parker Through Truss |
| Granada Bridge | Granada Bridge | 1949 | 2002-10-15 | Granada; 38°5′38″N 102°18′37″W | Prowers | Steel I-beam stringer |
| Great Western Sugar Company Effluent Flume and Bridge | | 1926 | 2014-11-14 | Fort Collins, Colorado; 40°24′42″N 105°02′43″W | Larimer | Suspension bridge |
| Gunnison River Bridge I | Gunnison River Bridge I | 1927 | 2002-10-15 | Gunnison; 38°31′58″N 106°57′6″W | Gunnison | Pratt through truss |
| Gunnison River Bridge II | Gunnison River Bridge II | 1927 | 2002-10-15 | Gunnison; 38°32′2″N 106°56′55″W | Gunnison | Pratt through truss |
| Gunnison Tunnel | Opening of the Gunnison Tunnel | 1901, 1909 | 1979-07-22 | Montrose | Montrose | Irrigation tunnel |
| Hay's Ranch Bridge | | 1900 | 1985-02-04 | Meeker; 40°0′48″N 108°5′32″W | Rio Blanco | Pratt Pony Truss |
| Huerfano Bridge | | 1921 | 1985-02-04 | Boone; 38°13′32″N 104°15′39″W | Pueblo | Filled Spandrel Arch |
| Labo Del Rio Bridge | | 1913 | 1985-06-24 | Arboles; 37°4′33″N 107°24′17″W | Archuleta | Pratt through truss |
| Lebanon and Everett Mine Tunnels | | ca. 1870 | 1971-10-07 | Silver Plume; 39°41′54″N 105°42′47″W | Clear Creek | |
| Little Fountain Creek Bridge | | 1936 | 2002-10-15 | Widefield; 38°40′36″N 104°50′55″W | El Paso | Steel multiplate arch |
| Little Thompson River Bridge | | 1938 | 2002-10-15 | Berthoud; 40°18′3″N 104°58′44″W | Weld | Camelback pony truss |
| Main Street Bridge | | 1921 | 2002-10-15 | Florence; 38°23′21″N 105°6′48″W | Fremont | Spandrel arch |
| Maitland Arroyo Bridge | | 1940 | 2002-10-15 | Walsenburg; 37°39′57″N 104°50′0″W | Huerfano | Timber stringer |
| Manitou Springs Bridges | | 1906, 1907 | 1985-06-24 | Manitou Springs; 38°51′30″N 104°54′57″W | El Paso | Stone arch |
| Maroon Creek Bridge | | 1888, 1929 | 1985-02-04 | Aspen; 39°11′43″N 106°50′2″W | Pitkin | Multi-span Trestle Bridge |
| Miner Street Bridge | Miner Street Bridge | 1901 | 1985-02-04 | Idaho Springs; 39°39′40″N 105°30′45″W | Clear Creek | Skewed Pratt Pony Truss |
| Morley Bridge | Morley Bridge | 1881 | 2003-08-14 | Romley; 38°40′30″N 106°21′51″W | Chaffee | Pratt deck truss |
| North St. Vrain Creek Bridge | North St. Vrain Creek Bridge | 1955 | 2002-10-15 | Lyons; 40°13′22″N 105°16′17″W | Boulder | Concrete rigid frame |
| Plum Bush Creek Bridge | | 1938 | 2002-10-15 | Last Chance; 39°44′23″N 103°32′43″W | Washington | Concrete rigid frame |
| Portland Bridge | | 1926 | 1985-02-04 | Portland; 38°23′19″N 105°0′56″W | Fremont | Pratt Semi-deck Truss |
| Prowers Bridge | | 1902, 1906, 1909 | 1985-02-04 | Prowers; 38°5′37″N 102°46′3″W | Bent | Camelback & Pratt Through |
| Rainbow Arch Bridge | Rainbow Arch Bridge | 1923 | 1985-02-04 | Fort Morgan; 40°16′9″N 103°48′2″W | Morgan | Fixed Rainbow (Marsh) Arch |
| Red Cliff Bridge | Red Cliff Bridge | 1940 | 1985-02-04 | Red Cliff; 39°30′29″N 106°22′34″W | Eagle | Deck Arch Bridge |
| Rifle Bridge | Rifle Bridge | 1909 | 1985-02-04 | Rifle; 39°31′41″N 107°46′51″W | Garfield | Pennsylvania/Parker Truss |
| Rio Grande Railroad Viaduct | | 1931 | 2002-10-15 | Florence; 38°23′10″N 105°4′18″W | Fremont | Cantilevered deck girder |
| Rito Seco Creek Culvert | | 1936 | 2002-10-15 | San Luis; 37°12′0″N 105°25′34″W | Costilla | Multiplate arch |
| Rouch Gulch Bridge | | 1934 | 2002-11-27 | Swissvale; 38°28′20″N 105°52′38″W | Fremont | Concrete spandrel arch |
| Royal Gorge Bridge and Incline Railway | | 1929, 1931 | 1983-09-02 | Canon City | Fremont | Suspension bridge |
| San Luis Bridge | | 1911 | 1985-02-04 | San Luis; 37°11′37″N 105°25′49″W | Costilla | Open Spandrel Arch |
| San Luis Southern Railway Trestle aka Rattlesnake Trestle | San Luis Southern Railway Trestle | 1910 | 2004-01-06 | Blanca; 37°23′12″N 105°32′51″W | Costilla | Railroad Trestle |
| Santa Fe Avenue Bridge | Santa Fe Ave. Bridge | 1924 | 2002-10-15 | Pueblo; 38°15′15″N 104°36′23″W | Pueblo | Pennsylvania through truss |
| Satank Bridge | Satank Bridge | 1900 | 1985-02-04 | Carbondale; 39°25′2″N 107°13′48″W | Garfield | Pratt Through Truss |
| Sevenmile Bridge | | 1935, 1981 | 1985-07-11 | Creede; 37°47′33″N 106°58′51″W | Mineral | Pratt deck truss |
| Sheely Bridge | | 1911, 1966 | 1985-02-04 | Aspen; 39°11′27″N 106°48′46″W | Pitkin | Pratt Through Truss |
| Slate Creek Bridge | | 1924 | 1985-06-24 | Slate Creek; 39°47′0″N 106°9′43″W | Summit | Parker Pony truss |
| South Canon Bridge | | 1914 | 1985-02-04 | Glenwood Springs; 39°33′42″N 107°24′23″W | Garfield | Pennsylvania Through Truss |
| South Platte River Bridge | South Platte River Bridge | 1920 | 2018-03-22 | Lake George; 38°59′11″N 105°21′48″W | Park | Standard-plan concrete deck and girder |
| South Platte River Bridges | South Platte River Bridges | 1951 | 2002-10-15 | Denver; 39°44′36″N 105°0′56″W | Denver | Girder-ribbed deck arch |
| Spring Creek Bridge | Spring Creek Bridge | 1929 | 2002-10-15 | Vona; 39°18′1″N 102°43′41″W | Kit Carson | Concrete Slab |
| St. Charles Bridge | | 1924 | 1985-02-04 | Pueblo; 38°12′3″N 104°32′46″W | Pueblo | Filled Spandrel Arch carrying a county road |
| St. Charles River Bridge | | 1942 | 2003-10-15 | Devine | Pueblo | Parker through truss carrying U.S. 50. Demolished in 2005 but still listed on the NRHP in 2021. |
| State Bridge | | 1890 | 1985-06-24 | State Bridge; 39°51′29″N 106°38′54″W | Eagle | Howe truss |
| Sutherland Bridge | Sutherland Bridge | 1924 | 1985-02-04 | Del Norte; 37°39′48.89″N 106°17′47.11″W | Rio Grande | Warren Pony Truss |
| West Plum Bush Creek Bridge | | 1938 | 2002-10-15 | Last Chance; 39°44′23″N 103°36′40″W | Washington | Concrete rigid frame |
| Wheeler Bridge | | 1924 | 1985-02-04 | Del Norte; 37°39′29″N 106°17′20″W | Rio Grande | Howe Pony Truss |
| 14th Street Viaduct | 14th Street Viaduct | 1898 | removed 1994-07-22 | Denver | Denver | steel stringer viaduct |
| 20th Street Viaduct | | 1909 | removed 1994-07-22 | Denver | Denver | Deck Girder/Through Truss |
| Avery Bridges | | 1914 | removed 2002-09-16 | Hoehne and Aguilar | Las Animas | Avery pony truss |
| Big Thompson River Bridge I | | 1937 | 2002-10-15 removed 2010-11-29 | Estes Park; 40°22′49″N 105°28′19″W | Larimer | Camelback pony truss |
| Big Thompson River Bridge II | | 1937 | 2002-10-15 removed 2010-11-29 | Estes Park; 40°23′22″N 105°27′49″W | Larimer | Camelback pony truss |
| Black Bridge | Black Bridge | 1891 | removed 1994-07-22 | Grand Junction | Mesa | Pratt Through Truss |
| Broadway Bridge | Broadway Bridge | 1895 | removed 1995-02-27 | Denver | Denver | Open-Web Deck Girder |
| Commercial Street Bridge | Commercial Street Bridge | 1905 | removed 1994-07-22 | Trinidad | Las Animas | Luten Arch |
| Delta Bridge | Delta Bridge | 1923 | removed 1994-07-22 | Delta | Delta | 4-span Parker Through Truss |
| Elson Bridge | Elson Bridge | 1905 | removed 2002-09-16 | El Moro | Las Animas | Pratt Through Truss |
| Escalante Canon Bridge | | 1890, 1908, 1938 | removed 1994-07-22 | Delta | Delta | Camelback Through Truss |
| Fourth Street Bridge | | 1891 | 1985-02-04 removed 2010-1-14 | Canon City; 38°26′22″N 105°13′52″W | Fremont | Pratt Through Truss |
| Fifth Street Bridge | Fifth Street Bridge | 1933 | removed 1994-07-22 | Grand Junction | Mesa | Parker Through Truss |
| Four Mile Bridge | Four Mile Bridge | 1900 | removed 1994-07-22 | Steamboat Springs | Routt | Pratt Through Truss |
| Hortense Bridge | Hortense Bridge | 1880 | removed 1997-04-14 | Nathrop | Chaffee | Queenpost Pony Truss |
| Hotchkiss Bridge | Hotchkiss Bridge | 1911 | removed 1994-07-22 | Hotchkiss | Delta | Camelback Through Truss |
| Howard Bridge | | 1924 | removed 2002-09-16 | Howard | Fremont | Warren Pony Truss Bridge |
| Manzanola Bridge | Manzanola Bridge | 1911, 1950 | removed 1994-07-22 | Manzanola | Crowley | Pennsylvania through truss |
| Masonic Park Bridge | | 1909, 1933 | removed 1994-07-22 | South Fork | Rio Grande | Pratt Through Truss |
| Nepesta Bridge | | 1905 | removed 1994-07-22 | Boone | Pueblo | Pratt Through Truss |
| Roubideau Bridge | Roubideau Bridge | 1911 | removed 1994-07-22 | Delta | Delta | Warren Through Truss |
| Whiskey Creek Trestle | | 1905 | removed 1987-11-25 | Rangely | Rio Blanco | |
| Wolcott Bridge | | 1916 | 2002-10-15 removed 2012-3-12 | Wolcott; 39°42′6″N 106°40′39″W | Eagle | Luten arch |

== See also ==
- List of bridges documented by the Historic American Engineering Record in Colorado
- List of tunnels documented by the Historic American Engineering Record in Colorado
- Bibliography of Colorado
- Geography of Colorado
- History of Colorado
- Index of Colorado-related articles
- List of Colorado-related lists
- Outline of Colorado
