= Holland Thompson =

Holland Thompson may refer to:

- Holland Thompson (historian)
- Holland Thompson (politician)

== See also ==
- Holland-Thompson Property, in Carbondale, Colorado
