= St. Charles Bridge =

St. Charles Bridge may refer to:

- Old St. Charles Bridge, over the Missouri River, Missouri, U.S.
- St. Charles Air Line Bridge, over the Chicago River in Chicago, Illinois
- St. Charles Bridge (Pueblo, Colorado), listed on the National Register of Historic Places

== See also ==
- Charles Bridge, over the Vltava river, Prague, Czech Republic
