= National Register of Historic Places listings in Garfield County, Colorado =

Location of Garfield County in Colorado

This is a list of the National Register of Historic Places listings in Garfield County, Colorado.

This is intended to be a complete list of the properties and districts on the National Register of Historic Places in Garfield County, Colorado, United States. The locations of National Register properties and districts for which the latitude and longitude coordinates are included below, may be seen in a map.

There are 20 properties and districts listed on the National Register in the county.

This National Park Service list is complete through NPS recent listings posted September 11, 2026.

== Current listings ==
	Name on the Register	Image	Date listed	Location	City or town	Description
1	Battlement Mesa Schoolhouse	Battlement Mesa Schoolhouse	April 21, 1983 (#83001295)	7201 300 Rd. 39°26′05″N 108°01′43″W	Battlement Mesa	
2	Canyon (Canon) Creek School, District No. 32	Canyon (Canon) Creek School, District No. 32	January 6, 2004 (#03001360)	0566 County Road 137; 39°34′55″N 107°26′54″W	Glenwood Springs	
3	Cardiff Coke Ovens	Cardiff Coke Ovens	November 15, 1996 (#96001331)	County Road 116 approximately 1.5 miles south of Glenwood; 39°30′17″N 107°18′38″W	Glenwood Springs	
4	Citizens National Bank Building	Citizens National Bank Building	July 15, 1999 (#99000824)	801 Grand Ave. 39°32′47″N 107°19′27″W	Glenwood Springs	
5	Earnest Ranch	Earnest Ranch	April 1, 1998 (#98000292)	6471 County Road 117; 39°26′26″N 107°18′42″W	Glenwood Springs	
6	Glenwood Springs Hydroelectric Plant	Glenwood Springs Hydroelectric Plant	October 14, 1998 (#98001244)	601 6th St. 39°33′01″N 107°19′14″W	Glenwood Springs	
7	Havemeyer-Willcox Canal Pumphouse and Forebay	Havemeyer-Willcox Canal Pumphouse and Forebay	April 22, 1980 (#80000900)	West of Rifle; 39°30′00″N 107°55′05″W	Rifle	
8	Holland-Thompson Property		July 23, 2013 (#13000524)	1605 SH 133; 39°23′36″N 107°12′45″W	Carbondale	
9	Hotel Colorado	Hotel Colorado	May 26, 1977 (#77000376)	526 Pine St. 39°34′25″N 107°19′28″W	Glenwood Springs	
10	Missouri Heights School	Missouri Heights School	September 23, 1999 (#99001145)	County Road 102, 0.5 miles east of its junction with County Road 100; 39°25′56″N 107°08′14″W	Carbondale	
11	John Herbert Nunns House	John Herbert Nunns House	December 3, 2013 (#13000871)	311 N. 7th St. 39°32′56″N 107°39′22″W	Silt	
12	Rifle Bridge	Rifle Bridge	February 4, 1985 (#85000213)	Off U.S. Highway 6 over the Colorado River; 39°31′40″N 107°46′54″W	Rifle	Unusual two-span bridge, with one Parker truss and one Pennsylvania truss, spanning the Colorado River since 1909.
13	Satank Bridge	Satank Bridge	February 4, 1985 (#85000211)	County Road 106; 39°25′02″N 107°13′48″W	Carbondale	
14	South Canon Bridge	South Canon Bridge	February 4, 1985 (#85000212)	County Road 134; 39°33′42″N 107°24′23″W	Glenwood Springs	
15	Starr Manor	Starr Manor	June 20, 1986 (#86001350)	901 Palmer Ave. 39°32′43″N 107°19′13″W	Glenwood Springs	
16	Sumers Lodge	Sumers Lodge	June 20, 1997 (#97000593)	1200 Mountain Dr. 39°30′48″N 107°18′53″W	Glenwood Springs	
17	Edward T. Taylor House	Edward T. Taylor House	October 14, 1986 (#86002807)	903 Bennett Ave. 39°32′43″N 107°19′16″W	Glenwood Springs	
18	US Post Office-Rifle Main	US Post Office-Rifle Main	January 24, 1986 (#86000186)	Railroad Ave. and 4th St. 39°31′57″N 107°47′02″W	Rifle	
19	Wasson-McKay Place	Wasson-McKay Place	August 5, 2010 (#10000536)	259 Cardinal Way; 39°26′56″N 108°03′08″W	Parachute	
20	Western Hotel	Western Hotel	March 15, 2016 (#16000074)	716 Cooper Ave. 39°32′51″N 107°19′25″W	Glenwood Springs	

== See also ==
- List of National Historic Landmarks in Colorado
- List of National Register of Historic Places in Colorado
- Bibliography of Colorado
- Geography of Colorado
- History of Colorado
- Index of Colorado-related articles
- List of Colorado-related lists
- Outline of Colorado
