= Bridge over Fountain Creek =

Bridge over Fountain Creek may refer to:

- Bridge over Fountain Creek (U.S. Route 24), about a half mile from Manitou Springs, Colorado, listed on the National Register of Historic Places (NRHP)
- Bridge over Fountain Creek (Manitou Avenue) in Manitou Springs, Colorado, a contributing structure in NRHP-listed Manitou Springs Historic District
