= EWZ Bridge over East Channel of Laramie River =

- U.S. National Register of Historic Places
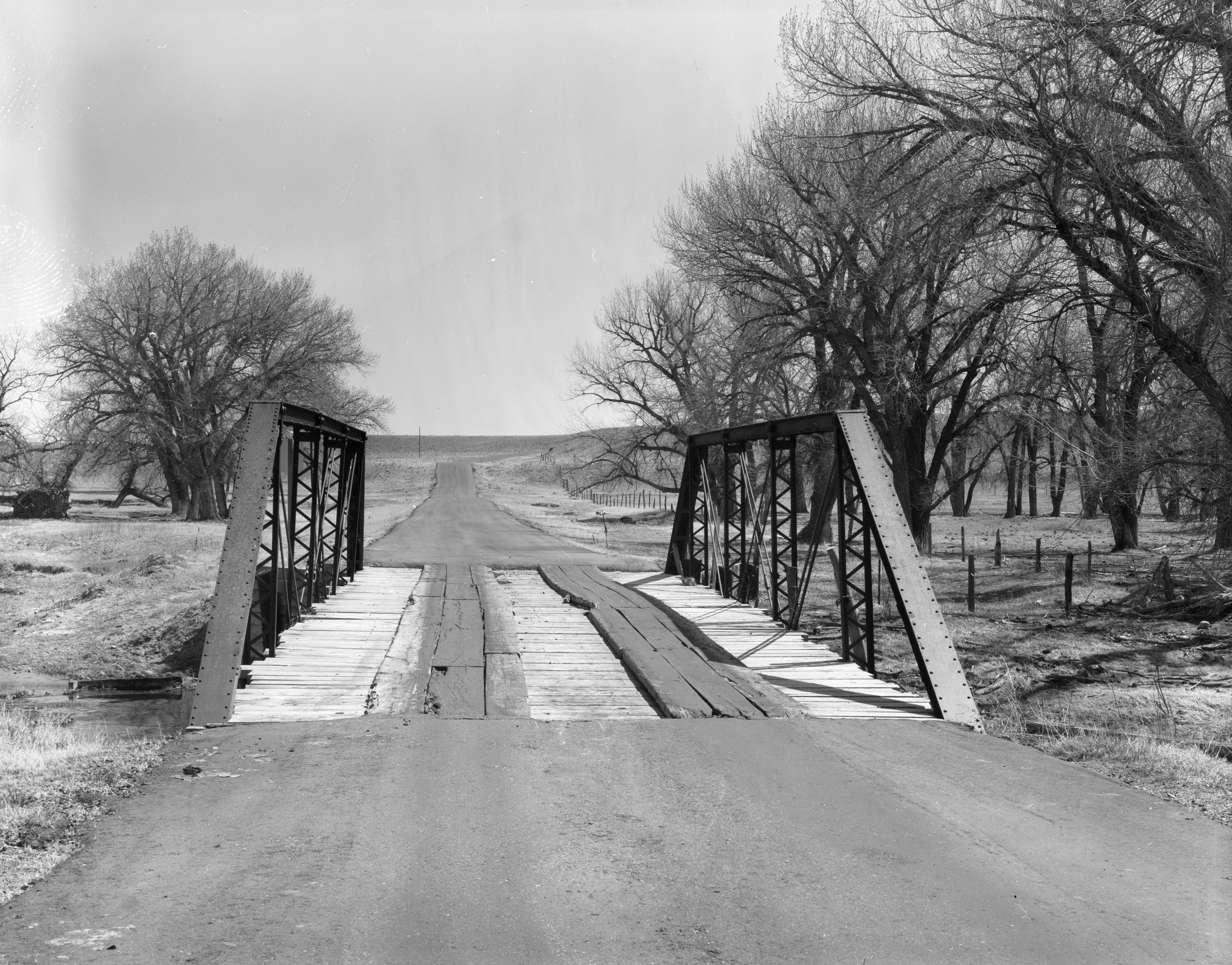
- The bridge in 1982

- Location within Wyoming Location within the United States
- Nearest city: Wheatland, Wyoming
- Coordinates: 42°2′41″N 105°8′51″W
- Area: less than one acre
- Built: 1913–14
- Built by: Pueblo Bridge Company
- Architectural style: Pratt pony truss
- MPS: Vehicular Truss and Arch Bridges in Wyoming TR
- NRHP reference No.: 85000431
- Added to NRHP: February 22, 1985

The EWZ Bridge over East Channel of Laramie River is a Pratt pony truss bridge that was located near Wheatland, Wyoming, which carried Platte County Road CN8-204 (Palmer Canyon Road) over the East Channel of the Laramie River. The bridge was built from 1913 to 1914 by the Pueblo Bridge Company. The single-span bridge was 71 feet 2 inches (21.69 m) long. The bridge's five-panel Pratt pony truss design with steel pin connections was used fairly frequently in Wyoming highway bridges, and the bridge was one of the older examples of the style.

The bridge was added to the National Register of Historic Places on February 22, 1985. It was one of 31 bridges added to the National Register for their role in the history of Wyoming bridge construction.

== See also ==
- List of bridges documented by the Historic American Engineering Record in Wyoming
