= Pueblo Bridge Company =

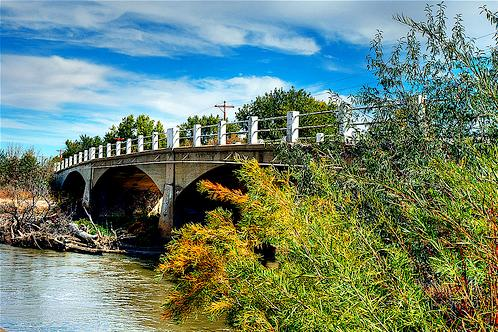
Avondale Bridge, built in 1913

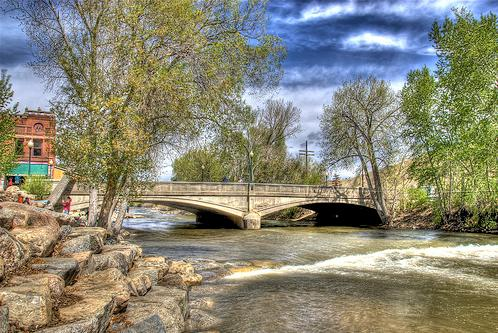
F Street Bridge (Salida, Colorado), a 2 span Luten Arch bridge

The Pueblo Bridge Co. is a firm that built a large number of bridges in the United States. Several are listed on the U.S. National Register of Historic Places.

Works (attribution) include:

- Avondale Bridge, built in 1913, Cty. Rd. 327, Avondale, CO (Pueblo Bridge Co.), NRHP-listed
- Bridge over Fountain Creek, Rt. 24, Manitou Springs, CO (Pueblo Bridge & Construction Co.), NRHP-listed
- EWZ Bridge over East Channel of Laramie River, Cty. Rd. CN8-204, Wheatland, WY (Pueblo Bridge Co.), NRHP-listed
- F Street Bridge, F St., Salida, CO (Pueblo Bridge Co.), NRHP-listed
- Huerfano Bridge, U.S. Hwy 50, Boone, CO (Pueblo Bridge Co.), NRHP-listed
- Prowers Bridge, Cty. Rd. 34, Prowers, CO (Pueblo Bridge Co.), NRHP-listed, the last multispan truss bridge on the lower Arkansas River
- Satank Bridge, Cty. Rd. 106, Carbondale, CO (Pueblo Bridge Co.), NRHP-listed
- Wolcott Bridge, CO 131 at milepost 0.07, Wolcott, CO (Pueblo Bridge Company), NRHP-listed
