= South Platte River Bridge (Park County, Colorado) =

- U.S. National Register of Historic Places
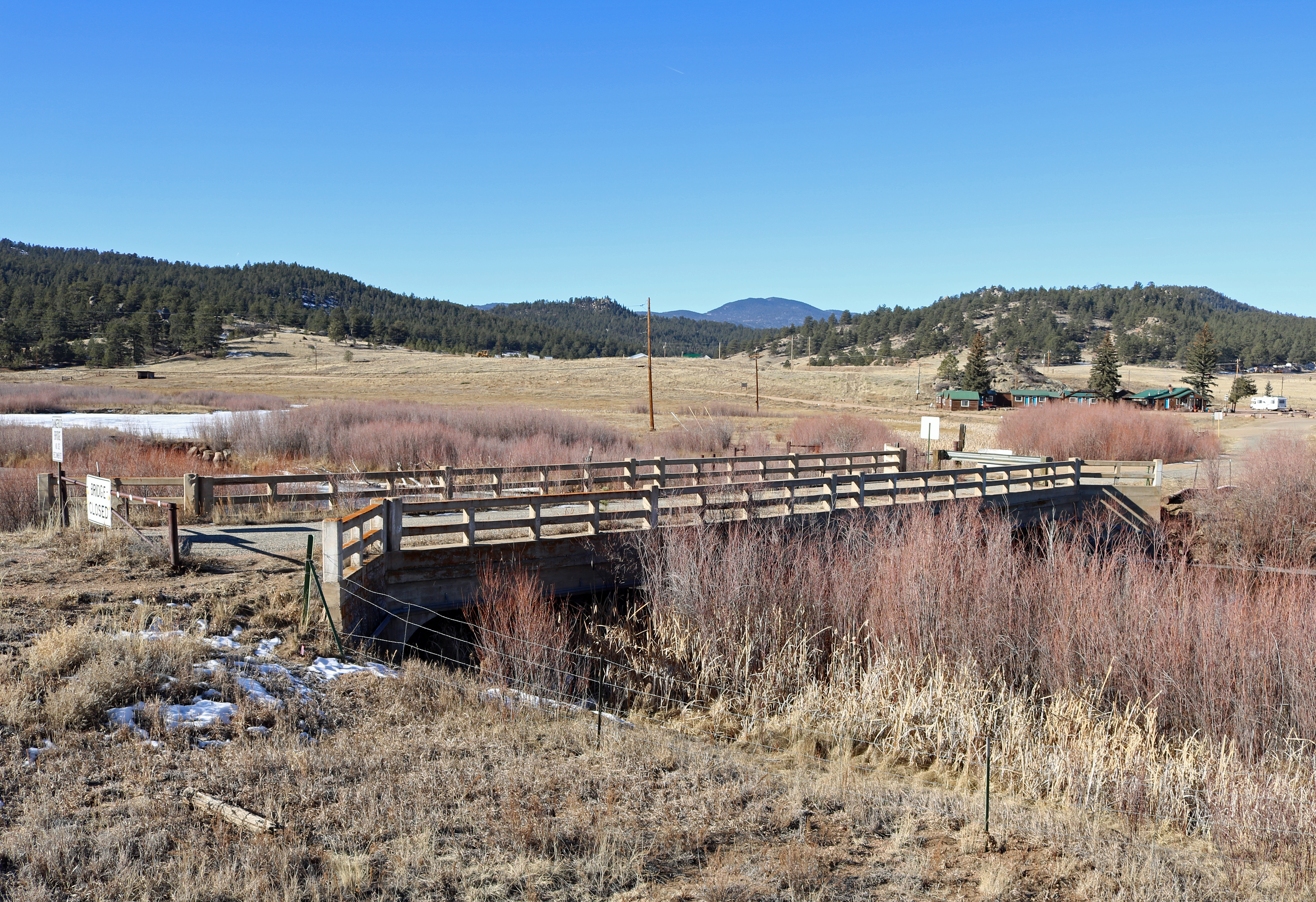
- The bridge in fall, 2018

- Location within Colorado
- Location: Cty. Rd. 90a over S. Platte R., mi. marker 40, near Lake George, Colorado
- Coordinates: 38°59′11″N 105°21′48″W
- MPS: Highway Bridges in Colorado MPS
- NRHP reference No.: 100002221
- Added to NRHP: March 22, 2018

The South Platte River Bridge, in South Park near Lake George, Colorado, was built in 1920. It was listed on the National Register of Historic Places in 2018.

It is a 89 feet (27 m) bridge consisting of two 40 feet (12 m) deck girder spans. It was built in 1920 and then carried State Highway 8 over the South Platte River. The road later became State Highway 4, then U.S Highway 40 South, and then U.S. Highway 24. Highway 24 was rerouted, and the bridge was closed to vehicular traffic in 2008.

It is located at the northwest end of the town of Lake George, next to the Lake George Reservoir. It is often used for fishing.

== See also ==
- South Platte River Bridges, in Denver
