= List of bridges documented by the Historic American Engineering Record in Colorado =

The location of the State of Colorado in the United States of America.

This is a list of bridges documented by the Historic American Engineering Record in the U.S. State of Colorado.

== Bridges ==
Survey No.	Name (as assigned by HAER)	Status	Type	Built	Documented	Carries	Crosses	Location	County	Coordinates
CO-7	South Platte Canyon Road Bridge					South Platte Canyon Road		Denver	Denver	
CO-9	Keystone Bridge	Replaced	Pratt truss	1870	1983	Denver, South Park and Pacific Railroad (former)	South Platte River south fork	Waterton	Jefferson and Douglas	39°27′29″N 105°07′38″W
CO-10	Uintah Railway, Whiskey Creek Trestle	Demolished	Trestle	1906	1988	Uintah Railway	Whiskey Creek	Rangely	Rio Blanco	39°43′04″N 109°01′27″W
CO-13	Deansbury Bridge		Warren truss	1922	1983	Denver, South Park and Pacific Railroad (former)	South Platte River	Waterton	Jefferson and Douglas	
CO-20	Manzanola Bridge	Replaced	Pennsylvania truss	1911	1984	SH 207	Arkansas River	Manzanola	Otero and Crowley	38°07′38″N 103°51′42″W
CO-24	Denver, South Park and Pacific Railroad Truss Bridge	Extant	Pratt truss	1881	1984	Denver, South Park and Pacific Railroad (former)	Pomeroy Gulch	Romley	Chaffee	38°40′30″N 106°21′53″W
CO-25; CO-49	Denver, South Park and Pacific Railroad Bridge; Hortense Bridge	Replaced	Queen post truss	1880	1984; 1986	SH 162	Chalk Creek	Nathrop	Chaffee	38°44′01″N 106°09′34″W
CO-30	Colorado Historic Bridges Survey							Denver	Denver	
CO-30-G	Black Bridge	Demolished	Pratt truss	1891	1988	25 3/10 Road	Gunnison River	Grand Junction	Mesa	39°02′52″N 108°34′33″W
CO-35	Four Mile Bridge	Replaced	Pratt truss	1909	1986	CR 371	Arkansas River	Buena Vista	Chaffee	38°51′57″N 106°08′20″W
CO-36	State Bridge	Replaced	Pratt truss	1908	1985	CR 17	Rio Grande	Del Norte	Rio Grande	37°41′20″N 106°27′36″W
CO-37	Swink Bridge	Replaced	Parker truss	1912	1985	CR 24.5	Arkansas River	Swink	Otero	38°01′37″N 103°37′44″W
CO-40	Hotchkiss Bridge	Replaced	Parker truss	1911	1987	3400 Road	North Fork Gunnison River	Hotchkiss	Delta	38°47′31″N 107°43′33″W
CO-41	Fifth Street Bridge	Replaced	Parker truss	1933	1987	US 50	Colorado River	Grand Junction	Mesa	39°03′16″N 108°33′57″W
CO-44	Baseline Bridge	Replaced	Warren truss	1926	1986	CR 2 (East 168th Avenue)	South Platte River	Brighton	Adams	40°00′01″N 104°49′39″W
CO-48	Broadway Bridge	Replaced	Steel built-up girder	1896	1986	Broadway	Cherry Creek	Denver	Denver	39°43′37″N 104°59′15″W
CO-51	Twentieth Street Viaduct	Replaced	Viaduct	1911	1991	20th Street	South Platte River	Denver	Denver	39°45′38″N 105°00′15″W
CO-52	Fourteenth Street Viaduct	Demolished	Viaduct	1898	1988	14th Street	South Platte River	Denver	Denver	39°44′57″N 105°00′10″W
CO-53	Commercial Street Bridge	Replaced	Reinforced concrete through arch	1905	1988	Commercial Street	Purgatoire River	Trinidad	Las Animas	37°10′21″N 104°30′26″W
CO-54	Linden Avenue Bridge	Replaced	Pennsylvania truss	1912	1988	Linden Avenue	Purgatoire River	Trinidad	Las Animas	37°10′22″N 104°29′57″W
CO-55	Nepesta Bridge	Replaced	Pratt truss	1905	1988	CR 613	Arkansas River	Boone	Pueblo	38°10′44″N 104°08′21″W
CO-57	Delgany Street Railroad Bridge	Extant	Pratt truss	1923	1988	Delgany Street	Cherry Creek	Denver	Denver	39°45′05″N 105°00′19″W
CO-58	Cherry Creek Railroad Bridge	Extant	Pratt truss	1923	1988	Colorado and Southern Railway	Cherry Creek	Denver	Denver	39°45′5″N 105°00′19″W
CO-59	Nineteenth Street Bridge	Extant	Pratt truss	1888	1991	19th Street	South Platte River	Denver	Denver	39°45′35″N 105°00′15″W
CO-60	Four Mile Bridge	Replaced	Pratt truss	1900	1988	CR 42	Elk River	Steamboat Springs	Routt	40°30′53″N 106°57′14″W
CO-62	Delta Bridge	Replaced	Parker truss	1924	1989	US 50	Gunnison River	Delta	Delta	38°45′02″N 108°04′10″W
CO-70	Roubideau Bridge	Replaced	Warren truss	1911	1991	G50 Road	Gunnison River	Delta	Delta	38°44′53″N 108°07′12″W
CO-72	Saxton Bridge	Replaced	Parker truss	1890	1993	650 Road	Gunnison River	Delta	Delta	38°45′28″N 108°15′30″W
CO-76	Baxterville Bridge	Replaced	Pratt truss	1909	1993	Masonic Park Drive	Rio Grande	South Fork	Rio Grande	37°42′03″N 106°41′08″W
CO-77	Elson Bridge	Replaced	Pratt truss	1905	1993	CR 36	Purgatoire River	El Moro	Las Animas	37°14′52″N 104°24′19″W
CO-102	Dolores River Bridge	Replaced	Pennsylvania truss	1952	2016	SH 90	Dolores River	Bedrock	Montrose	38°18′38″N 108°53′09″W

== See also ==
- List of bridges on the National Register of Historic Places in Colorado
- List of tunnels documented by the Historic American Engineering Record in Colorado
- Bibliography of Colorado
- Geography of Colorado
- History of Colorado
- Index of Colorado-related articles
- List of Colorado-related lists
- Outline of Colorado
