= Citizens National Bank Building (Glenwood Springs, Colorado) =

Historic building in Colorado, US

- U.S. National Register of Historic Places
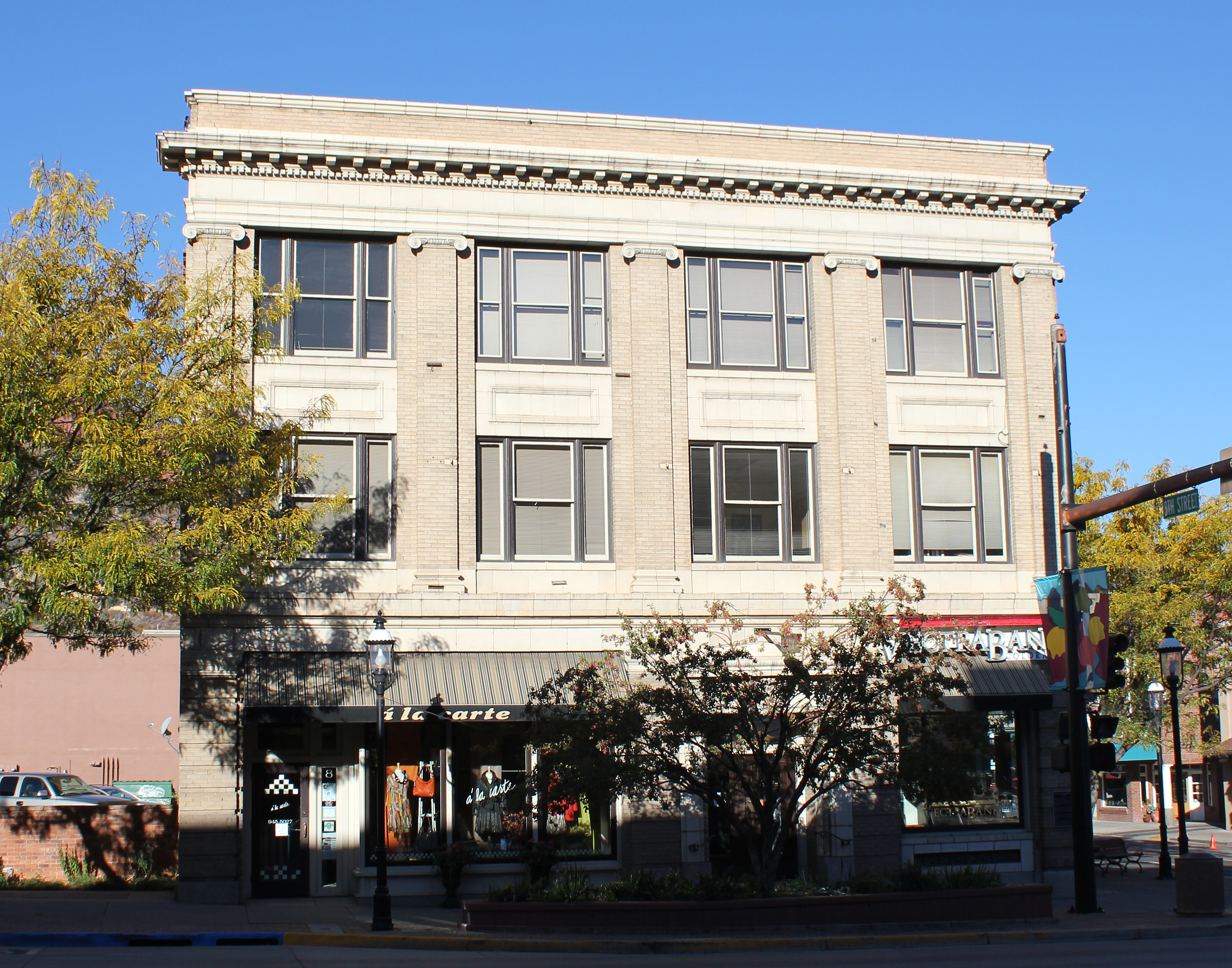

- Location within Colorado Location within the United States
- Location: 801 Grand Ave., Glenwood Springs, Colorado
- Coordinates: 39°32′47″N 107°19′27″W
- Area: less than one acre
- Built: 1913
- Architect: Guy B. Robertson
- Architectural style: Classical Revival
- NRHP reference No.: 99000824
- Added to NRHP: July 15, 1999

The Citizens National Bank Building, at 801 Grand Ave. in Glenwood Springs, Colorado, was built in 1913. It was listed on the National Register of Historic Places in 1999. It has also been known as the New Citizens Building. Besides serving as a financial institution, it has served as a specialty store and as a hotel.

It was designed by Denver architect Guy B. Robertson. It is a three-story building, prominent on the corner of Grand Ave. and 8th st. as almost all other Grand Ave. buildings are one or two stories tall. It is a two-part commercial block building, with Classical Revival ornamentation, and also with elements of 20th Century Commercial Style including in its flat roof, projecting cornice, and Chicago-style windows on its upper floors.

== See also ==
- National Register of Historic Places listings in Garfield County, Colorado
