= Bridge over Fountain Creek (U.S. Route 24) =

- U.S. National Register of Historic Places
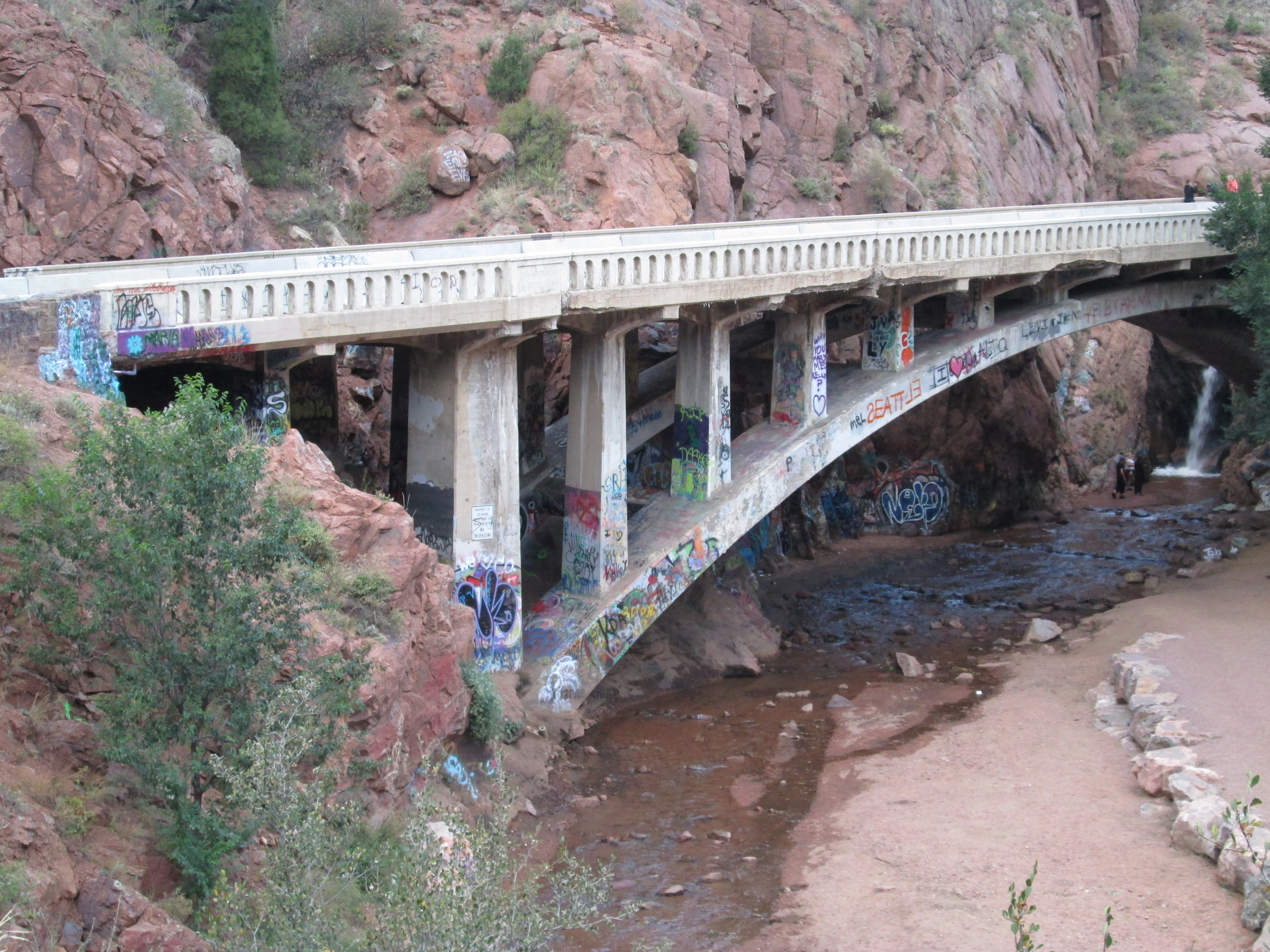
- The bridge in 2013

- Location within Colorado
- Location: US 24 Bus. – Manitou Springs
- Coordinates: 38°52′12″N 104°55′30″W
- Area: 0.2 acres (0.081 ha)
- Built: 1932
- Built by: Pueblo Bridge & Construction Co.
- Engineer: King Burghardt
- Architectural style: Open Spandral Deck Arch
- MPS: Vehicular Bridges in Colorado TR
- NRHP reference No.: 85000206
- Added to NRHP: February 4, 1985

The Bridge over Fountain Creek which was built to bring U.S. Route 24 (US 24) over Fountain Creek, approximately 0.5 miles (0.80 km) north of Manitou Springs, Colorado, was built in 1932. It now carries US 24 Business (US 24 Bus.; Manitou Avenue). It is an open spandrel deck arch span. It was listed on the National Register of Historic Places in 1985.

It was designed by engineer King Burghardt, who was "one of the Highway Department's most innovative bridge engineers". It is a 160-foot (49 m) reinforced concrete bridge. It "featured attractive rubble masonry retaining walls and lamposts at the approaches", but the lamposts have since been removed. Burghardt also designed the Red Cliff Bridge which carries US 24 in Red Cliff, Colorado, and Sevenmile Bridge, near Creede, Colorado, both of which are also listed on the National Register.

It was constructed by contractor Pueblo Bridge & Construction Co. at cost of $44,695 (equivalent to $8.3 million in 2024 dollars).

== See also ==
- Bridge over Fountain Creek (Manitou Avenue), in Manitou Springs and also NRHP-listed, as a contributing structure in Manitou Springs Historic District
