= Bridge over Burro Cañon =

- Bridge over Burro Canon
- U.S. National Register of Historic Places
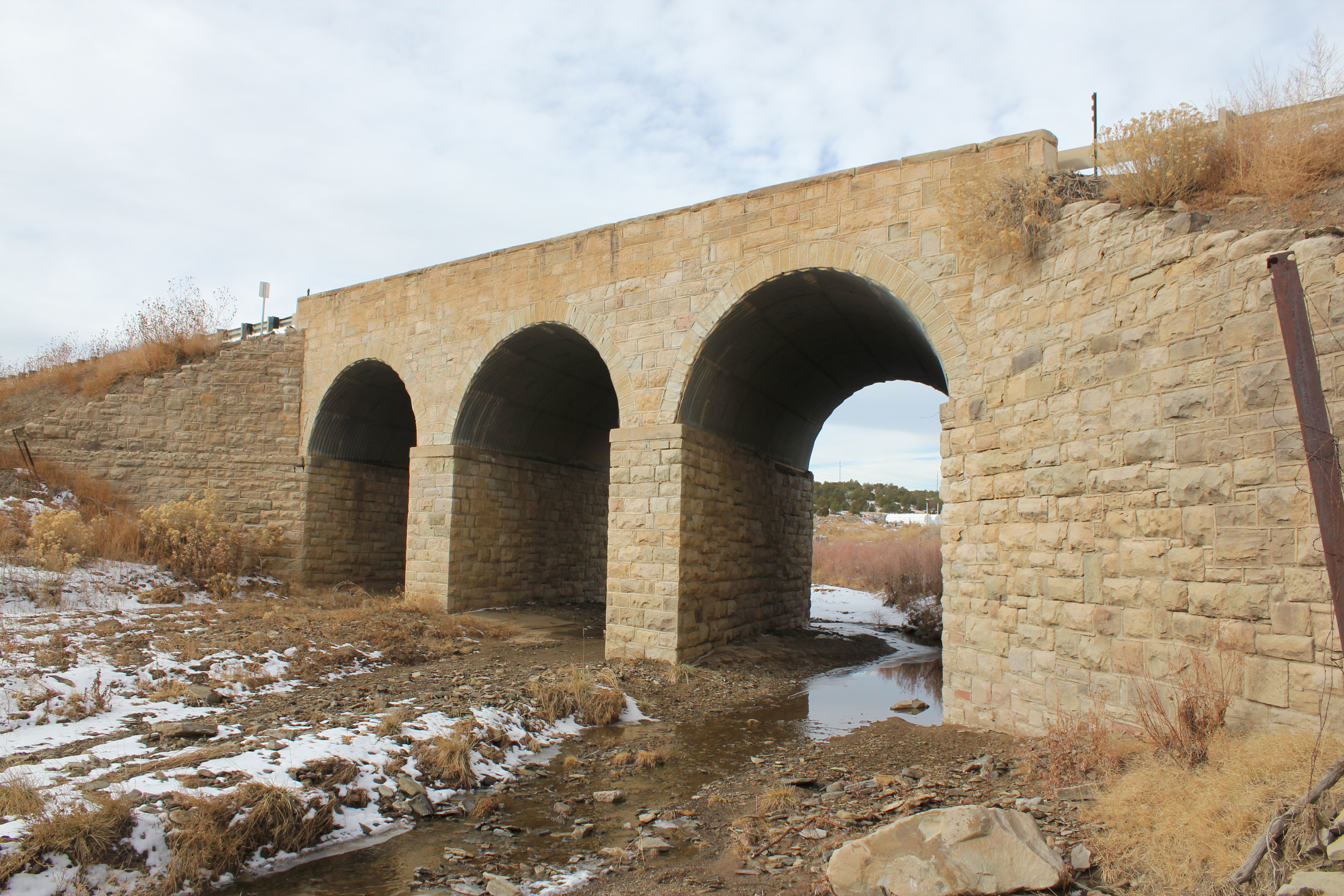
- Bridge in 2012. Descent by steps of tops of wingwalls can be seen. "Multiplates" lining the inside of the archways can be seen.

- Location within Colorado
- Nearest city: Madrid, Colorado
- Coordinates: 37.12377°N 104.73969°W
- Area: 0.1 acres (0.040 ha)
- Built: 1936
- Built by: Works Progress Administration
- Architectural style: Stone multiplate deck arch
- MPS: Vehicular Bridges in Colorado TR
- NRHP reference No.: 85000216
- Added to NRHP: February 4, 1985

The Bridge over Burro Cañon, near Madrid, Colorado, was built in 1936. It carries Colorado State Highway 12, a main route linking La Veta with Trinidad, over an arroyo. It was listed on the National Register of Historic Places in 1985.

It was one of about 30 Works Progress Administration-funded bridges built in southeast Colorado, and one of three in Las Animas County, in the late 1930s; it is the only WPA-funded bridge in Colorado that has a skewed configuration, crossing the arroyo at an angle.

Its archways are lined with "multiplates" fabricated by the Hardesty Manufacturing Company, a cement and concrete products company still existing in 2021, located in Tulsa, Oklahoma.

It is a triple-arch masonry bridge 67.67 feet (20.63 m) long, 30 feet (9.1 m) wide, with a 17.1 feet (5.2 m) central arch and two 16.1 feet (4.9 m) side arches. The arches are semi-circular, have tapered voussoirs, and are lined with multiplates. The two piers formed between the arches are beveled. It has stone parapet walls, abutments, and stepped wingwalls.

It was documented for the Historic American Engineering Record HAER by the Colorado Department of Highways in 1983.

It "features rusticated stone facing and grapevined mortar joints, trademarks of Works Progress Administration workmanship in southeastern Colorado."
