= Missouri Heights School =

Historic school building in Colorado, US

- U.S. National Register of Historic Places
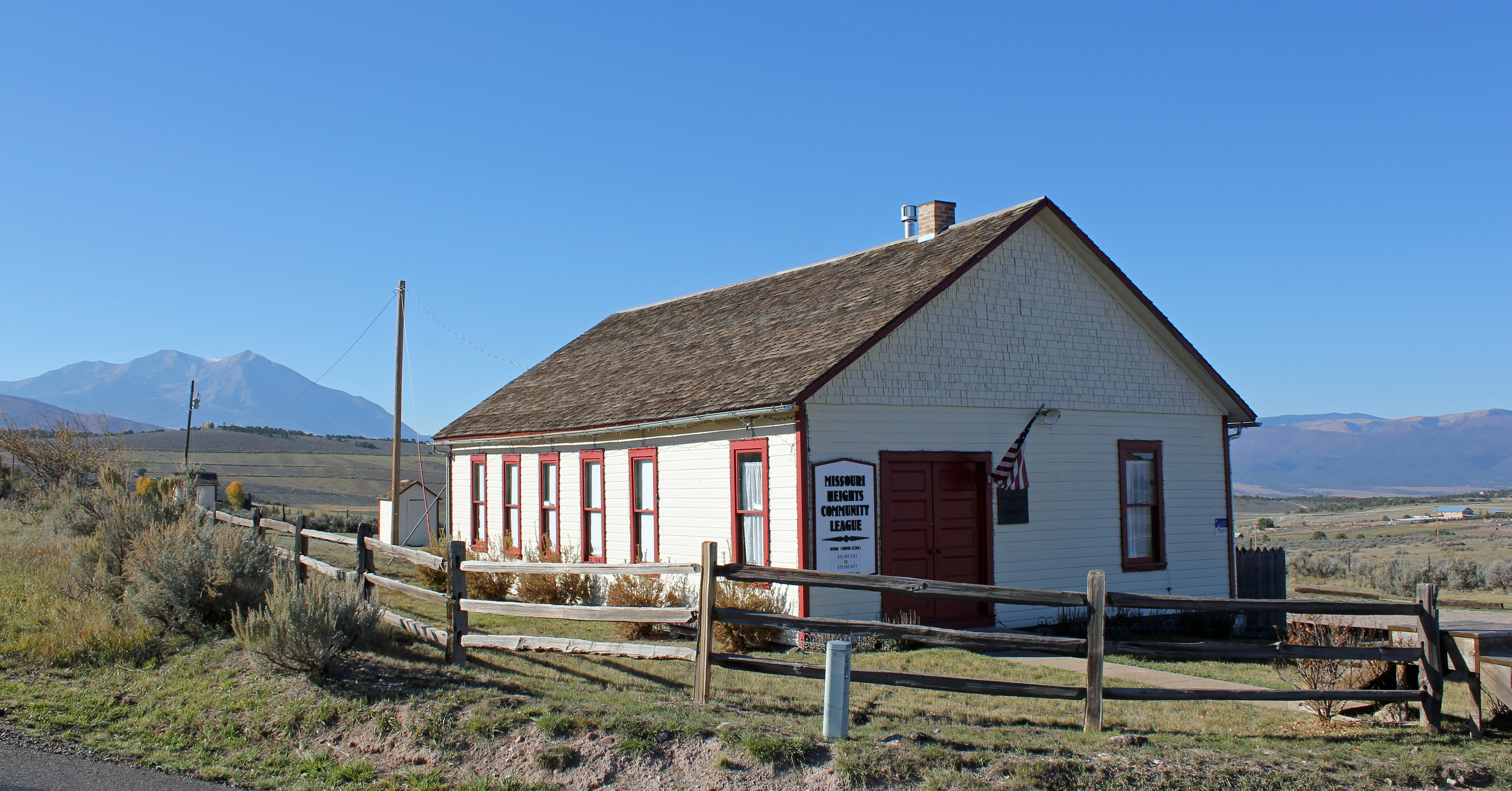

- Location within Colorado
- Nearest city: Carbondale, Colorado
- Coordinates: 39°25′56″N 107°08′14″W
- Area: less than one acre
- Built: 1917
- MPS: Rural School Buildings in Colorado MPS
- NRHP reference No.: 99001145
- Added to NRHP: September 23, 1999

The Missouri Heights School, in Garfield County, Colorado near Carbondale, Colorado, was listed on the National Register of Historic Places in 1999.

The 26 by 44 feet (7.9 m × 13.4 m) school was built in 1917. It is located at an elevation of 6,950 feet (2,120 m) "in a rolling open alpine plateau area known since the late 1800s as Missouri Heights. Surrounded by cattle range and scrubland thick with sagebrush, the Missouri Heights School property includes a school building, a teacherage, two outhouses and a coal shed."

It is located on County Road 102, 0.5 miles (0.80 km) east of its junction with County Road 100, and is about 4 miles (6.4 km) northeast of the town of Carbondale.

== See also ==
- National Register of Historic Places listings in Garfield County, Colorado
