= Starr Manor =

Historic house in Colorado, US

- U.S. National Register of Historic Places
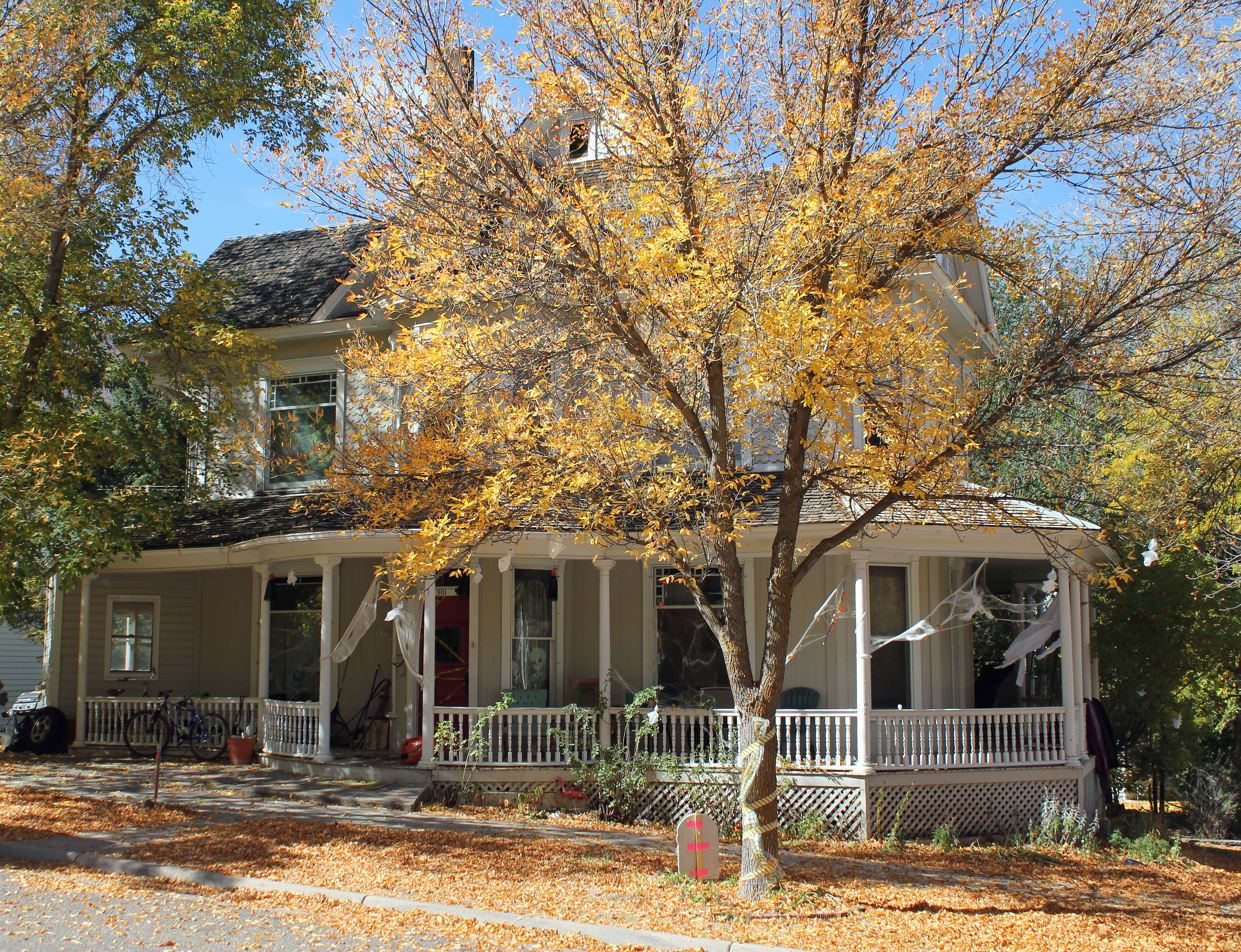

- Location within Colorado
- Location: 901 Palmer Ave., Glenwood Springs, Colorado
- Coordinates: 39°32′43″N 107°19′13″W
- Area: 0.1 acres (0.040 ha)
- Built: 1901
- Architectural style: Queen Anne
- NRHP reference No.: 86001350
- Added to NRHP: June 20, 1986

The Starr Manor, at 901 Palmer Ave. in Glenwood Springs, Colorado, is a Queen Anne-style house which was built in 1901. It was listed on the National Register of Historic Places in 1986.

It was deemed "significant as a good example of a large, intact Queen Anne residence, defined by the textured wall surfaces, wrap-around porch, multi-gabled roof, circular bay, and spindles, pendants, and sunburst detailing."

The listing includes a carriage house which was built around 1910.

== See also ==
- National Register of Historic Places listings in Garfield County, Colorado
