= Satank, Colorado =

Unincorporated community in Colorado, US

- Unincorporated community
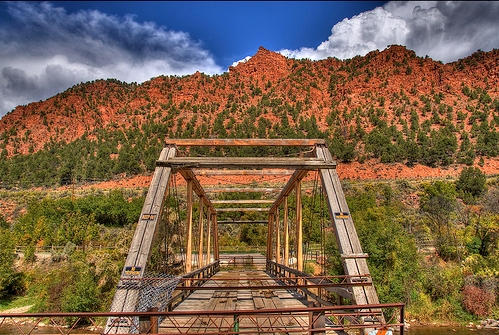
- Satank Bridge

- Location of Satank, Colorado. Satank (Colorado)
- Coordinates: 39°24′50″N 107°13′42″W
- Country: United States
- State: Colorado
- County: Garfield
- Established: 1882
- Founder: Harvey Tanney, Isaac Cooper, and Frederick Childs

Government
  - Type: unincorporated community
  - Body: Garfield County
- Elevation: 6,119 ft (1,865 m)
- Time zone: UTC−07:00 (MST)
  - Summer (DST): UTC−06:00 (MDT)
- GNIS pop ID: 174838

Satank is an unincorporated community in Garfield County in the U.S. state of Colorado. The community is adjacent to Carbondale – with residents considering Satank an alternative to living with the municipality – and about 10 mi (16 km) from Glenwood Springs. The community absorbed the neighboring settlement of Cooperton, was at one point renamed to Moffat, and has at times been referred to as Rockford.

== History ==
The Satank, Colorado, post office operated from June 27, 1882, until July 14, 1904. Harvey Tanney established the post office in a spot that is now within the Carbondale town limits. Tanney likely named Satank after the Kiowa warrior Sitting Bear, whose common untranslated name is Satank. Satank is located about 10 mi (16 km) from Glenwood Springs.

A nearby settlement named Cooperton was established by Isaac Cooper and Fredrick Childs. Cooper had previously been involved in founding Glenwood Springs, and the pair hoped that Cooperton would develop into a town. They entered into negotiations with Tanney to move the Satank post office to Cooperton, but Tanney died before any arrangement was made. The move was blocked until the departure of Attama Tanney, Tanney's daughter who had taken over for her father on his death. Once Attama Tanney left, Childs became the postmaster and performed the move. However, he chose to retain Satank as the post office's name, leading to Cooperton adopting it as their settlement's name. Satank was laid out in 1885.

Cooper had invested a substantial amount in the Denver & Rio Grande Railroad (D&RG), which was expanding out of Glenwood Springs. As part of his efforts to get the railroad to go to Satank, he renamed the community as Moffat after the railroad's owner, David Moffat. However, the settlement was in competition with the nearby community of Carbondale, which was sponsored by investors from Carbondale, Pennsylvania. Cooper died in 1887 while in negotiations with D&RG, and the Pennsylvania-based investors successfully established a depot in Carbondale. A railroad stop was installed in Moffat in 1887 and led to a period of success in the community, but its rival benefited from Colorado Fuel and Iron (CF&I), which planned to establish a substantial coking operation in Carbondale. Moffat declined following CF&I's influence on the D&RG, leading to the community Moffat to be bypassed by the railroad in favor of Carbondale.

Prior to its reversal in fortunes, the settlement once contained a restaurant, saloons, and the Hotel Moffat, which had opened with a grand ball attended by people from across the nearby region. After it lost out to Carbondale, Moffat quickly depopulated and Childs abandoned the post office. The settlement was again renamed as Satank and the post office was operated by Ben Davis until 1904, with postal services then performed in Carbondale.

A school was established in Satank by Elizabeth Mullens in September 1904. As part of his romantic pursuit of the Coloradan sculptor Alice Cooper, the Chicagoan attorney Nathan H. Hubbard purchased 28 lots in Satank in May 1907. Alice Cooper was the daughter of Isaac Cooper and grew up in a homestead on the edge of Cooperton. Though widely known as Satank, the community was still referred to as Cooperton through at least 1911. The community was also at times referred to as Rockford.

The community remains populated into the 21st century, with residents considering it an alternative to residence within Carbondale that approximates the Old West. Satank lacks the services available in the municipality, with no arrangement for Carbondale to provide water or sewage. The community does not have any sidewalks and the roads are mostly unpaved. However, residents of Satank have expressed appreciation for the absence of town regulations. The Carbondale post office (ZIP code 81623) now serves Satank addresses.

== Satank Bridge ==
In 1900, Garfield County built the Satank Bridge for $2,325 (equivalent to $89,978 in 2025). Built in a Pratt through-truss design, the iron and steel bridge was a critical link between Satank and Carbondale with Glenwood Springs over the Roaring Fork River. The bridge was raised about 3 ft (0.91 m) in 1917.

Now the only bridge of its design in Colorado, restoration work funded by Garfield County and a History Colorado grant began in 2010. At $297,500 (equivalent to $425,786 in 2025), History Colorado grant was the largest ever given by the society to a single project. The total cost was estimated to be at least $750,000 (equivalent to $1,073,410 in 2025). A ribbon cutting ceremony for the reopened bridge was performed on May 12, 2011.

== See also ==
- List of populated places in Colorado
- List of post offices in Colorado
