= Holland-Thompson Property =

Historic buildings in Colorado, US

- Holland--Thompson Property
- U.S. National Register of Historic Places
- Location within Colorado Location within the United States
- Location: 1605 CO 133, Carbondale, Colorado
- Coordinates: 39°23′36″N 107°12′45″W
- Area: 1.5 acres (0.61 ha)
- Built: c. 1900
- Built by: Myron Thompson
- Architectural style: Queen Anne
- NRHP reference No.: 13000524
- Added to NRHP: July 23, 2013

The Holland-Thompson Property, at 1605 CO 133 in Carbondale, Colorado, was listed on the National Register of Historic Places in 2013. The listing included two contributing buildings, four contributing structures, and three contributing sites.

The Thompson House, a brick Queen Anne-style house on the property, was built in several stages from 1886 to 1910.

== See also ==
- National Register of Historic Places listings in Garfield County, Colorado
