= South Canon Bridge =

Footbridge over the Colorado River

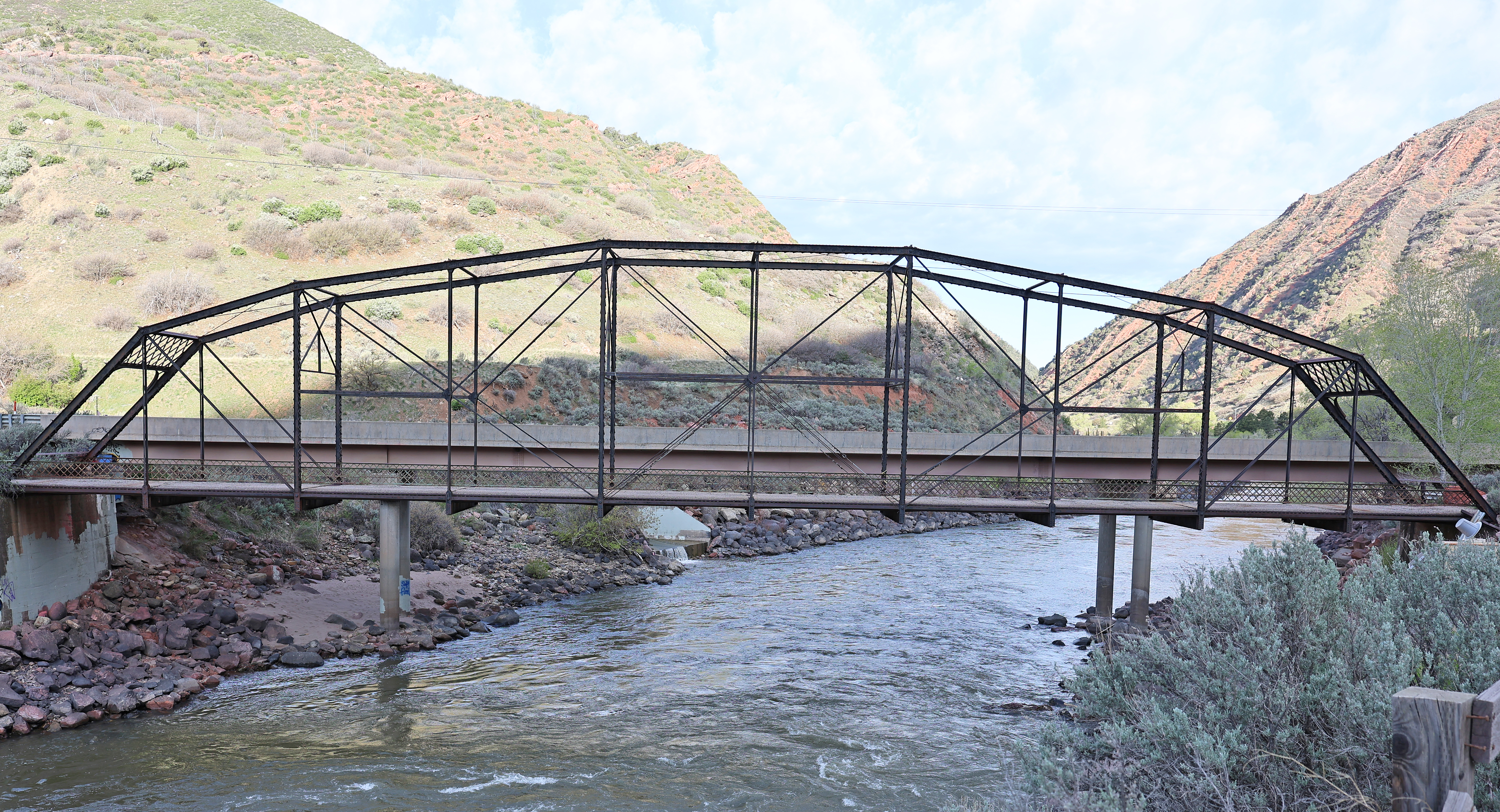
- The bridge in 2025
- Coordinates: 39°33′41.76″N 107°24′25.2″W
- Crosses: Colorado River
- Locale: Glenwood Springs, Colorado

Characteristics
- Design: Truss bridge

History
- Construction end: 1915

The South Canon Bridge is a former truss road bridge spanning the Colorado River near Glenwood Springs, Colorado. It was built in 1915 by the Missouri Valley Bridge & Iron Co.. It was listed on the National Register of Historic Places (reference number 85000212) in 1985.

It was built during 1914-15 and has a Pennsylvania truss design, with 10 panels. It was built by the Missouri Valley Bridge and Iron Company for $9430. It is 190 feet (58 m) long. It brought County Road 134 over the Colorado River about 4.6 miles (7.4 km) west of Glenwood Springs

== See also ==
- National Register of Historic Places listings in Garfield County, Colorado
