= Slate Creek Bridge =

Bridge in Colorado

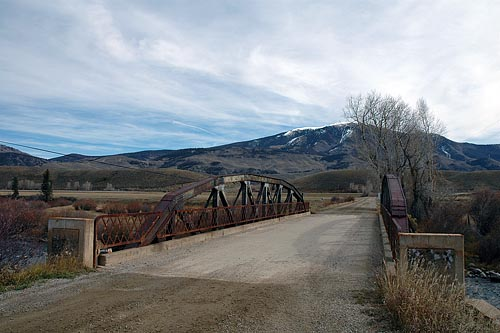
- Coordinates: 39°46′59″N 106°09′43″W
- Carries: Vehicle traffic
- Crosses: Blue River
- Locale: near Silverthorne, Colorado
- Slate Creek Bridge
- U.S. National Register of Historic Places
- Location within Colorado Location within the United States
- Location: Slate Creek Rd. (Cty. Rd. 1450) over Blue River
- Coordinates: 39.78351°N 106.16257°W
- Built: 1924
- Built by: Rogers and Pickard
- Architectural style: Parker Pony truss
- MPS: Vehicular Bridges in Colorado TR
- NRHP reference No.: 85001402
- Added to NRHP: June 24, 1985

Location
- Interactive map of Slate Creek Bridge

The Slate Creek Bridge is a riveted steel Parker pony truss bridge spanning the Blue River 9 miles (14.5 km) north of Silverthorne, Colorado. It is named after the road it carries, Slate Creek Road. The bridge was rehabilitated in 1951. This rare example of an uncommon truss type was listed on the National Register of Historic Places in 1985.

It was fabricated by the American Bridge Co. and installed in 1924 by bridge contractors Rogers and Pickard. It features "a poured-in-place concrete deck and buttress outriggers at the panel points."

The only other riveted Parker pony truss bridge known to survive in Colorado. (The San Francisco Creek Bridge, built in 1926, has been moved from its original location).
