= State Bridge (Eagle County, Colorado) =

- U.S. National Register of Historic Places
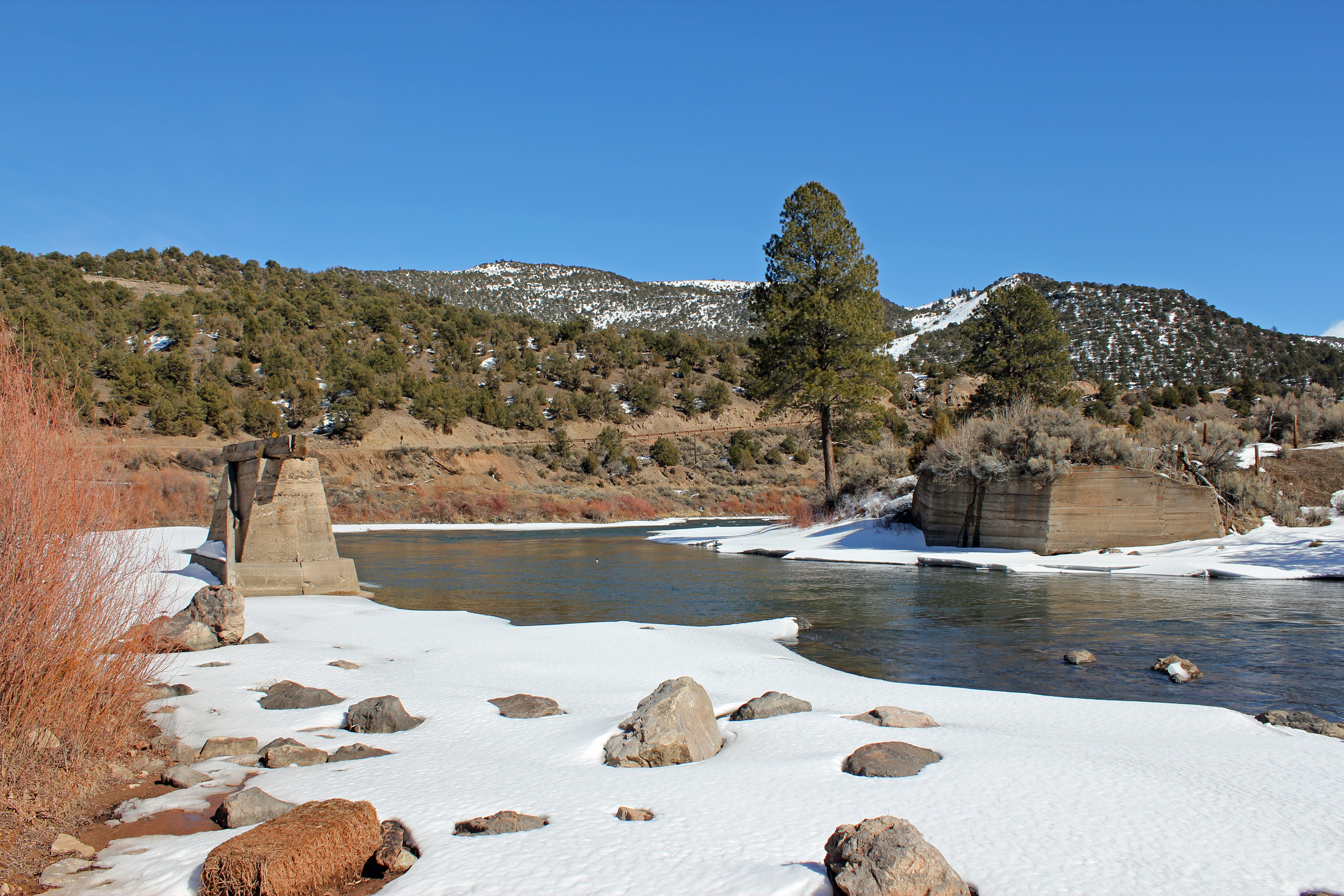
- Ruins of bridge, in 2011

- Location within Colorado Location within the United States
- Location: Off CO 131, State Bridge, Colorado
- Coordinates: 39°51′29″N 106°38′54″W
- Area: 0 acres (0 ha)
- Built: 1890
- Built by: Missouri Valley Bridge Company
- Architectural style: Howe truss
- MPS: Vehicular Bridges in Colorado TR
- NRHP reference No.: 85001401
- Added to NRHP: June 24, 1985

The State Bridge, at State Bridge, Colorado, off Colorado State Highway 131, was a two-span Howe truss bridge built in 1890. It was listed on the National Register of Historic Places in 1985.

It was built by the Missouri Valley Bridge Company, low bidder for the contract. The bridge was the third-earliest bridge designed and built for the Colorado State Engineer, and was the oldest surviving as of 1983. When listed, with only one of its two spans surviving, it was one of the oldest vehicular bridges in the state.

The second span has been lost.

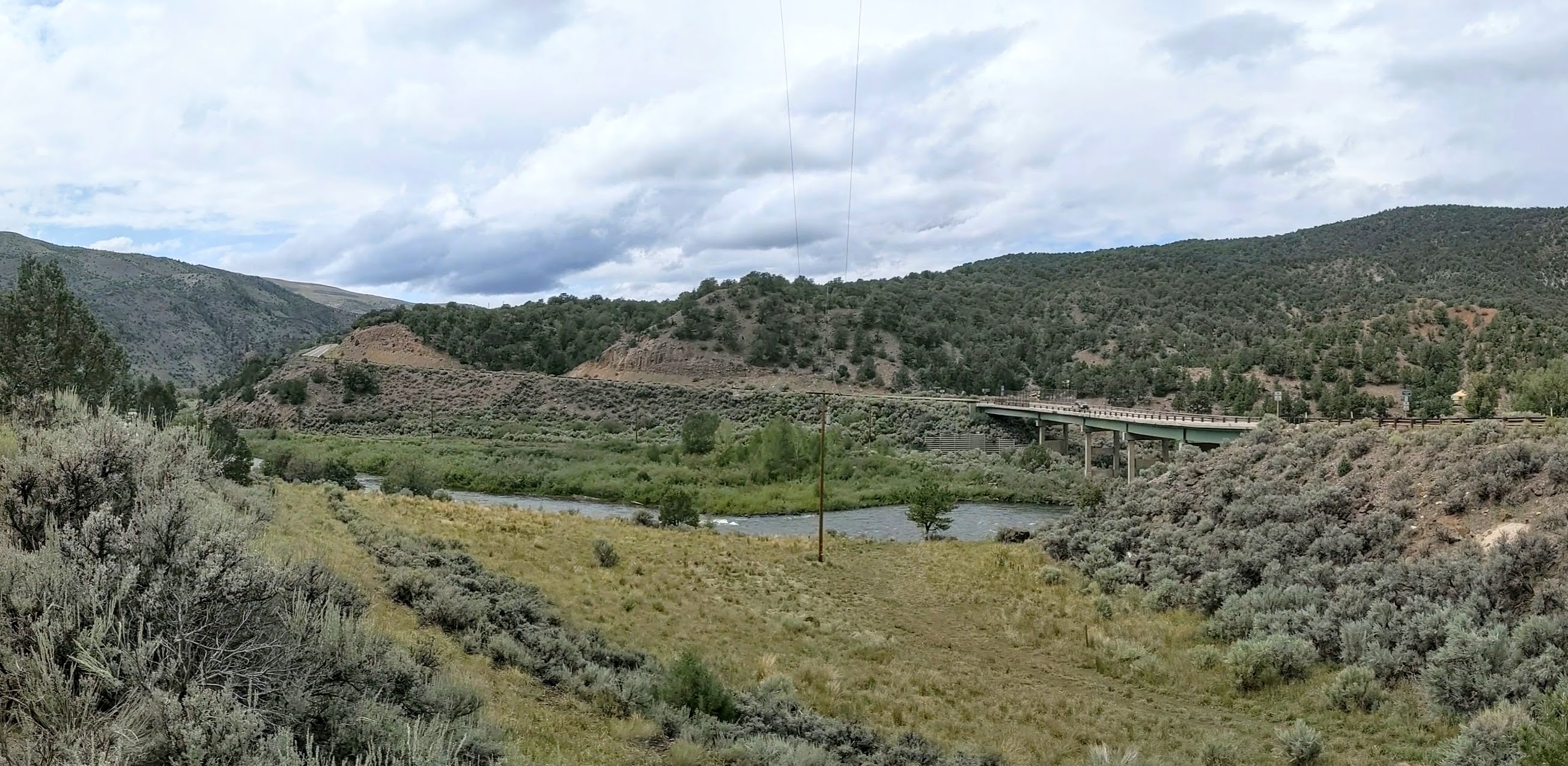
The new bridge at State Bridge on Colorado State Highway 131 across the Colorado River
