= Morley Bridge =

- U.S. National Register of Historic Places
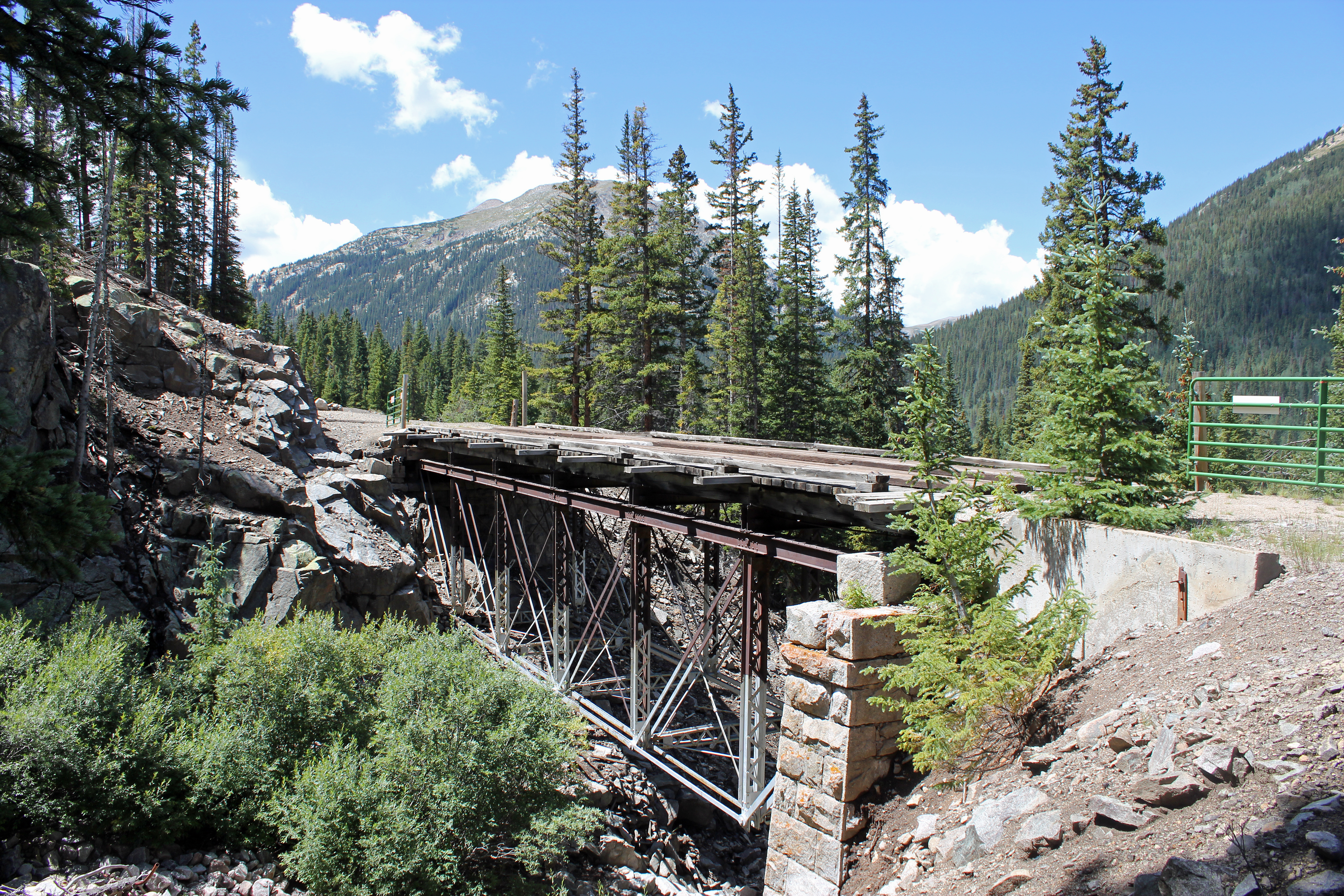
- Bridge in 2014

- Location within Colorado
- Location: Chaffee County Road 297 at milepost 2.40, Romley, Colorado
- Coordinates: 38.67508°N 106.36478°W
- Area: less than one acre
- Built: 1881
- Built by: Denver, South Park and Pacific Railroad
- Architectural style: Pratt deck truss
- MPS: Highway Bridges in Colorado MPS
- NRHP reference No.: 03000744
- Added to NRHP: August 14, 2003

The Morley Bridge, also known as the Romley Bridge, located near Romlee in Chaffee County, Colorado, is a wrought-iron pin-connected Pratt truss bridge that was built in 1881. It was listed on the National Register of Historic Places in 2003.

The bridge has a 13.2-foot-wide (4.0 m) timber deck roadway and is 83 feet (25 m) long, with a span of 80 feet (24 m) on its Pratt trusses. It has a timber deck and stone masonry wing walls and abutments. It was designed and constructed by Denver, South Park and Pacific Railroad, and was fabricated by New Jersey Steel and Iron Company (a company based in Trenton, New Jersey).

It was built as part of railway construction towards Alpine Pass in 1881 near what was then known as Morley ("also called Red Town because all the buildings were painted red, and later renamed Romley in 1897"). A tunnel at Alpine Pass was completed in 1882 and was then the highest elevation tunnel in North America. The first train from Nathrop, Colorado, to Gunnison, Colorado, went through in 1892. The railway served mines in the area until this section of railway was closed in 1926, and the bridge then was converted to a county road bridge. It carried vehicle traffic until 1992 when it was bypassed and was converted to a pedestrian bridge.

According to History Colorado, the bridge is Colorado's "oldest dateable vehicular truss" and "one of Colorado's most important spans". It is "one of the few remaining truss bridges [in Colorado] with both wrought and cast iron components, ... [and] also the only known pin-connected deck truss in the state.

The bridge spans Pomeroy Gulch, and is located off Chaffee County Road 297 at milepost 2.40, 2.2 miles (3.5 km) southwest of St. Elmo, Colorado.

== See also ==
- List of bridges documented by the Historic American Engineering Record in Colorado
