= Rifle Bridge =

Historic bridge in Colorado, US

- U.S. National Register of Historic Places
- Rifle Bridge and the Colorado River (2026)

- Location within Colorado
- Location: Off SR 6/24 over Colorado River, Rifle, Colorado
- Coordinates: 39.527841°N 107.781572°W
- Area: 0.2 acres (0.081 ha)
- Built: 1909
- Built by: Sheely, C.G.
- Architectural style: Pennsylvania/Parker Truss
- MPS: Vehicular Bridges in Colorado TR
- NRHP reference No.: 85000213
- Added to NRHP: February 4, 1985

The Rifle Bridge, over the Colorado River in Rifle, Colorado, was built in 1909. It was listed on the National Register of Historic Places in 1985.

It is a two-span steel through truss bridge, with one 12-panel Pennsylvania truss span and one 10-panel Parker truss span. It was assessed to be "situated poorly on a tight bend in the river and has required periodical maintenance to keep it in place. Despite construction of a concrete jetty in 1922 to divert the main channel, the Colorado continues to work against the pier and north abutment."

In a 1983 survey of Colorado's historic bridges, it was assessed that

The Rifle Bridge is historically significant as a regionally important crossing of the Colorado River - the most expensive contracted for [or] by Garfield County. Its Pennsylvania through span is the longest among the pinned trusses left in the state and is one of only two of its type in the survey; the Parker through is one of only two and is the longest of its type, and the two combined to form one bridge is unique. Erected by important Colorado bridge contractor C.G. Sheely, the Rifle Bridge is a visually striking long-span truss - one of Colorado's most significant vehicular bridges.

By then it was no longer in use for vehicular transportation.

It is located between what is now U.S. Highway 6 on the north side of the river, and Interstate 70 on the south.

== See also ==
- National Register of Historic Places listings in Garfield County, Colorado
