= Douglas Crossing Bridge =

- U.S. National Register of Historic Places
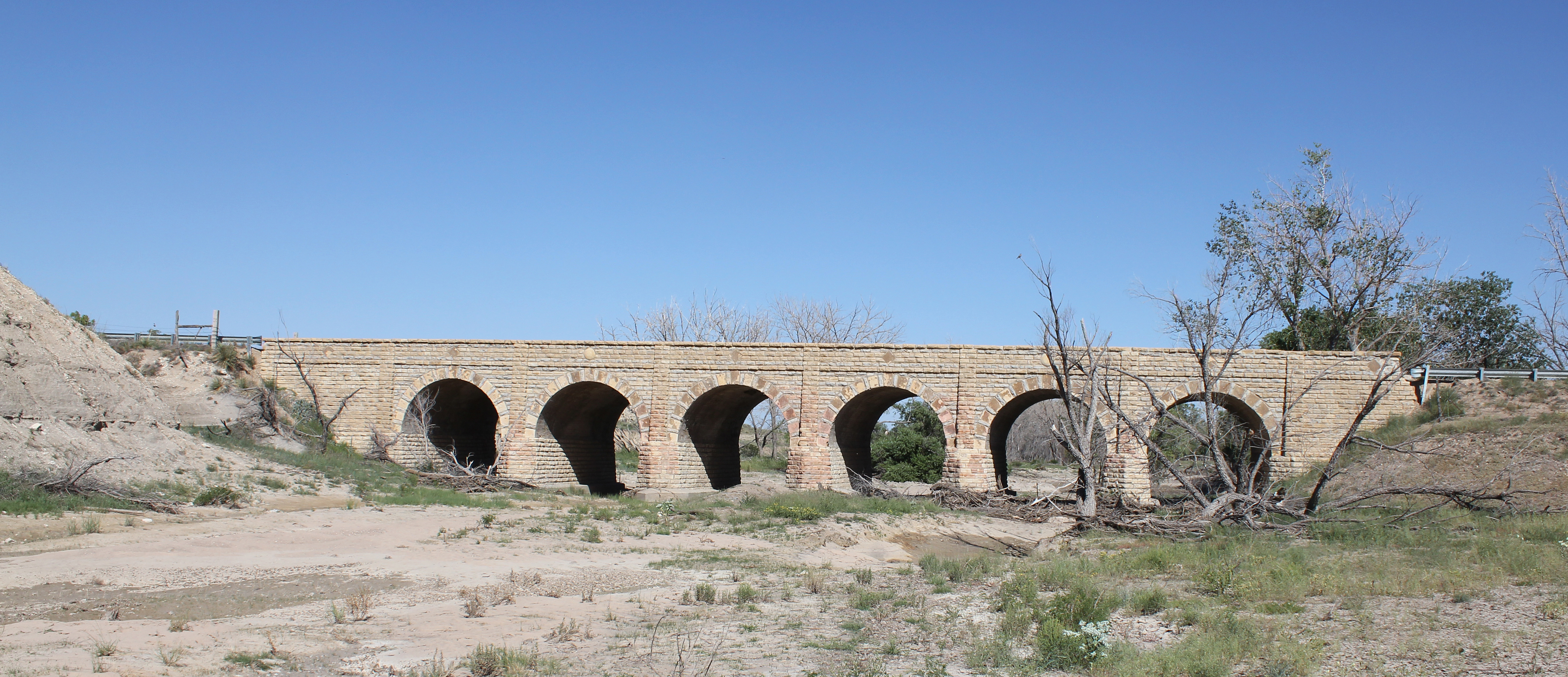

- Location within Colorado
- Nearest city: Granada, Colorado
- Coordinates: 37.79537°N 102.25577°W
- Area: 0.1 acres (0.040 ha)
- Built: 1936
- Built by: Works Progress Administration
- Architectural style: Stone Ashlar Filled Arch
- MPS: Vehicular Bridges in Colorado TR
- NRHP reference No.: 85000224
- Added to NRHP: February 4, 1985

The Douglas Crossing Bridge, near Granada, Colorado, was built in 1936 as a Works Progress Administration project. It was listed on the National Register of Historic Places in 1985.

It is located 19.5 miles (31.4 km) southeast of Granada. It brings County Road 28 over Two Butte Creek.

It is a stone, ashlar-filled arch bridge. It has six 14 feet (4.3 m) semi-circular span arches, and was built by an eight-man crew.
