= State Bridge, Colorado =

Unincorporated community in Eagle County, CO, USA

Coordinates: 39°51′28″N 106°38′59″W

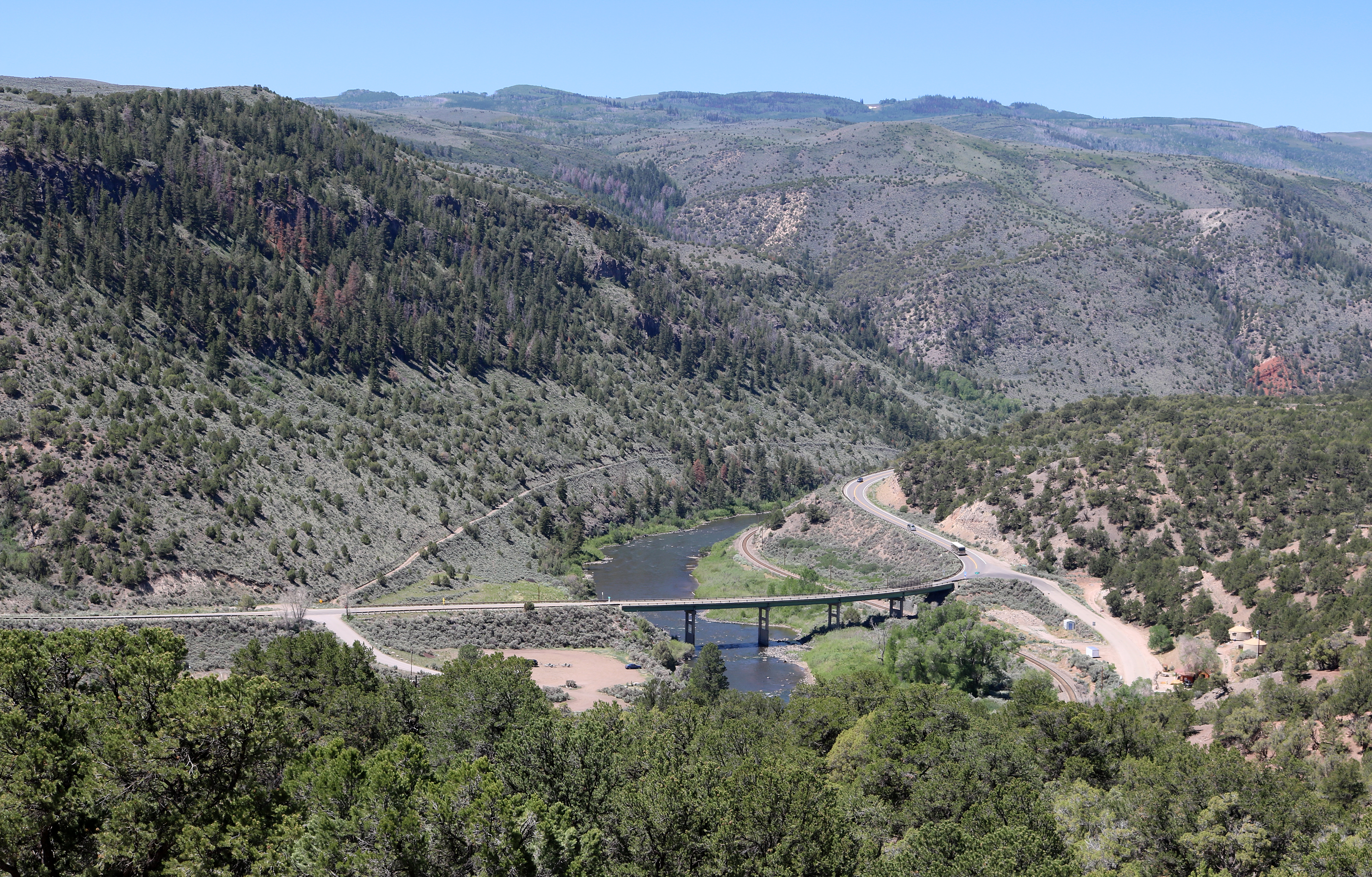
State Bridge viewed from Trough Road above the community

State Bridge is an unincorporated community in Eagle County, in the U.S. state of Colorado.

== History ==
A post office called State Bridge was established in 1909, and remained in operation until 1915. The community is named for a bridge near the town site.
