= Avondale Bridge (Arkansas River) =

- Formerly listed on the U.S. National Register of Historic Places
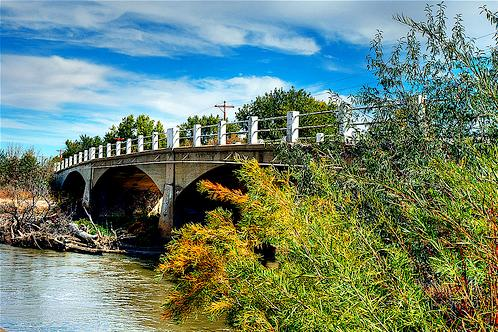

- Location within Colorado Location within the United States
- Location: Cty. Rd. 327, Avondale, Colorado
- Coordinates: 38°14′32″N 104°20′54″W
- Area: 0.1 acres (0.040 ha)
- Built: 1913
- Architect: Pueblo Bridge Co.
- Architectural style: Luten Arch
- MPS: Vehicular Bridges in Colorado TR
- NRHP reference No.: 85000225

Significant dates
- Added to NRHP: February 4, 1985
- Removed from NRHP: March 27, 2017

Avondale Bridge was located in Avondale, Colorado spanning the Arkansas River. It was listed on the National Historic Register of Places. It was a Luten Arch bridge built by the Pueblo Bridge Co. It was replaced in 2005.

== See also ==
- List of crossings of the Arkansas River
- National Register of Historic Places listings in Pueblo County, Colorado
