= Hay's Ranch Bridge =

- U.S. National Register of Historic Places
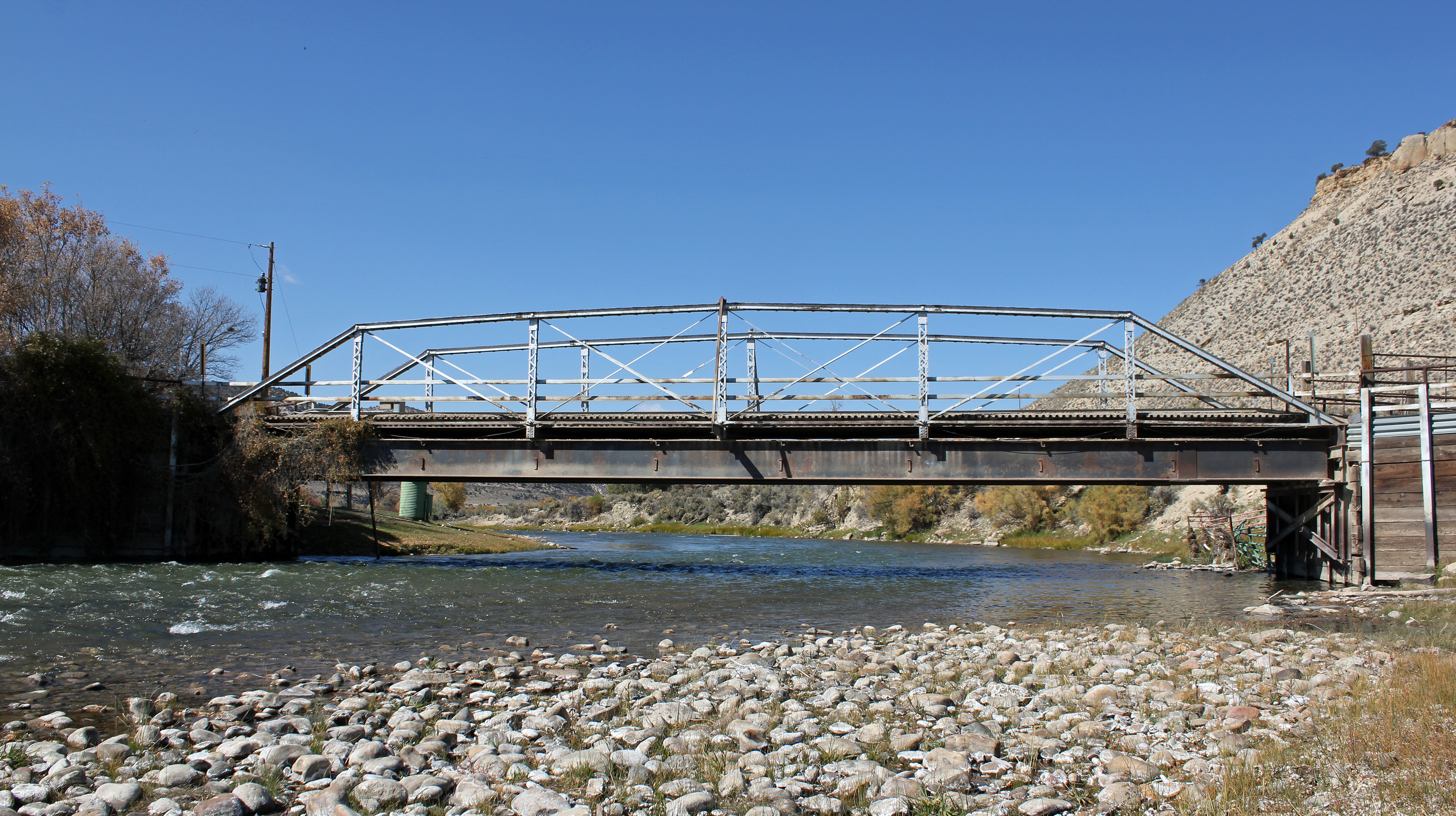

- Location within Colorado
- Nearest city: Meeker, Colorado
- Coordinates: 40°00′48″N 108°05′32″W
- Area: 0.1 acres (0.040 ha)
- Built: 1900-1901
- Built by: M. J. Patterson Contracting Co.
- Architectural style: Pratt Pony Truss
- MPS: Vehicular Bridges in Colorado TR
- NRHP reference No.: 85000233
- Added to NRHP: February 4, 1985

The Hay's Ranch Bridge, in Rio Blanco County, Colorado near Meeker, Colorado, was built in 1900–01. It was listed on the National Register of Historic Places in 1985.

It is a pin-connected, 6-panel steel Pratt pony truss bridge. It has a single 92 feet (28 m) span bringing County Road 127 over the White River.

Its steel was forged by Lackawanna and Carnegie and it was constructed by M. J. Patterson Contracting Co. of Denver.

It was documented by the Historic American Engineering Record in 1983.

It is located about 9.8 miles (15.8 km) west of Meeker.
