= List of tunnels documented by the Historic American Engineering Record in Colorado =

This is a list of tunnels documented by the Historic American Engineering Record in the U.S. state of Colorado.

== Tunnels ==
Survey No.	Name (as assigned by HAER)	Built	Documented	Carries	Crosses	Location	County	Coordinates
CO-4-A	Montezuma Valley Irrigation Company System, Tunnel	1885	1981	Montezuma Valley Irrigation Company canal	Dolores Divide	Dolores	Montezuma	
CO-29	Rim Rock Drive	1937	1994	Rim Rock Drive	Colorado National Monument	Fruita	Mesa	39°06′48″N 108°44′08″W
CO-80	Prater-Morefield Tunnel		1993	Mesa Verde National Park road	Prater Ridge	Cortez	Montezuma	37°17′06″N 108°25′08″W
CO-95	Uncompahgre Project, Gunnison Tunnel	1909	1973	Uncompahgre Project canal	Vernal Mesa	Montrose	Montrose	38°29′02″N 107°44′38″W
CO-101	Twin Tunnels	1961	2012	I-70	Clear Creek Canyon	Idaho Springs	Clear Creek	39°44′42″N 105°28′25″W

== See also ==
- List of bridges documented by the Historic American Engineering Record in Colorado
