= Wasson-McKay Place =

- U.S. National Register of Historic Places
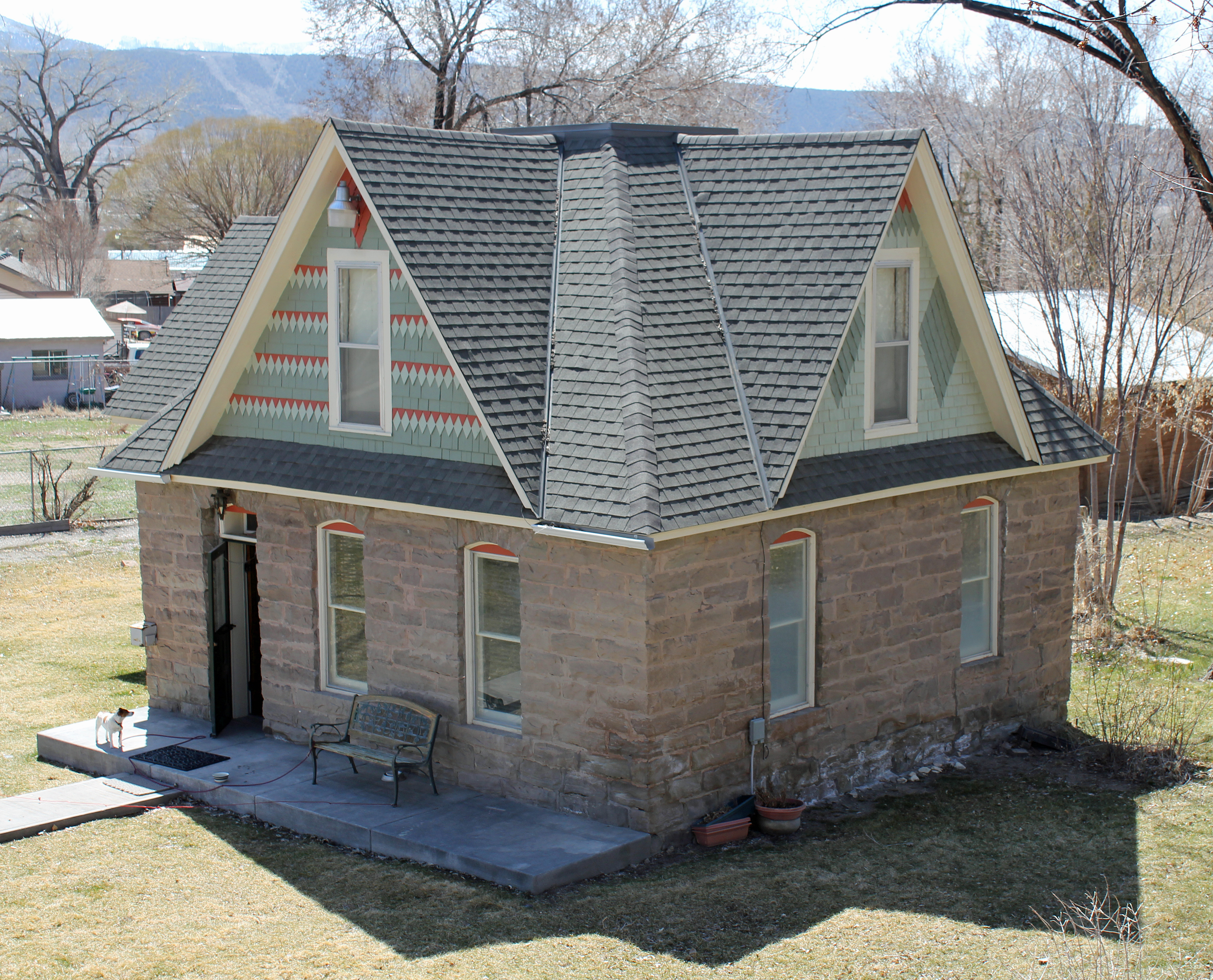

- Location within Colorado
- Location: 259 Cardinal Way, Parachute, Colorado
- Coordinates: 39°26′56″N 108°03′08″W
- Area: 1 acre (0.40 ha)
- Built: 1902
- Built by: Wilkinson, William
- Architectural style: Late Victorian, Pioneer Log
- NRHP reference No.: 10000536
- Added to NRHP: August 5, 2010

The Wasson-McKay Place, at 259 Cardinal Way in Parachute, Colorado, was built in 1902. It was listed on the National Register of Historic Places in 2010. The listing included two contributing buildings and a contributing site.

The property was considered a good example of a combination of pioneer log construction and Victorian style. An icehouse/cabin was built around 1900.

The house, built in 1902 of sandstone, has Late Victorian features in its steep roof with a jerkinhead, gabled dormer and other gabled projections, decorative cut shingles, and segmental arched windows. It was expanded by an ornamental concrete block addition to the south in 1909.
