= Prowers Bridge =

- U.S. National Register of Historic Places
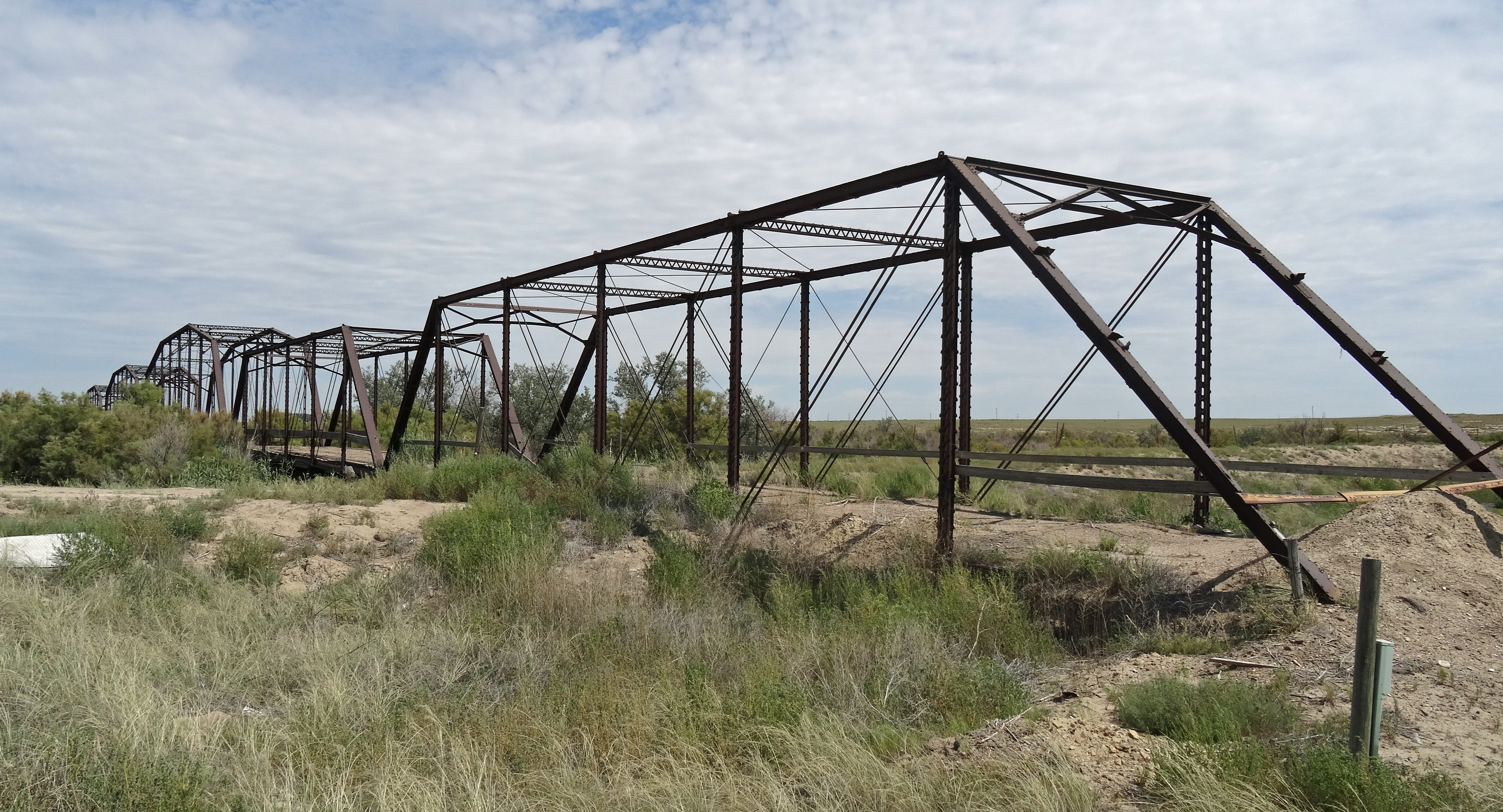
- The Bridge in 2013.

- Location within Colorado Location within the United States
- Location: County Road 34
- Nearest city: Prowers, Colorado
- Coordinates: 38°5′37″N 102°46′3″W
- Area: 0.3 acres (0.12 ha)
- Built: 1902
- Built by: Pueblo Bridge Co.
- Architectural style: Camelback & Pratt Through
- MPS: Vehicular Bridges in Colorado TR
- NRHP reference No.: 85000189
- Added to NRHP: February 4, 1985

The Prowers Bridge over the Arkansas River near Prowers, Colorado is a historic bridge that was built in 1902 by the Pueblo Bridge Co. It includes 3 Camelback truss, 2 Pratt through truss and one Pratt pony truss components. It was listed on the National Register of Historic Places in 1985.

It is the last surviving out of more than 6 multispan bridges built during 1890-1910 that crossed the wide floodplains of the lower Arkansas River.
