= Satank Bridge =

Metal truss bridge in Colorado, US

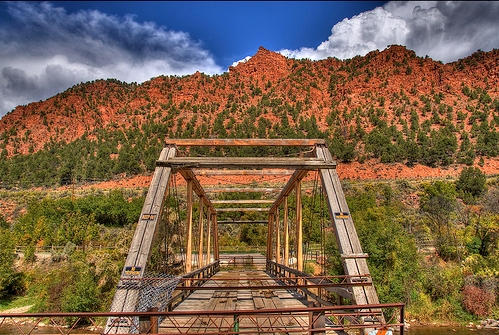
- Satank Bridge in 2008
- Coordinates: 39°25′01″N 107°13′50″W
- Crosses: Roaring Fork River
- Locale: Satank, Colorado, United States
- Other name: Pink Bridge
- Owner: Garfield County Board of County Commissioners

Characteristics
- Design: Pratt truss
- Material: Iron, steel (post-2011), and timber
- Total length: 102 feet (31 m)
- Width: 13 feet 7 inches (4.14 m)
- Height: 17 feet (5.2 m)

History
- Designer: Fred H. Bullen
- Constructed by: Pueblo Bridge Company
- Construction cost: $2,325 (equivalent to $72,000 in 2024)
- Opened: 1900
- Satank Bridge
- U.S. National Register of Historic Places
- Colorado State Register of Historic Properties
- Location: Satank, Colorado, United States
- Coordinates: 39°25′1″N 107°13′50″W
- Built: 1900
- Restored: 2010–2011
- Restored by: Gould Construction
- NRHP reference No.: 85000211
- CSRHP No.: 5GF.1282
- Added to NRHP: February 4, 1985

Location
- Interactive map of Satank Bridge

Satank Bridge is a steel and timber Pratt through truss bridge in Garfield County, Colorado, United States. The bridge crosses the Roaring Fork River at the unincorporated community of Satank near the town of Carbondale and sits on a trail connecting Glenwood Springs to Aspen in the Roaring Fork Valley. Designed by Fred H. Bullen and constructed by his Pueblo Bridge Company in May 1900, the Satank Bridge spans 102 ft (31 m) and is 14 ft (4.3 m) wide.

Garfield County's government, who contracted for the bridge's original construction, sponsored a restoration effort undertaken in 2010 and 2011. The restoration of the bridge – by then the sole example of a timber Pratt through truss in public use in Colorado – was partially funded by History Colorado in what was then that organization's largest single-project grant. Steel supports replaced portions of Satank Bridge's original iron construction by the Gould Construction restorers. The bridge has been listed on the National Register of Historic Places since 1985 and is listed on the Colorado State Register of Historic Properties.

== Description ==
The Satank Bridge is a single-span Pratt through truss bridge over the Roaring Fork River in Garfield County, Colorado. The bridge was built to connect the unincorporated community of Satank and the town of Carbondale with Glenwood Springs and the rest of the Roaring Fork Valley by road. The bridge is owned by the Garfield County Board of County Commissioners.

== History ==
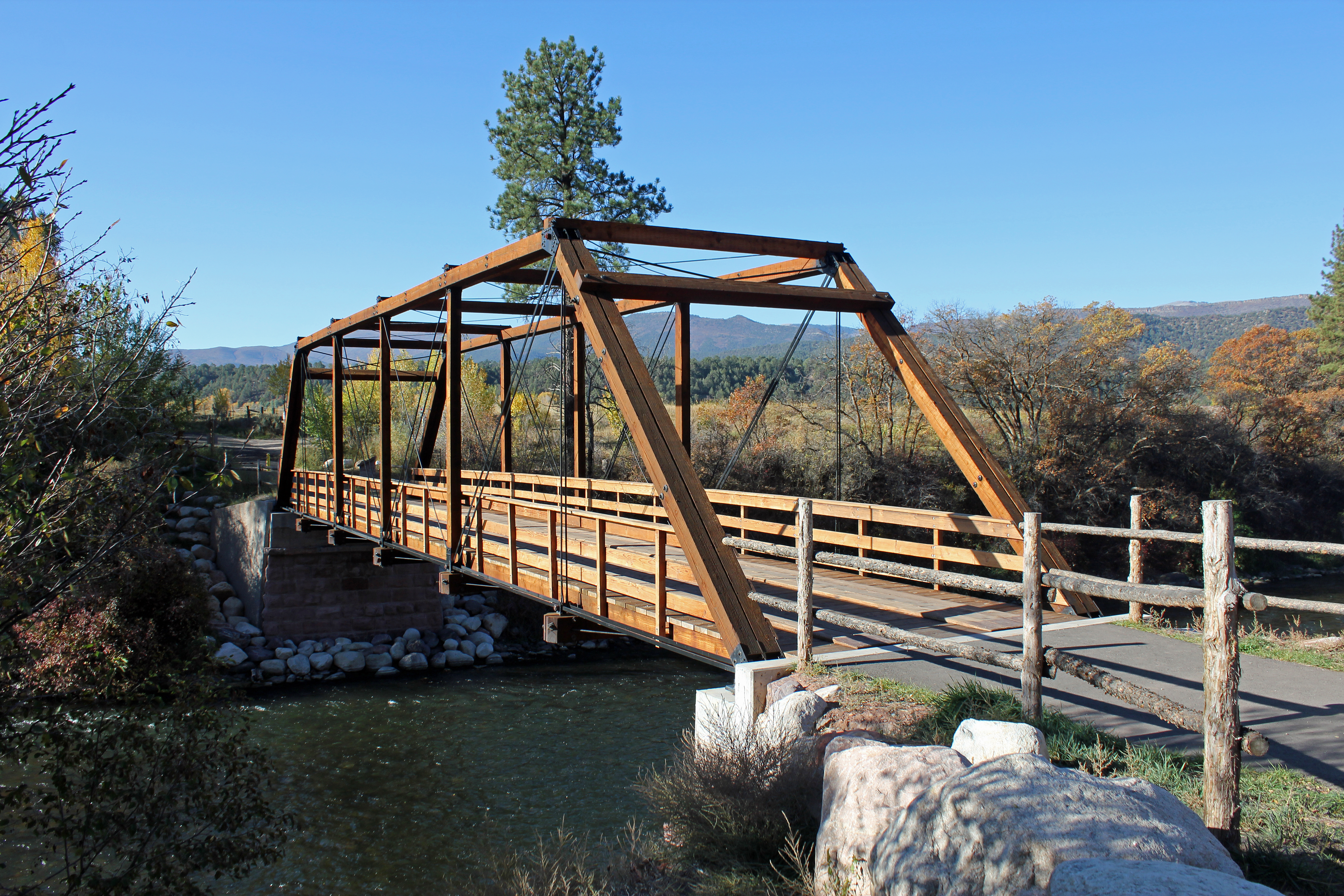
The restored bridge in 2012

In February 1900, the Garfield County Board of Commissioners announced that it was seeking proposals for a replacement to a timber and iron Howe truss bridge north of Satank to cross the Roaring Fork River. Unsuccessful bids were submitted by the Midlands Bridge Company of Kansas City, Standard Bridge Company of Omaha, Broughton and Morrill of Pueblo, Colorado. The Pueblo Bridge Company, also from Pueblo, submitted the winning bid of a $2,325 (equivalent to $72,000 in 2024) Pratt through truss bridge built with timber and steel. The bridge's stone abutments had been built by May 7 and the bridge was completed a week later.

In May 1917, the county commissioners indicated that they hoped to raise Satank Bridge and grade its approaches. During a meeting, the commissioners said that they could not afford those changes during that year. Residents of Carbondale present at the meeting then volunteered themselves to privately raise $300 (equivalent to $8,000 in 2025) to assist with the costs, which the county accepted. The bridge was raised about 3 ft (0.91 m). The raising, which included installing concrete additions to the piers, was completed by June and was followed by grading.

Already among the oldest roadway truss bridges in Colorado by 1983, the Satank Bridge had become the only surviving public timber Pratt through truss bridge upon the Virginia Dale Bridge's demolition. When it was surveyed for the Historic American Buildings Survey/Historic American Engineering Record in 1983, the bridge remained in good condition and was recognized as for its significance as a remnant among Coloradan bridges. The bridge was added to the National Register of Historic Places as a site of engineering significance on February 4, 1985. The bridge is also on the Colorado State Register of Historic Properties.

By 2010, the bridge had developed significant structural deterioration. In 1994, the bridge had been closed to vehicular traffic, with pedestrians prohibited from crossing the bridge starting in 2003. Also in 2003, Colorado Preservation, Inc. put the bridge on its list of endangered places.

Restoration work funded by Garfield County and a History Colorado grant began in 2010. At $297,500 ($408,000 in 2024), the History Colorado grant was the largest ever given by the society to a single project. The total cost of the restoration was estimated to be at least $750,000 ($1.03 million in 2024). A ribbon cutting ceremony for the reopened bridge was performed on May 12, 2011. The restoration work was performed by Gould Construction, with two minor cracks in the iron trussing fixed with welding and iron support beams replaced with steel ones.

== See also ==
- National Register of Historic Places listings in Garfield County, Colorado
