= F Street Bridge (Salida, Colorado) =

Bridge in Salida, Colorado, United States

- U.S. National Register of Historic Places
- Colorado State Register of Historic Properties
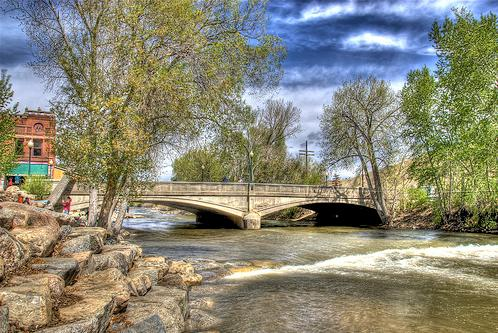

- Location within Colorado Location within the United States
- Location: F St., Salida, Colorado
- Coordinates: 38.53774°N 105.99035°W
- Area: 0.1 acres (0.040 ha)
- Built: 1907
- Architect: Denver & Rio Grande Railroad; Pueblo Bridge Co.
- Architectural style: Luten Arch
- MPS: Vehicular Bridges in Colorado TR
- NRHP reference No.: 85000192
- CSRHP No.: 5CF.406.75
- Added to NRHP: February 4, 1985

The F Street Bridge in Salida, Colorado is a closed spandrel concrete arch bridge built in 1907 by the Pueblo Bridge Company. The design also known as a Luten Arch bridge was patented in 1907 by Daniel Luten. The bridge has two spans each with length of 60 feet (18 m), and 128 feet (39 m) in total. It is believed to be the first bridge of this type built by the company.

It spans the Arkansas River in a park setting.

== See also ==
- National Register of Historic Places listings in Chaffee County, Colorado
