= Manitou Springs Bridges =

- U.S. National Register of Historic Places
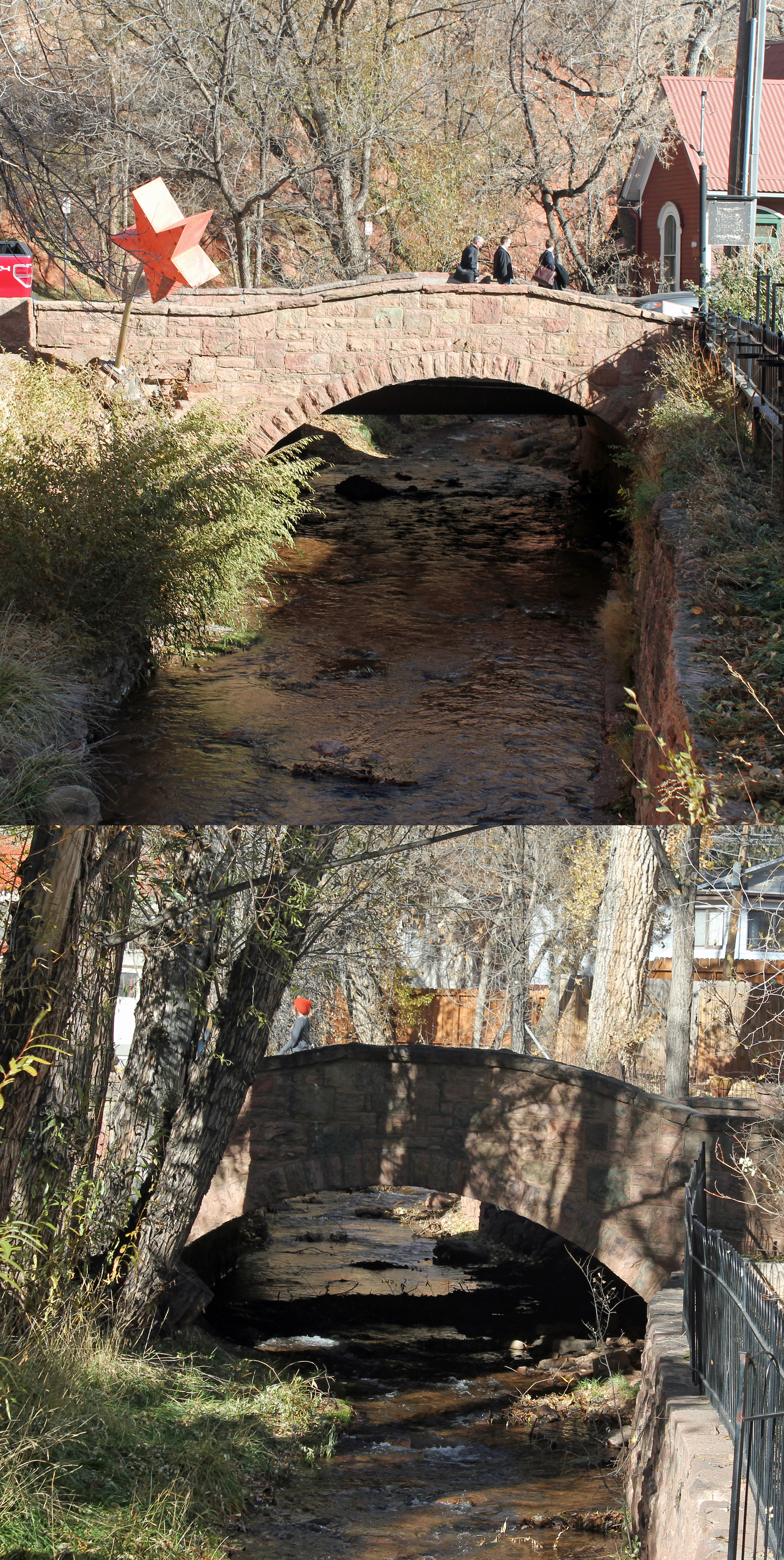

- Location within Colorado Location within the United States
- Location: Park Avenue and Cannon Avenue over Fountain Creek, Manitou Springs, Colorado
- Coordinates: 38.85845°N 104.9167°W
- NRHP reference No.: 85001398
- Added to NRHP: 1985

Manitou Springs Bridges are historic bridges are located on Park and Canon Avenues over Fountain Creek in Manitou Springs, Colorado. The bridges are on the National Register of Historic Places.

The Canon Avenue Bridge was built of Manitou greenstone in 1906. Also built of greenstone, the Park Avenue bridge was built in 1907.

== See also ==
- Manitou Springs Historic District
- List of Manitou Springs Historic District buildings
