= Huerfano Bridge =

- U.S. National Register of Historic Places
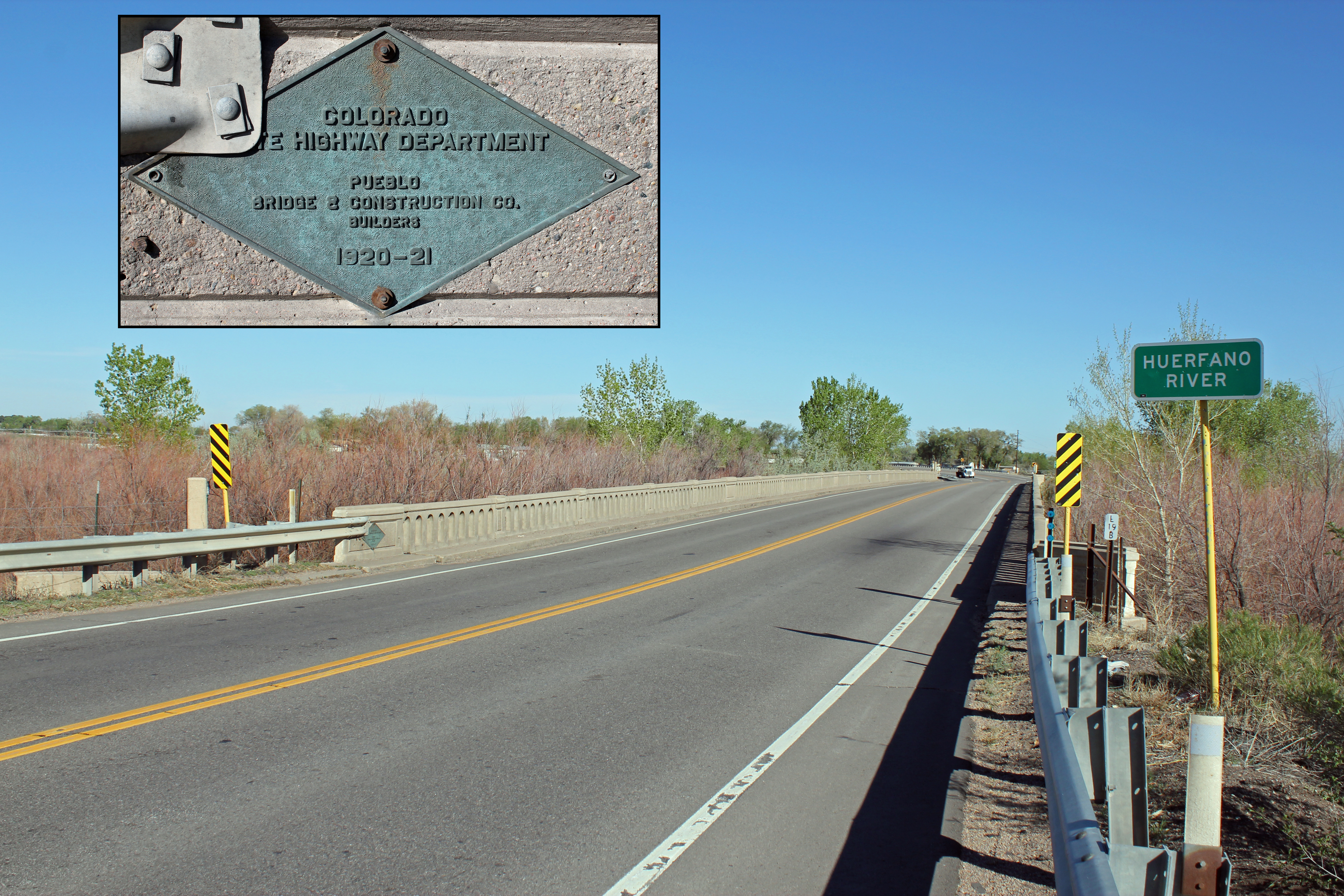

- Location within Colorado
- Nearest city: Boone, Colorado
- Coordinates: 38.22553°N 104.26142°W
- Area: 0.3 acres (0.12 ha)
- Built: 1921
- Engineer: Robert Dubois; Pueblo Bridge Co.
- Architectural style: Filled spandrel arch
- MPS: Vehicular Bridges in Colorado TR
- NRHP reference No.: 85000226
- Added to NRHP: February 4, 1985

The Huerfano Bridge, is a bridge in Pueblo County, Colorado near Boone, Colorado that brings U.S. Highway 50 over the Huerfano River. The bridge was completed in 1921 after construction began in 1920. It was listed on the National Register of Historic Places in 1985.

It is a five-span filled spandrel arch bridge designed by Colorado state staff engineer Richard Dubois and was built by the Pueblo Bridge Co. A previous bridge had been christened by the community in 1916. It replaced a timber truss bridge that had deteriorated severely by 1920, with two spans having fallen from damage by woodpeckers.
