= Madrid, Colorado =

- Ghost town
- Location within Colorado Location within the United States
- Coordinates: 37°07′39″N 104°38′29″W
- Country: United States
- State: Colorado
- County: Las Animas
- Elevation: 6,286 ft (1,916 m)
- Postal code: 81082
- Area code: 719

Madrid is a ghost town in Las Animas County, Colorado, United States. It is east of the Front Range of the Rocky Mountains at an elevation of 6,590 feet (2,010 m). The town is the west side of the county along State Highway 12, fourteen miles (23 km) west of Trinidad. Madrid is named for Hilario Madrid, who settled there in the 19th century from New Mexico, not after Spain's capital. Originally called Madrid Plaza, it was established as a settler's post in 1864. Hilario and his brother Juan Madrid homesteaded there in September 1879. There was a Post Office in the town from 1882 to 1917.

== See also ==
- List of ghost towns in Colorado
