= South Platte River Bridges =

- U.S. National Register of Historic Places
- Colorado State Register of Historic Properties
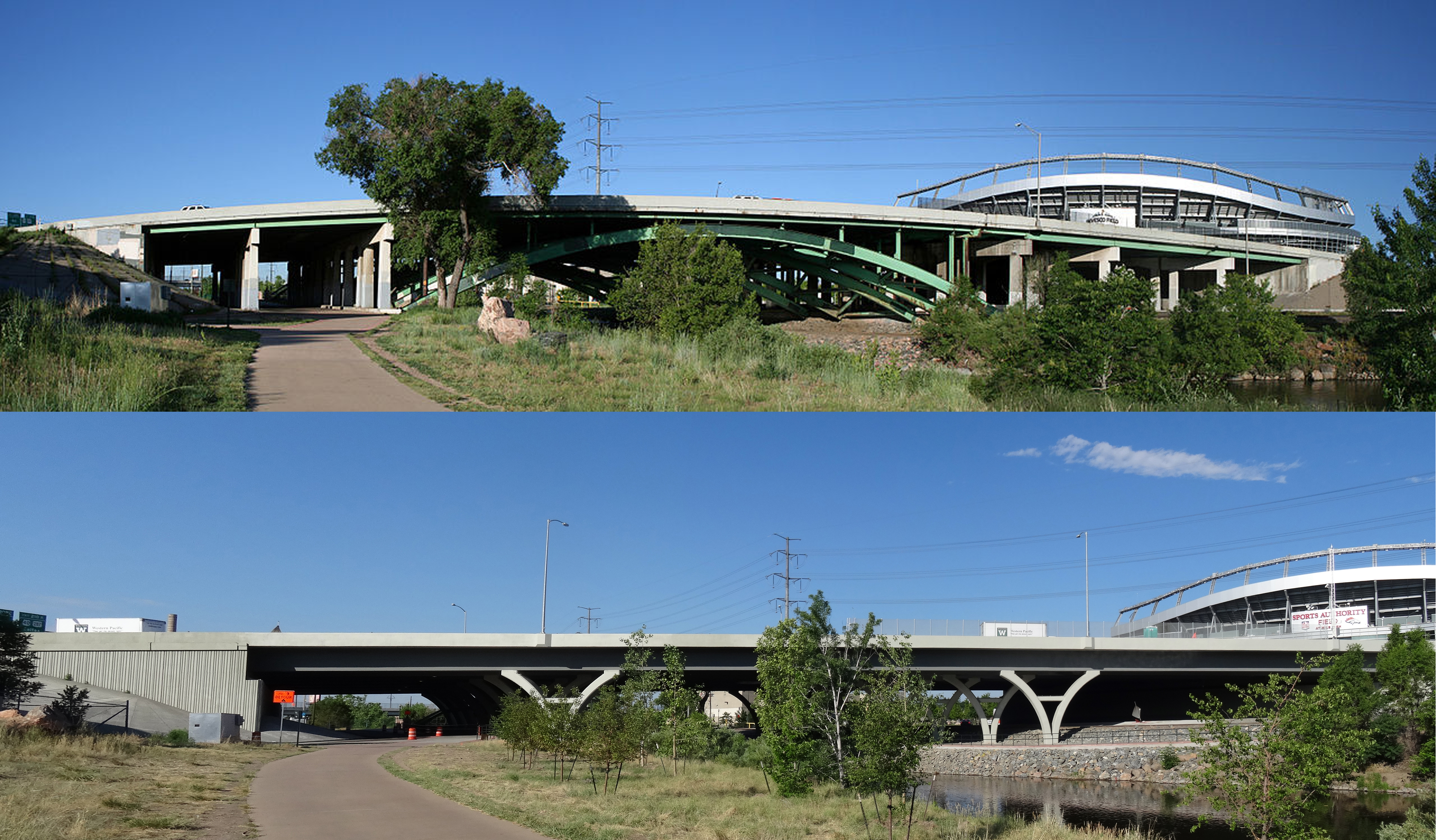
- Old and new South Platte River Bridges

- Location within Colorado Location within the United States
- Nearest city: Denver, Colorado
- Coordinates: 39°44′36″N 105°0′56″W
- Area: 1.6 acres (0.65 ha)
- Built: 1951
- Architect: Crocker & Ryan; et al.
- Architectural style: Girder-ribbed deck arch
- MPS: Highway Bridges in Colorado MPS
- NRHP reference No.: 02001128
- CSRHP No.: 5DV.7072
- Added to NRHP: October 15, 2002

South Platte River Bridges (also known as the Bronco Arch Bridge) were a pair of historic arch bridges that carried Denver's Valley Highway, since designated Interstate 25, over the South Platte River. Between May 2011 and August 2013, these bridges were replaced due to deterioration of the structures.
