= St. Charles Bridge (Pueblo, Colorado) =

- U.S. National Register of Historic Places
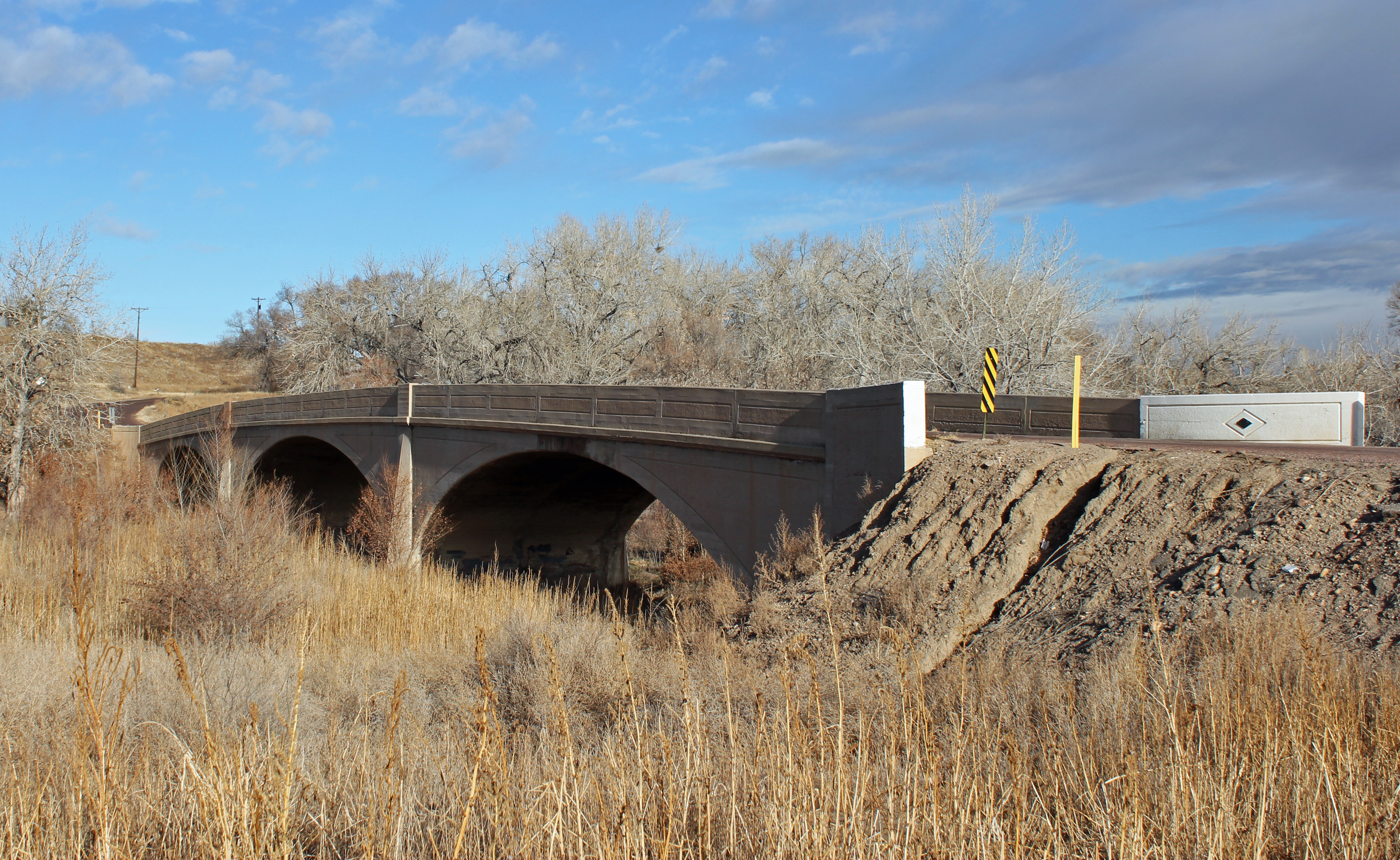
- Bridge in 2014

- Location within Colorado Location within the United States
- Nearest city: Pueblo, Colorado
- Coordinates: 38°12′03″N 104°32′46″W
- Area: 0.1 acres (0.040 ha)
- Built: 1924
- Built by: Salle Construction Co.
- Architectural style: Filled spandrel arch
- MPS: Vehicular Bridges in Colorado TR
- NRHP reference No.: 85000228
- Added to NRHP: February 4, 1985

The St. Charles Bridge near Pueblo, Colorado which brings Pueblo County Road 65 over the St. Charles River, was built in 1924. It is a filled spandrel arch bridge. It was listed on the National Register of Historic Places in 1985.

It has three 91 feet (28 m) spans achieving a total bridge length of 251 feet (77 m) with a roadway almost 20 feet (6.1 m) wide. Salle Construction Company won competitive bidding to construct either a steel or concrete structure for its bid of $39,077. The company "used a reinforced concrete vault system to excavate for the foundations, an unusual method which they later patented." The bridge was completed during February to late June 1924.

It is one of the longest filled spandrel arch bridges in Colorado.
