= Sevenmile Bridge =

- U.S. National Register of Historic Places
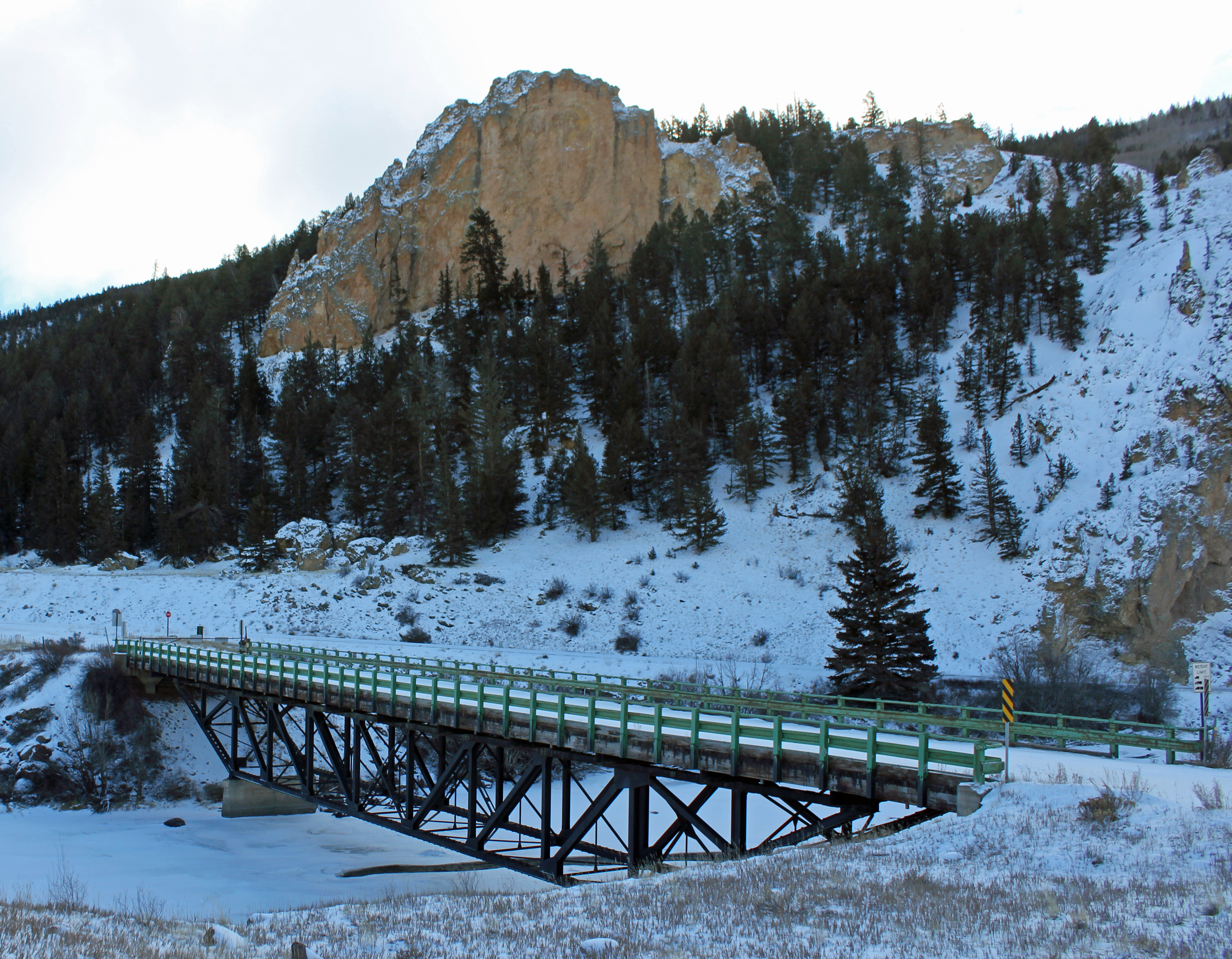
- The bridge in late 2014.

- Location within Colorado Location within the United States
- Location: County Rd. 6 miles SW of Creede, Creede, Colorado
- Coordinates: 37°47′33″N 106°58′51″W
- Built: 1935
- Architect: Burghardt, King
- Architectural style: Pratt deck truss
- MPS: Vehicular Bridges in Colorado TR
- NRHP reference No.: 85001552
- Added to NRHP: July 11, 1985

The Sevenmile Bridge is a Pratt deck truss bridge bringing a county road over the Rio Grande, 6 miles (10 km) southwest of Creede, Colorado, United States. It was designed by engineer King Burghardt and is unusual for its cantilevered ends. It was built in 1935; it then carried State Highway 149. It has also been known as Bridge over Rio Grande River. It was listed on the National Register of Historic Places in 1985.

In 1981 ownership of the bridge was transferred to Mineral County. The bridge provides access to Marshall Park Campground.
