= Garfield County Library District =

Public library system located in western Colorado, United States

- Location: 207 East Ave, Rifle, CO 81650, United States
- Type: Public
- Established: 1938
- Branches: 6

Access and use
- Population served: 58,887

Other information
- Director: Brett Lear
- Website: gcpld.org

The Garfield County Library District is a public library system in western Colorado, United States.

The library district serves the unincorporated areas in Garfield County, Colorado. Additionally, the library district partners with cities and towns to manage their libraries. The district operates 6 libraries. In 2019, the district had 580,725 visitors and checked out 362,164 books, eBooks, magazines, and media (DVDs, CDs, audiobooks). The district also hosts many events, mostly for children.

== Branches ==
The library system contains six branches, all introduced between 1938 and 1980.

- Carbondale Library (1964), Carbondale
- Glenwood Springs Library (1969), Glenwood Springs
- New Castle Library (1938), New Castle
- Parachute Library (1982), Parachute
- Rifle Library (1976), Rifle
- Silt Library (1980), Silt

== History ==
The first library in the district was established in 1938 as a Works Progress Administration (WPA) project in New Castle, Colorado. This library served the entire county and had about 14,000 books. The Garfield County Commissioners took over funding the library system after the WPA was discontinued.
