= Battlement Mesa =

Mountain in Colorado, United States

Coordinates: 39°21′31″N 107°54′53″W

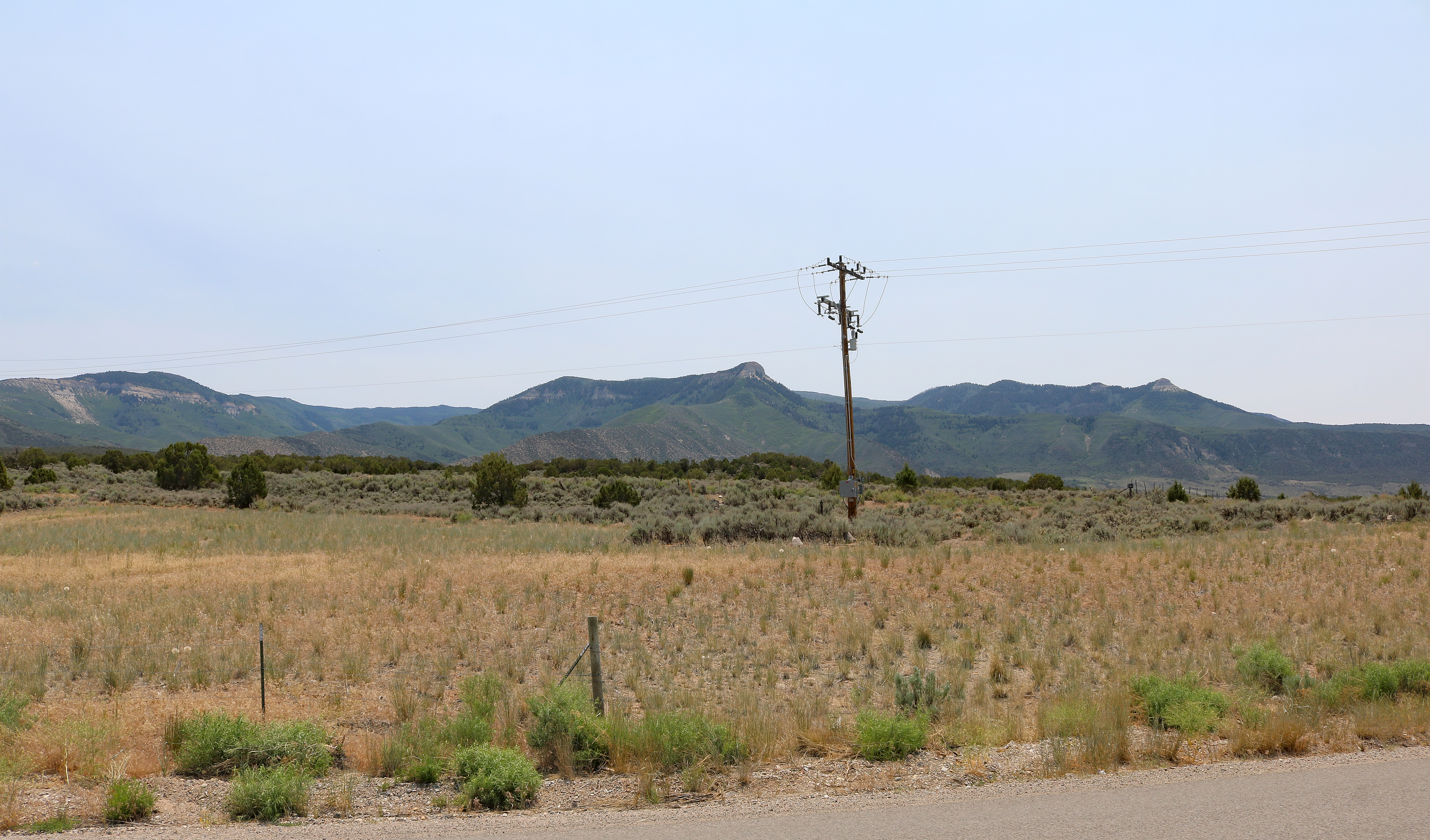
A view south towards Battlement Mesa from the intersection of Morrisania Mesa Road and County Road 309 in Garfield County,

Battlement Mesa is a large prominent mesa in western Colorado in the United States. It sits along the Garfield-Mesa county line, between the Colorado River to the north and Plateau Creek to the south.

It is visible south of Interstate 70, visible between the towns of Rifle and Parachute, stretching for approximately 15 miles (24 km) east-west. The community of Battlement Mesa along Interstate 70 takes its name from the mesa.

The mesa is similar in geology to the nearby Grand Mesa to the south, and to the Roan Cliffs to the north. It consists largely of a layer of basalt atop underlying layers of sedimentary rock, including a layer of the Green River Formation.
