= Sisyphus Shelter =

Archaeological site in Colorado, US

Coordinates: 39.3763°N 108.1613°W

Sisyphus Shelter is an archaeological site that was uncovered in Colorado when the Colorado Department of Highways was working on I-70. The excavation of this site became a joint project between the Colorado Department of Highways and the Bureau of Land Management. Fieldwork on the site was completed in 1980. Archaeologists John Gooding and Wm. Lane Shields as well as many others completed the excavation and prepared a comprehensive site report. Over the course of the fieldwork on Sisyphus Shelter, twenty-six features of human origin were discovered as well as numerous stone artifacts and two perishable items. The artifacts appeared to be all Late Archaic in origin. Dating indicated a range of occupations from modern times to 4400 B.P. being the oldest sample. Gooding and Shields (1985) suggest that the occupations of the shelter were not consistent and affected by seasonal changes.

== Location ==
Sisyphus Shelter was found because the purposed realignment of westbound I-70 put the interstate directly through the site. Sisyphus Shelter is a rock shelter made up of two individual shelters with a natural enclosure of fallen rocks. It is located in Garfield County, Colorado, in the Grand Valley about halfway between Rifle and Grand Junction. Gooding and Shields (1985) note that a reference point was used to measure an elevation of 1570.3 m (5151.9 ft) above sea level. Two of the nearby dominant features are Battlement Mesa and the Colorado River. Battlement Mesa is approximately 11.2 km (approximately 7 miles) to the southeast of the site and the Colorado River is about 1.5 km (approximately .9 mile) to the southeast. Gooding and Shields used two nearby archaeological sites for comparison. These were the DeBeque Rockshelter, another rockshelter like Sisyphus Shelter, and Kewclaw Site, an excavated open pit-house.

== Environment ==
The area surrounding Sisyphus Shelter is composed of a low elevation pinyon-juniper woodland community. This consists mainly of Utah Juniper, Pinyon Pine, big sagebrush and Mormon Tea. Close by is a cottonwood forest community, along the Colorado River, and a low elevation big sagebrush community, north of the site along gentle slopes. The cottonwood area is composed of broadleaf cottonwood, rabbitbrush, skunkbrush, and big sagebrush.

The geology of the area is mainly composed of tan sandstone with imbedded gray shales. Gooding and Shields note that in this type of area, outcroppings form slopes and lead to a badlands form of topography. According to these archaeologists, rockshelters, such as DeBeque Rockshelter and Sisyphus Shelter, are commonly formed in this type of terrain. Sisyphus Shelter itself is formed of sandstone that is gray to tan. Below this is green mudstone.

The shelter’s proximity to the Colorado River affords moisture for the plants and animals in the area. Rainfall is extremely variable due to the semi-arid climate of this section of Colorado. Temperatures in the area have an average range of between 20°C in July and -6°C to -8°C in January. Gooding and Shields point out that the actual temperatures in the shelter would have been higher because it faces south. Several test core samples were taken from various points in the site before excavation was started in order to determine dates and gather other paleo-environmental data. From these samples, pollen was extracted as well as any other elements that could be carbon dated.

== Artifacts and features ==
The artifacts found at Sisyphus shelter can be classified as stone tools, projectile points (arrowheads and spearheads) and two perishable items. 99% of all the artifacts found were made of stone. These artifacts were found within various levels of excavation ranging from level I at the deepest to level X just under the surface. The features discovered consist of hearths, two pits, one alignment of post holes in a tripod configuration and one habitation. All artifacts and samples from the site are located at the University of Colorado Museum of Natural History.

The stone tools and projectile points were made from materials such as chalcedony, chert, quartzite, metasediment and sandstone. All but two of the 23 projectile points are made from chert or chalcedony, with two quartzite projectile points also found. Out of the group of stone tools, only a few biface (shaped edges on both sides) knives were found and these were made from chert or chalcedony.

The categories of stone artifacts found include cutting tools, scraping tools, incising tools, striking tools, and many flakes that were used for various purposes. The cutting tools were most numerous having 131 specimens. These included 23 projectile points, 37 knives, 13 multi-functional tools, 20 blades, 3 backed blades, 2 drills and 33 biface fragments. The scraping tools consisted of 31 specimens, which varied in their purpose and the location of the scraping edge. The incising tools were least numerous with 22 specimens.

The perishable artifacts found at Sisyphus Shelter consisted of a fragment of basketry and an arrow shaft with a nock. Gooding and Shield note that these appeared to originate from the last occupation of the site about 580-520 B.P. The archaeologists were unable to determine the material the arrow shaft fragment was composed of; however, a reinforced collar around the nock was found to be made of yucca. The basketry fragment was also composed of yucca.

Most of the hearths found, along with the tripod, were associated with the habitation structure, which was the largest feature of the site. The tripod that was discovered was not related to any of the hearths so the archeologists speculate that instead of being used for cooking this was used as a type of backrest like those used by historic aboriginal populations. The two pits discovered were not thought to be used for fire. One appeared to be a storage pit and the other an ash pit. 18 hearths were found on many different levels showing different occupations of humans. The hearths consisted of surface hearths and basin hearths, basin hearths being the most common and also the most sophisticated.

== Interpretations and conclusions ==
The chronology of Sisyphus Shelter is determined to have been between 4400 B.P. and 500 B.P.. The archaeologists interpreted that Sisyphus Shelter was mainly used as a winter shelter. This was determined by the fact that the site is south-facing and located on sandstone benches above the river basin. Because of this it is not open to direct exposure during the winter, being blocked from wind and storms. Another consideration is that during summer months Sisyphus Shelter did not offer shade from the sun while the shelter form and hearth placement allowed for a heat shield in the winter so that activities could go on protected from much of the cold. Gooding and Shields also note that the area of the Grand Valley in which Sisyphus Shelter is located is an established winter range for deer. From a broader climatic perspective, the site was more intensely used during periods of warm, dry climate and less during wetter and possibly colder climates.

The archaeologists point out seven defined occupational periods using dates from Sisyphus Shelter in correlation with dates at the nearby sites of DeBeque Rockshelter and the Kewclaw Site, as well as other Colorado archaeological sites in further surrounding areas. The earliest occupation at Sisyphus Shelter (4400-4100 B.P.) was predated by occupations at other sites in the area. The second occupation (3700-3600 B.P.) was much less intense than others with only one hearth built, however the artifacts from these dates show little change from the first occupation. The third occupation (3400-3200 B.P.) relates to dates from many other rockshelter sites suggesting that at this point in time, rockshelters were desirable sites across the Colorado Plateau.

Between the first three occupations of this site and the remaining occupations there is a gap occurring between 3200 and 2400 years ago. This is significant because all the dates from the Kewclaw archaeological site fall within this range, suggesting a shift from rockshelter habitation to living in basin houses located in open areas. This break in habitation at Sisyphus Shelter also occurred during a time of climate shift from wetter and possibly cooler conditions during the third occupation to a very warm and dry climate during the fourth occupation.

The habitation structure was built during the fourth occupation of Sisyphus Shelter between 2410 B.P. and 2400 B.P., which suggests the introduction of more complex cultural elements. This slab-lined dwelling is unique to the cultural record of the area though there appears to have been a habitation structure at the Kewclaw site as well.

The fifth occupation (2100-1850 B.P.), in comparison, illustrated a return to rockshelter habitations with fewer types of stone used for tools than was seen in the fourth occupation. The sixth (1210-1010 B.P.) and seventh (580-520 B.P.) occupations correlate with large numbers of dates from the surrounding four counties and have the most animal remains, showing a wide range of mammals used by the inhabitants.

Sisyphus Shelter is late Archaic falling into the Uncompahgre Technocomplex which can be understood as a kind of sub-alpine, desert archaic. The artifacts found support this by the nature of having a retouch flake technology. This inclusion into the Uncompahgre Technocomplex illustrates the level of cultural development of the inhabitants of this and other sites within this specific geographical area.
