= Mount Logan (Garfield County, Colorado) =

Mountain in Colorado, United States

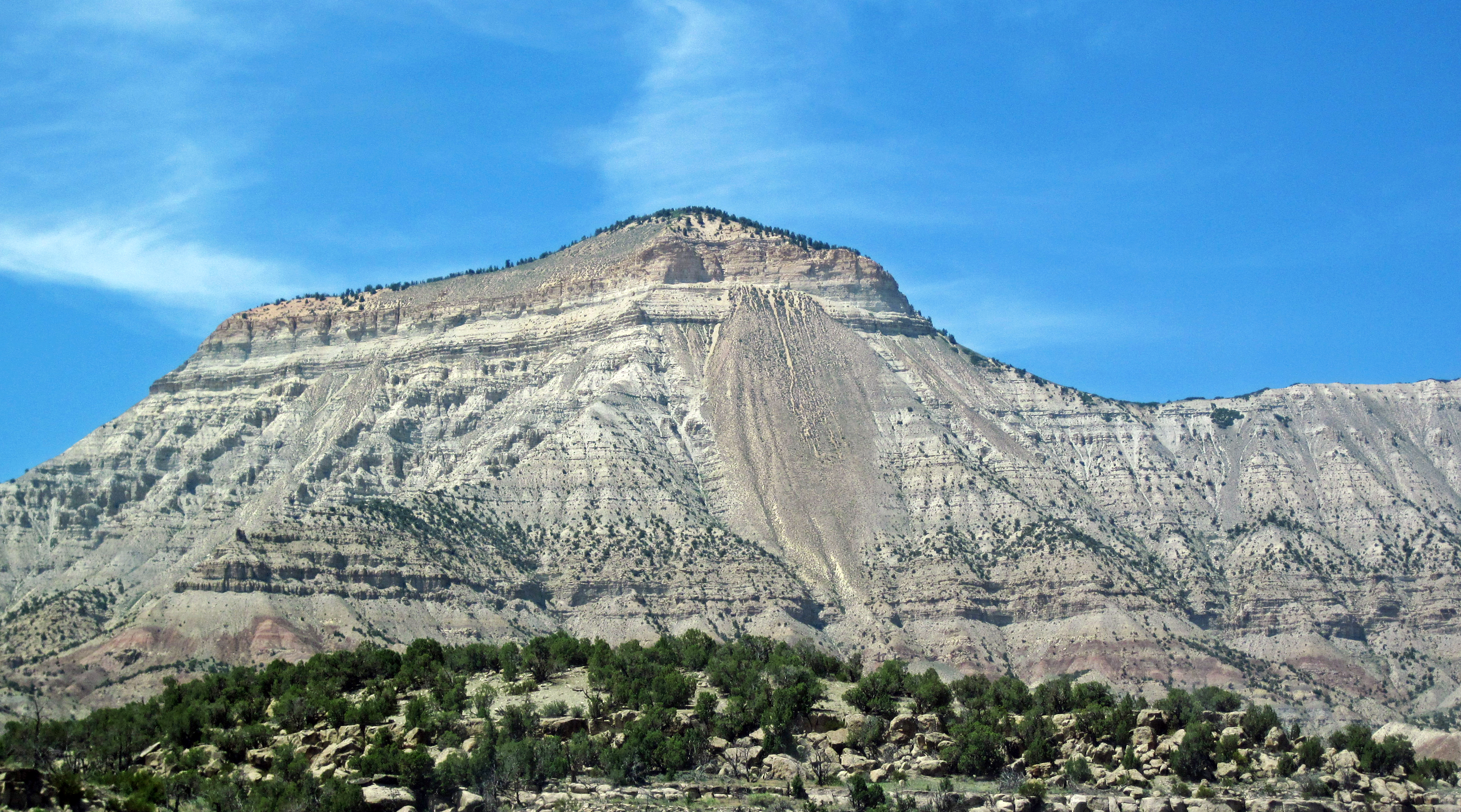
- Southeast aspect

Highest point
- Elevation: 8,413 ft (2,564 m)
- Prominence: 973 ft (297 m)
- Isolation: 2.73 mi (4.39 km)
- Coordinates: 39°24′06″N 108°11′18″W

Geography
- Location within Colorado Location within the United States
- Location: Garfield County, Colorado, U.S.
- Parent range: Colorado Plateau
- Topo map: USGS Red Pinnacle

Geology
- Rock age: Eocene
- Rock type: Sedimentary rock

Climbing
- Easiest route: class 2 scrambling

Mount Logan is an 8,413-foot-elevation (2,564-meter) mountain summit located in Garfield County, Colorado, United States. This peak is situated 5 miles (8.0 km) north of the community of De Beque, and 31 miles (50 km) northeast of Grand Junction. Interstate 70 traverses the southeast base of the mountain. Precipitation runoff from this landform drains into the Colorado River, and topographic relief is significant as the summit rises 3,500 feet (1,100 meters) above the river in three miles (4.8 km). The mountain and surrounding area is controlled by the Bureau of Land Management. This landform's toponym has appeared in publications since at least 1913, and has been officially adopted by the U.S. Board on Geographic Names.

== Climate ==
According to the Köppen climate classification system, Mount Logan is located in a semi-arid climate zone. Summers are hot and dry, while winters are cold with some snow. Temperatures reach 100 °F (38 °C) on 5.3 days, 90 °F (32 °C) on 57 days, and remain at or below freezing on 13 days annually.

== Geology ==
Mount Logan is an erosional remnant of the Roan Plateau. The mountain consists of Eocene-age sedimentary rock, primarily sandstone and shale. The mountain is capped by Uinta Formation, and the slopes consist of the Green River Formation. A Holocene-age landslide is conspicuous on the southeast slope. Oil shale was mined on the mountain in the 1920s by the Mount Logan Oil Shale Mining & Refining Company.

== Gallery ==
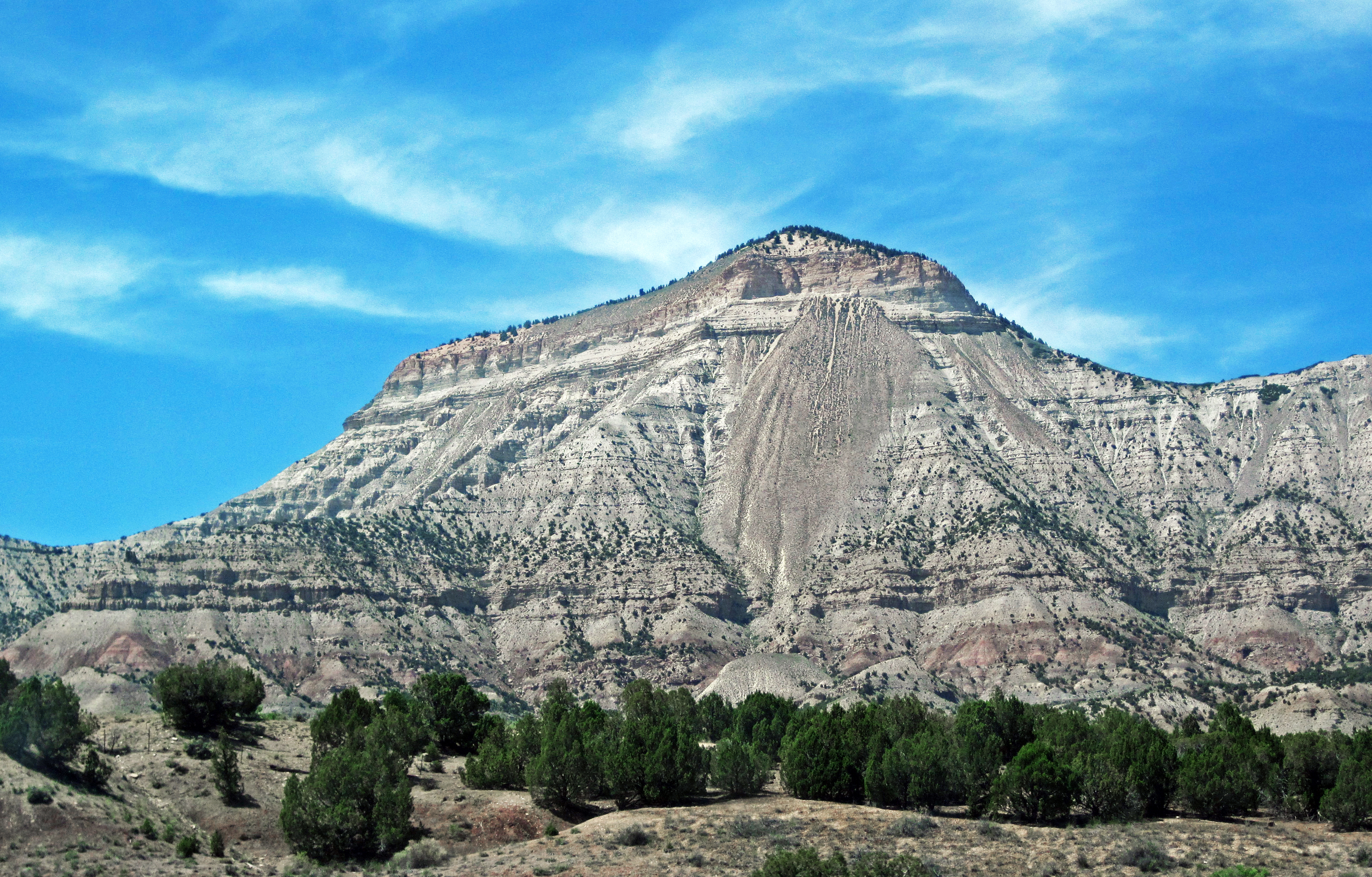
Landslide on the south-southeastern face of Mt. Logan. The mountain is capped by Uinta Formation sedimentary rocks, and the slopes consist of the Green River Formation (both Eocene in age).

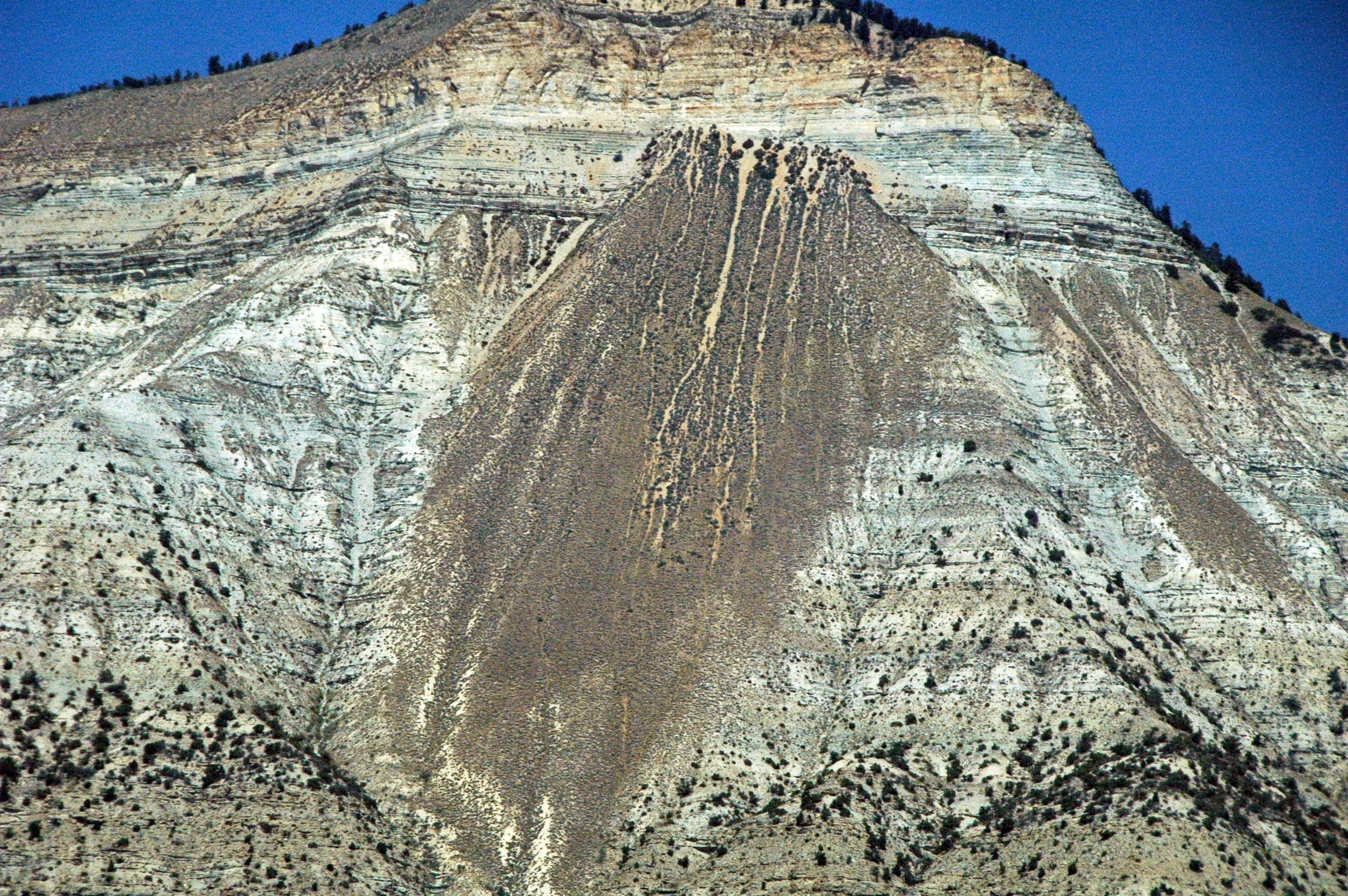
Holocene-age landslide on Mt. Logan

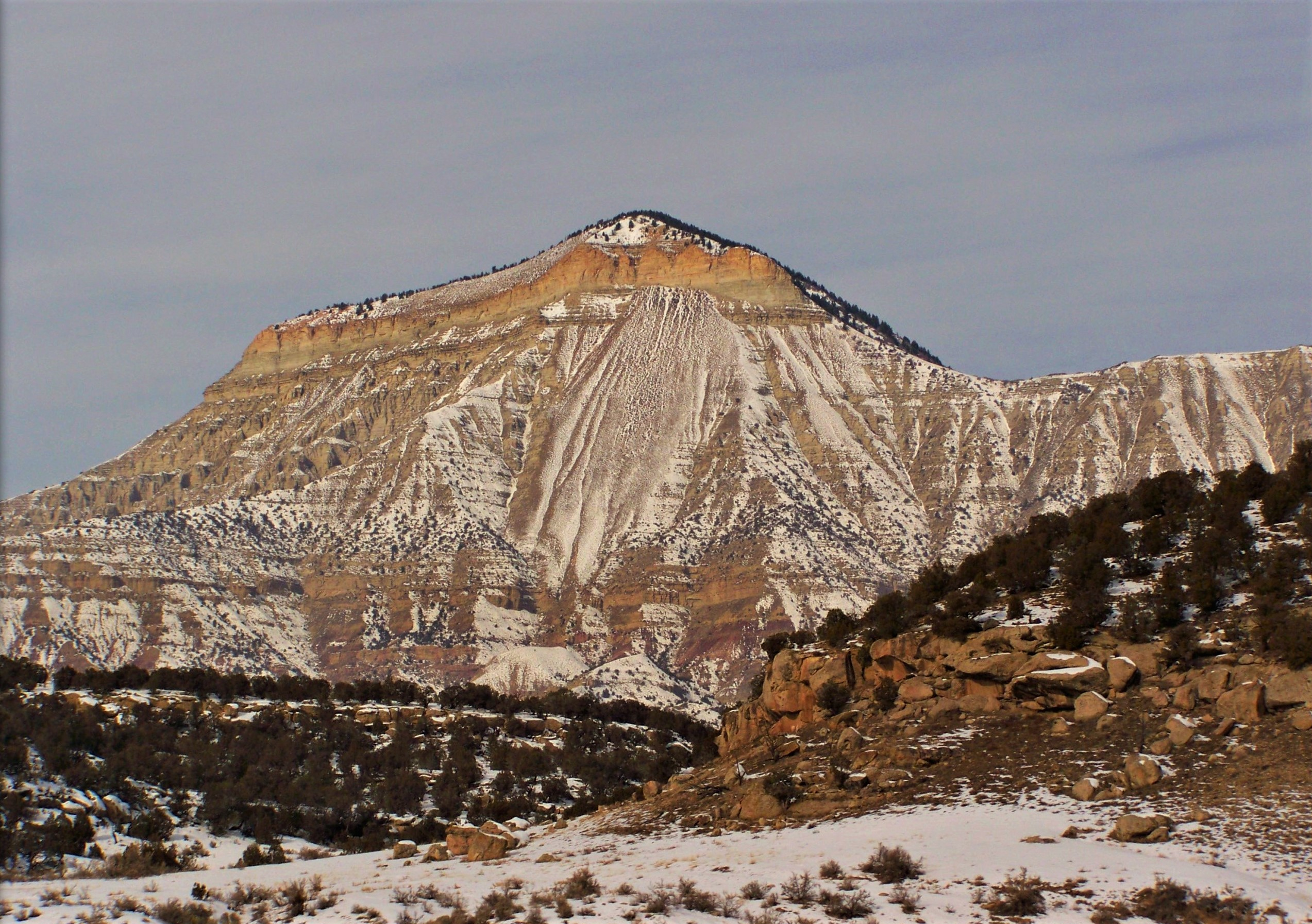
South aspect seen from California Zephyr

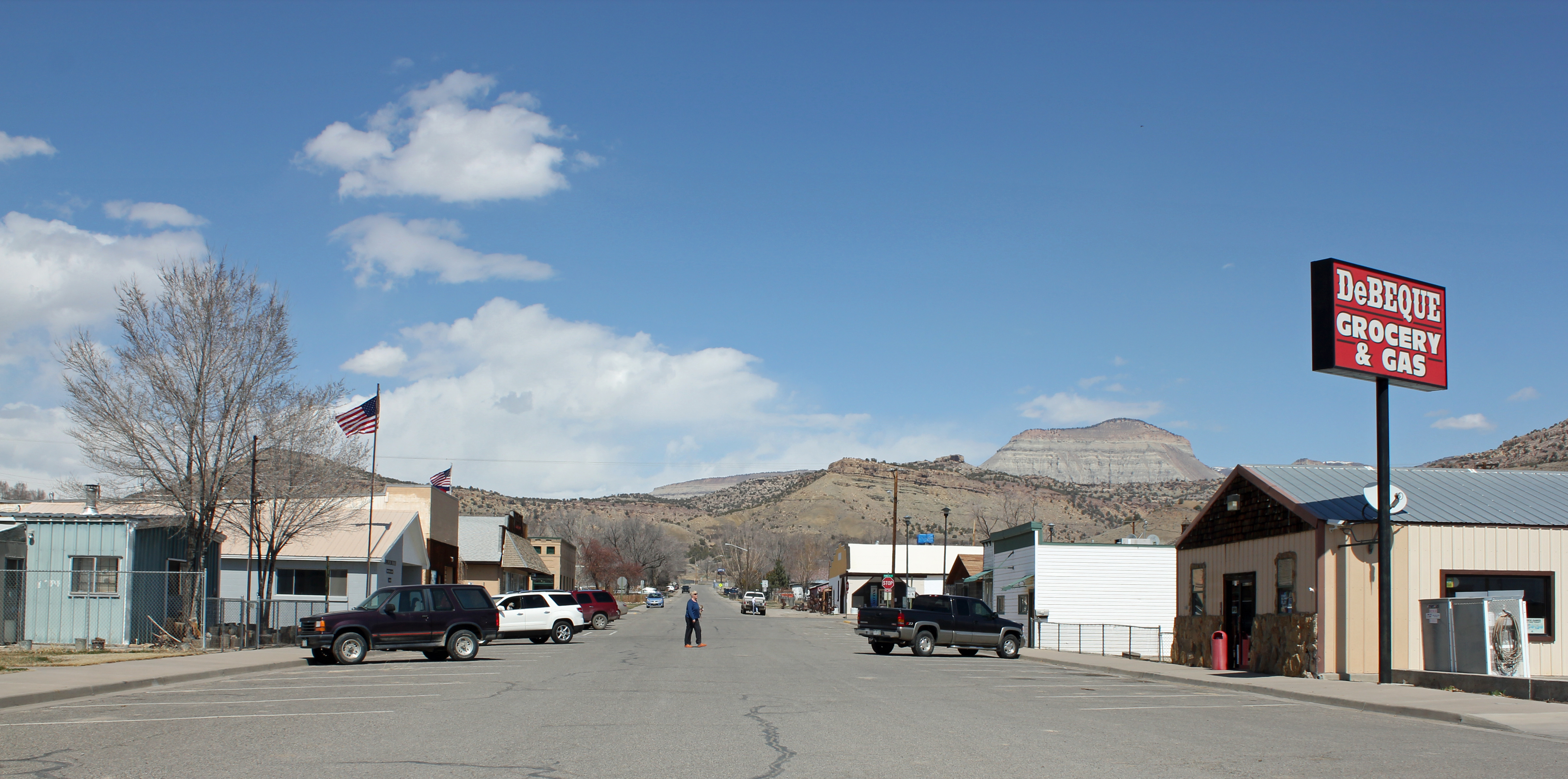
Mount Logan visible from De Beque

== See also ==
- Roan Cliffs
