= Project Rulison =

Late 1960s U.S. nuclear test in Garfield County, Colorado

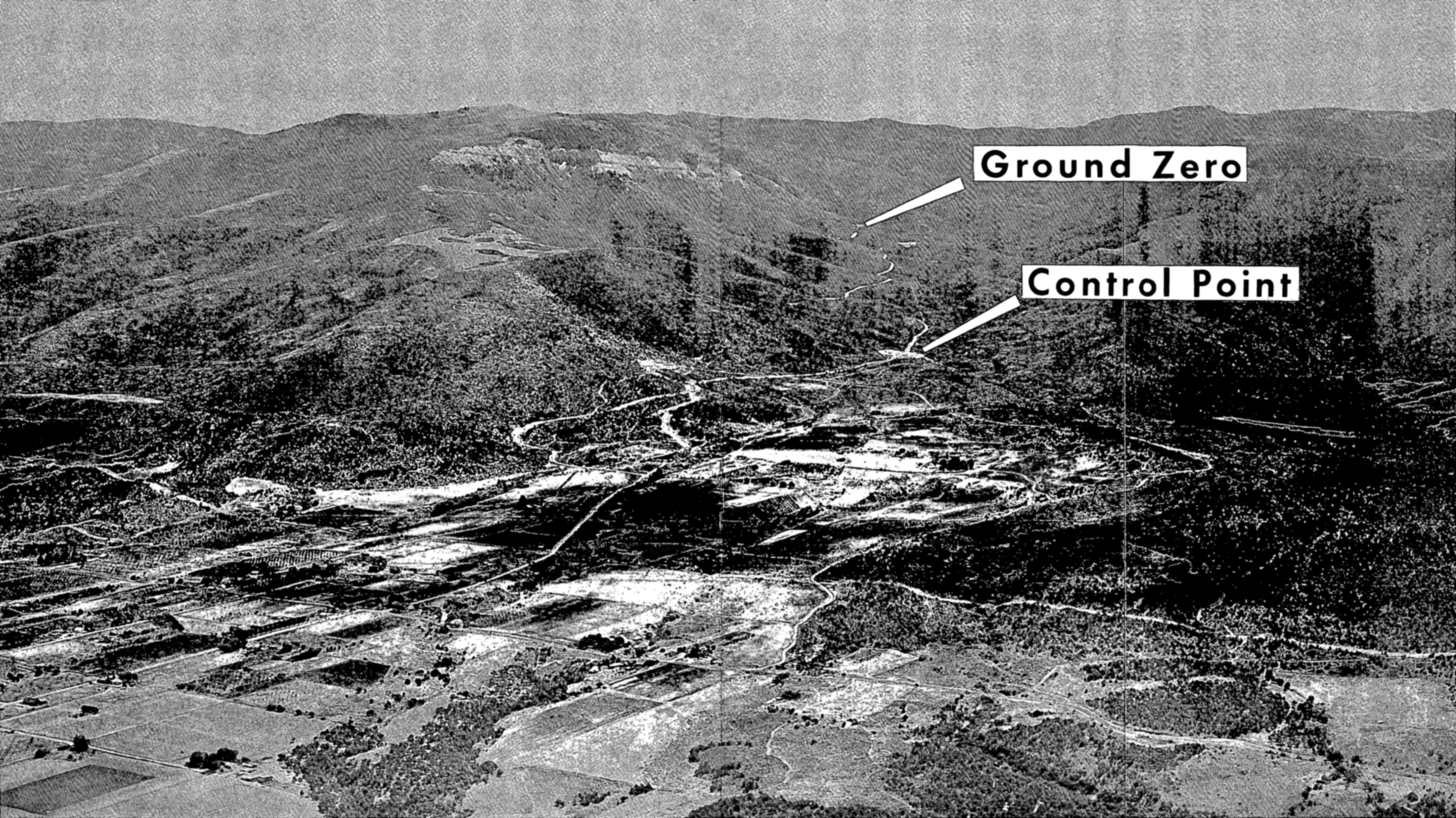
- View of Rulison Site.

Information
- Country: United States
- Test series: Operation Mandrel; Operation Plowshare
- Test site: near Parachute, Colorado
- Date: September 10, 1969
- Test type: Underground
- Yield: 40 kt

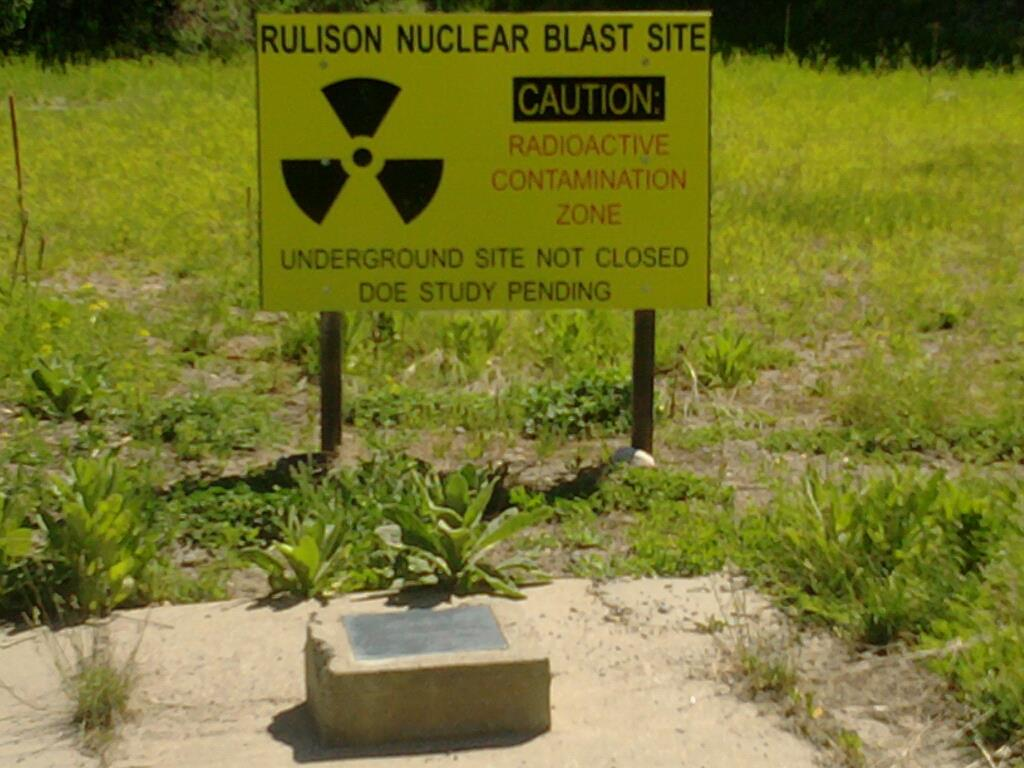
Rulison Test Site in 2012

Project Rulison, named after the rural community of Rulison, Colorado, was an underground 40-kiloton nuclear test that took place on September 10, 1969, about 8 miles (13 km) SE of the town of Grand Valley, Colorado (now named Parachute, Colorado) in Garfield County.

Project Rulison was part of the Operation Mandrel weapons test series under the name Mandrel Rulison. It was the second of three nuclear demonstration projects for natural-gas-reservoir stimulation under Operation Plowshare, an initiative established by the Atomic Energy Commission to research the non-military uses of nuclear energy. The other two projects were Project Gasbuggy in 1967 in northern New Mexico and Project Rio Blanco in 1973 in Colorado.

== Explosion details ==
The location of "Surface Ground Zero," where the explosion took place, was 39°24′19.0″N 107°56′54.7″W. The depth of the test cavity was approximately 8,400 ft (2,600 m) below the ground surface in the Piceance Basin.

The goal of the Project Rulison explosion was to determine if natural gas could be easily liberated from underground regions. The test succeeded in liberating large quantities of natural gas; however, the resulting radioactivity left the gas contaminated and unsuitable for applications such as cooking and heating homes. By the early 1970s, a majority of the US public was opposed to any product containing trace amounts of radioactive material.

== Clean up and later proposals for site ==
The Department of Energy began a cleanup of the site in the 1970s, which was completed in 1998. The state of Colorado enacted a buffer zone around the site, which still exists today. The site also remains under active monitoring by the U.S. Department of Energy Office of Legacy Management.

A January 2005 report by the DOE stated that radioactivity levels were normal at the surface and in groundwater, though a later report due in 2007 was expected to more fully explore if there was subsurface contamination and whether or not radioactivity was still spreading outward from the blast site itself.

As of June 2005, the Houston-based company Presco was seeking to drill for natural gas within the buffer zone, putting in as many as four wells. The company had initially received approval to drill one well, but the county dropped its support when more extensive plans were revealed.

A placard, erected in 1976, marks the site where the blast took place. It is accessible via a gravel road, Garfield County Route 338.
