= Rulison, Colorado =

Unincorporated community in Garfield County, CO, USA

- Unincorporated community
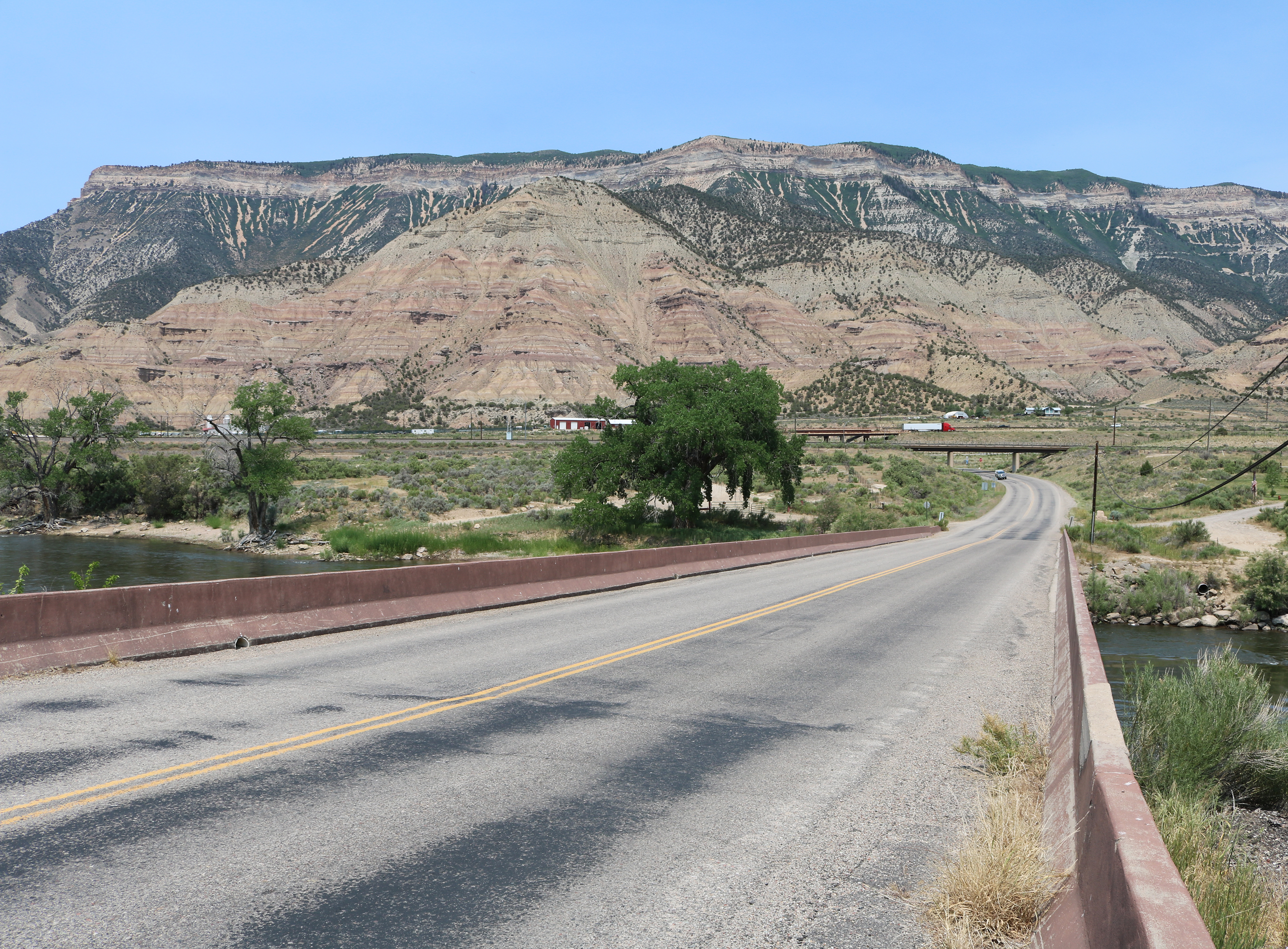
- Looking north from Rulison just south of the Colorado River, June 2021. The Roan Cliffs rise above the community.

- Location of Rulison, Colorado. Rulison (the United States)
- Coordinates: 39°29′50″N 107°56′26″W
- Country: United States
- State: Colorado
- County: Garfield

Government
  - Type: Unincorporated community
  - Body: Garfield County
- Elevation: 5,191 ft (1,582 m)
- Time zone: UTC−07:00 (MST)
  - Summer (DST): UTC−06:00 (MDT)
- ZIP code: 81650 & 81635
- Area code: 970
- GNIS ID: 174738

Rulison is an unincorporated community in Garfield County, Colorado, United States. Rulison is accessible from Interstate 70 and U.S. Route 6.

== History ==
Rulison is most notable for being the namesake of the Project Rulison nuclear test on September 10, 1969. Rulison never had a post office, and is served by both the Rifle (ZIP code 81650) and Parachute (ZIP code 81635) post offices.
