= Rifle Garfield County Airport =

- IATA: RIL; ICAO: KRIL; FAA LID: RIL

Summary
- Airport type: Public
- Owner: Garfield County
- Serves: Rifle and Garfield County, Colorado
- Location: Garfield County, Colorado
- Elevation AMSL: 5,537 ft (1,688 m)
- Coordinates: 39°31′34″N 107°43′33″W
- Website: Official website

Map
- Location within Colorado

Runways
Direction	Length		Surface
Direction	ft	m	Surface
8/26	7,000	2,134	Asphalt
- Source: Federal Aviation Administration

Rifle Garfield County Airport (IATA: RIL, ICAO: KRIL, FAA LID: RIL) is a county-owned public-use airport in unincorporated Garfield County, Colorado, United States. It is located 3 nautical miles (5.6 km) east of the central business district of Rifle, Colorado. According to the FAA's National Plan of Integrated Airport Systems for 2009–2013, it is categorized as a general aviation facility.

== Facilities and aircraft ==
Rifle Garfield County Airport covers an area of 517 acres (209 ha) at an elevation of 5,537 feet (1,688 m) above mean sea level. It has one runway designated 8/26 with an asphalt surface measuring 7,000 by 100 feet (2,134 x 30 m).

For the 12-month period ending December 31, 2018, the airport had 14,382 aircraft operations, an average of 39 per day: 84% general aviation, 16% air taxi, and <1% military. At that time there were 22 aircraft based at this airport: 16 single-engine, 3 multi-engine, 2 jet, and 1 glider.

== See also ==
- List of airports in Colorado
