= Garfield School District Re-2 =

School district in Garfield County, Colorado

Address
- 839 Whiteriver Avenue Rifle, Colorado, 81650; United States

District information
- Type: Public
- Grades: PreK–12
- NCES District ID: 0806240

Students and staff
- Students: 4,613 (2021–2022)
- Teachers: 298.25 (on an FTE basis)
- Staff: 421.97 (on an FTE basis)
- Student–teacher ratio: 15.47

Other information
- Website: www.garfieldre2.net

Garfield School District Re-2 is a school district headquartered in Rifle, Colorado. It includes municipalities and areas in Garfield County.

In addition to Rifle, the district includes New Castle and Silt.

As of 2020 it had almost 800 employees and 4,700 students.

== Schools ==
The district has ten schools, including six elementary schools, two middle schools, and two high schools.

School name	Grades	Enrollment (2021–2022)	City	Website
Cactus Valley Elementary School	P–5	432	Silt	
Coal Ridge High School	9–12	498	New Castle	
Elk Creek Elementary School	P–5	250	New Castle	
Graham Mesa Elementary School	P–5	419	Rifle	
Highland Elementary School	P–5	463	Rifle	
Kathryn Senor Elementary School	P–5	288	New Castle	
Rifle High School	9–12	778	Rifle	
Rifle Middle School	6–8	633	Rifle	
Riverside Middle School	6–8	474	New Castle	
Wamsley Elementary School	P–5	378	Rifle	

Famous Attendees

- Lauren Boebert
