= Coal Ridge High School =

High school in New Castle, Colorado

Location
- 35947 Highway 6 New Castle, Colorado 81647; United States; 39°33′1″N 107°36′33″W

Information
- School type: Public high school
- Established: 2005
- School district: Garfield RE-2
- CEEB code: 061069
- NCES School ID: 080624001906
- Principal: Jackie Davis
- Teaching staff: 27.63 (on an FTE basis)
- Grades: 9–12
- Enrollment: 629 (2023–2024)
- Student to teacher ratio: 22.77
- Colors: Blue and black
- Athletics conference: CHSAA
- Mascot: Titans
- Website: coalridge.garfieldre2.net

Coal Ridge High School is a public secondary school in New Castle, Colorado, United States. It serves New Castle, Silt, and Rifle. It is within Garfield School District Re-2.

The school was founded in 2005. Its cheer team has won five state championships (2016, 2018, 2019, 2020, 2021 coed) They have placed 2nd three times. (2015, 2017, 2018 all girl)
