= Grand Hogback =

Ridge in Colorado, United States

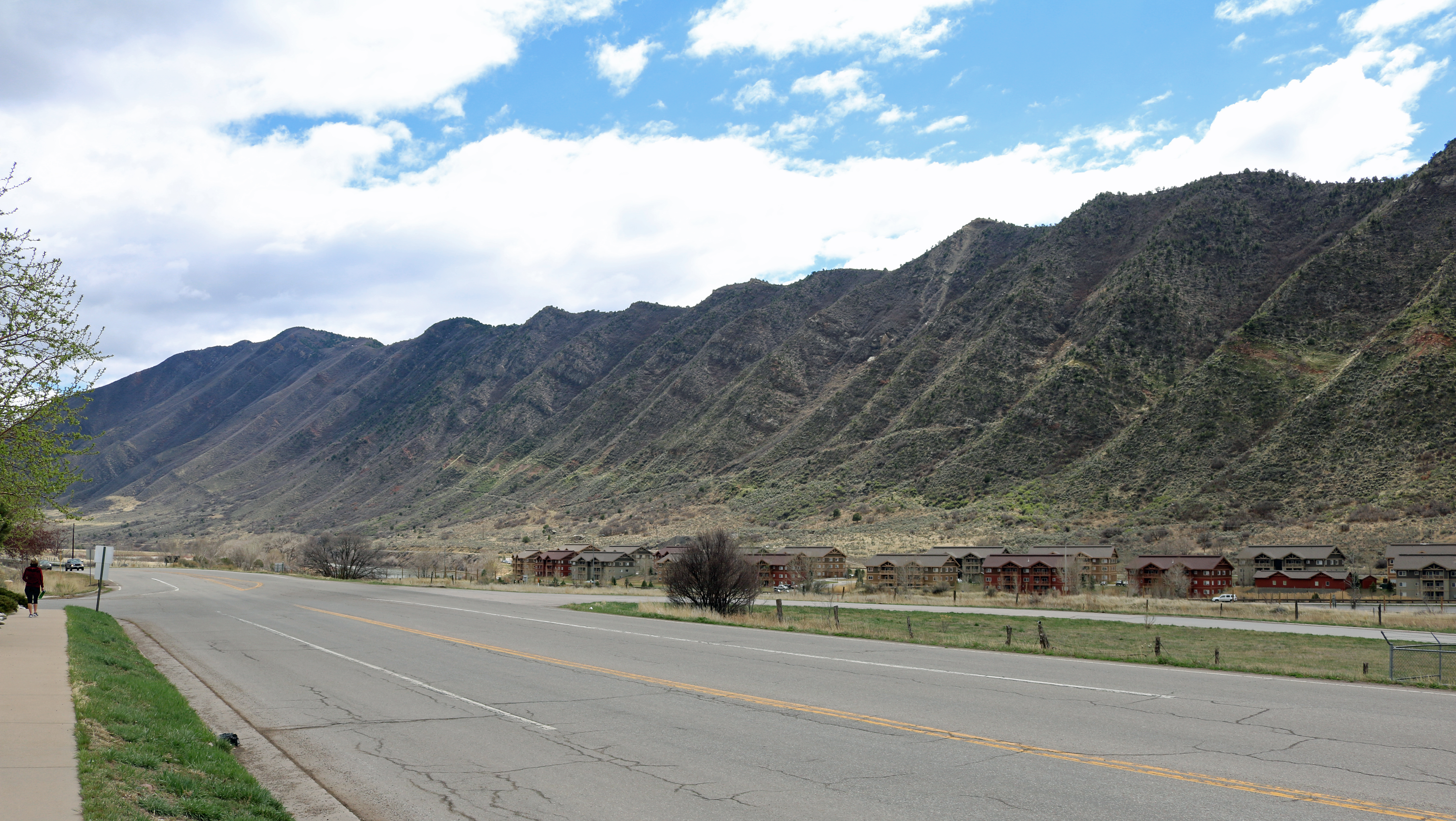
- Part of the Grand Hogback near New Castle, Colorado.

Highest point
- Elevation: 9,187 ft (2,800 m)
- Coordinates: 39°37′07″N 107°45′17″W

Geography
- Location within Colorado
- Location: Pitkin, Garfield and Rio Blanco counties, Colorado

The Grand Hogback is a 70-mile-long (110 km), curving, spine-like ridge in Western Colorado that extends from near McClure Pass in Pitkin County through Garfield County and then to near Meeker in Rio Blanco County. The hogback is significant because it marks part of the boundary between the Colorado Plateau to the west and the Southern Rocky Mountains to the east.

The elevation of the ridge ranges from 7,710 to 9,194 feet (2,350 to 2,802 m). The hogback appears as a series of serrated ridges and is easily discernable from Google Maps and other aerial views. It is visible from Interstate 70.

== Gaps ==
Rivers have carved out several gaps in the hogback, the most notable being the one the Colorado River has carved out near New Castle, Colorado. Others include Harvey Gap and Rifle Gap, both of which have been dammed to create reservoirs and state parks.

== Geology ==
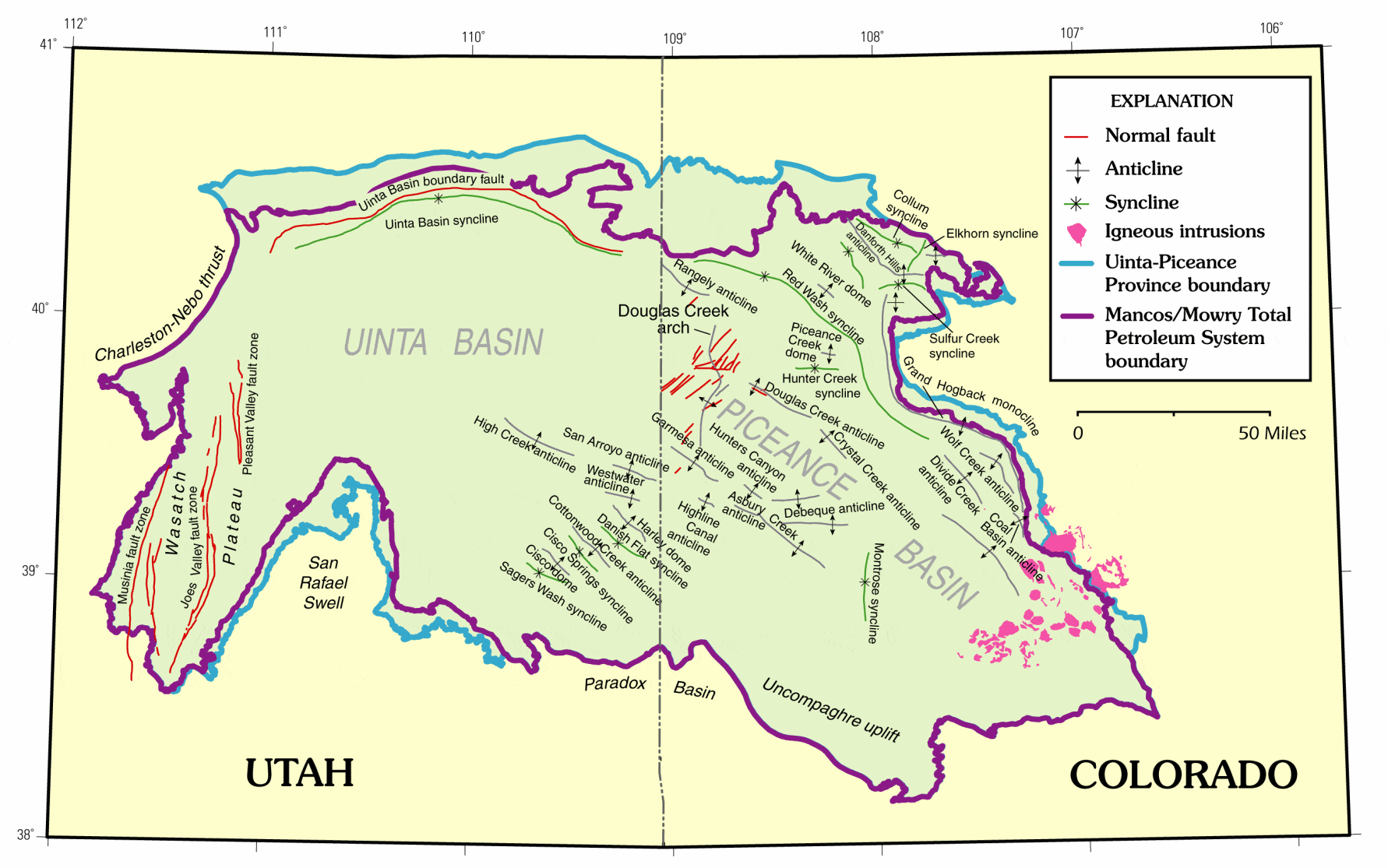
The Grand Hogback Monocline defines the eastern limit of the Uinta-Piceance Basin

A monocline, the Grand Hogback is part of the Mesaverde Formation. The ridge formed towards the end of the Laramide orogeny during the middle to late Eocene.
