= Antlers, Colorado =

Unincorporated community in Garfield County, Colorado, United States

- Unincorporated community
- Location of Antlers, Colorado. Antlers (Colorado)
- Coordinates: 39°32′36″N 107°43′40″W
- Country: United States
- State: Colorado
- County: Garfield

Government
  - Type: Unincorporated community
  - Body: Garfield County
- Elevation: 5,387 ft (1,642 m)
- Time zone: UTC−07:00 (MST)
  - Summer (DST): UTC−06:00 (MDT)
- ZIP code: 81650
- Area code: 970
- GNIS pop ID: 174052

Antlers is an unincorporated community in Garfield County, Colorado, United States. Antlers is accessible from U.S. Route 6 and is located within Cactus Valley.

== History ==
Antlers was established in 1887 by the Grass Valley Land and Water Company and a group of English investors. It was platted near the Ives railroad station. The corporation and the investors divided their land into lots and were sold or leased to farmers. In 1910, Antlers had a school, general store, a town park, and other town amenities. The school closed in 1963 and is now privately owned. The Antlers, Colorado, post office operated from July 1, 1891, until April 30, 1954. Rifle, Colorado, post office (ZIP code 81650) now serves Antlers. The community derives its name from the Antlers Hotel in Colorado Springs.

== See also ==
- Rifle, CO Micropolitan Statistical Area
