= Valley View Hospital =

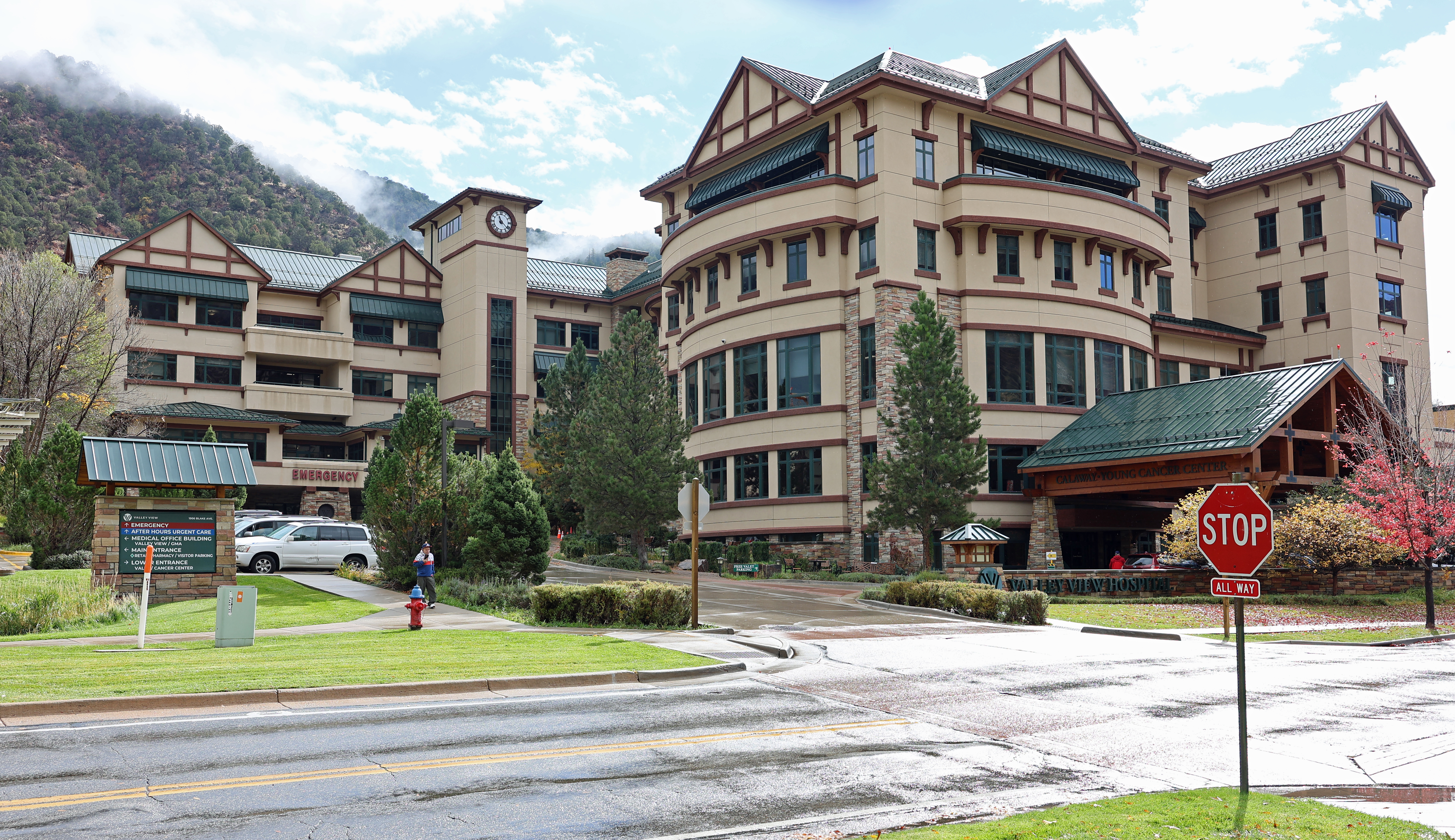
- The hospital's main entrance area

- The hospital's location in Colorado.

Geography
- Location: 1606 Blake Ave. Glenwood Springs, Garfield County, Colorado, US
- Coordinates: 39°31′57.42″N 107°19′18.78″W

Organisation
- Care system: Private
- Type: Acute hospital

Services
- Emergency department: III
- Beds: 78

History
- Founded: 1955

Links
- Website: www.vvh.org

Valley View Hospital is an acute hospital in Glenwood Springs, Colorado, in Garfield County. The hospital is a level III trauma center. It has 78 beds.

== History ==
The hospital first opened on August 30, 1955 in a building constructed using monies from the Hill–Burton Act and community fundraising, and land donated by Garfield County. The original building was a 22,000-square-foot (2,000-square-meter) single-story, 35-bed hospital. The Mennonite Board of Missions and Charities was engaged to manage the hospital initially. Today, the hospital operates as an independent, non-profit health system.
