= Silt, Colorado =

Town in Colorado, United States

- Town
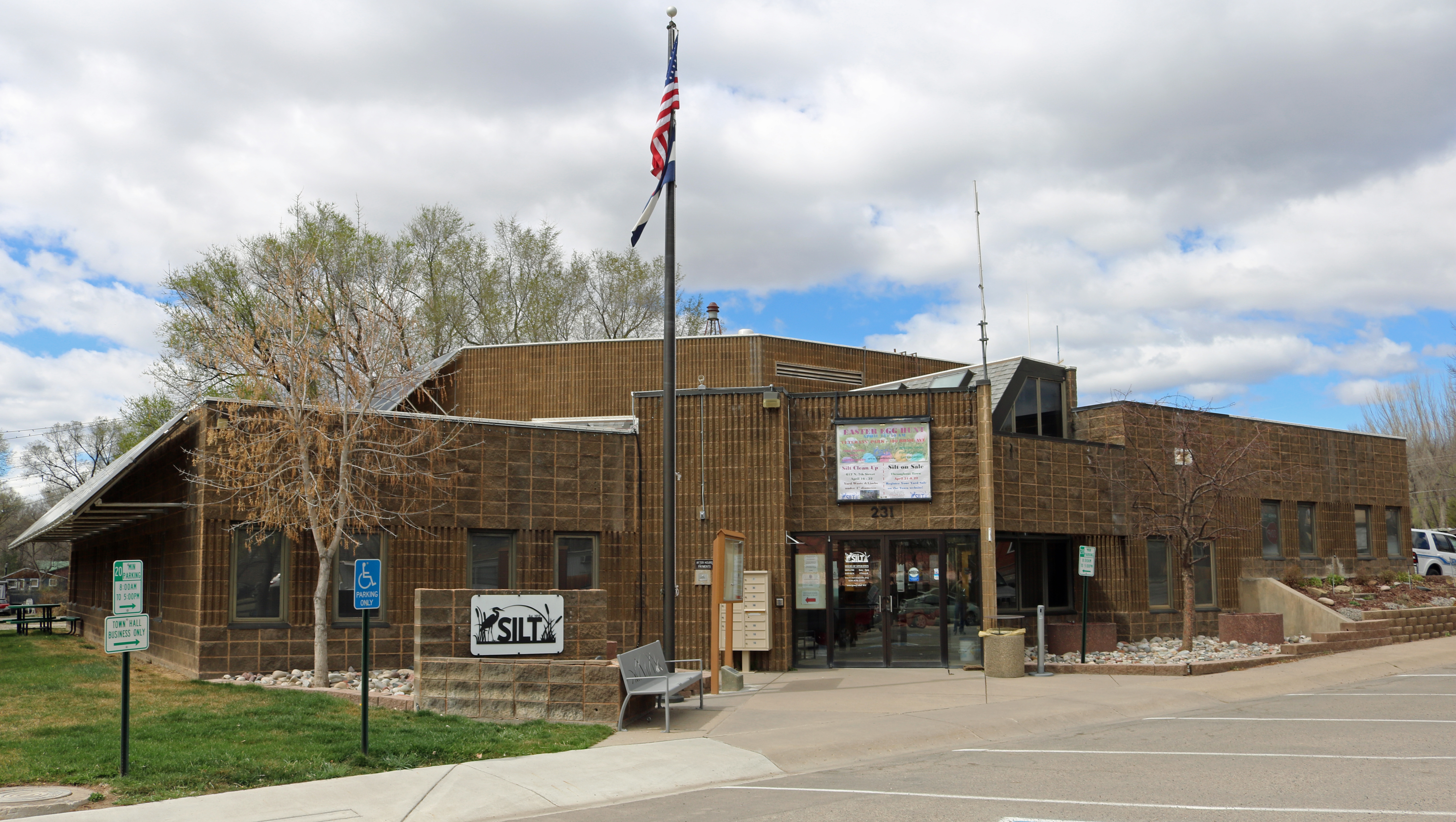
- Silt Town Hall.

- Location of Silt in Garfield County, Colorado.
- Coordinates: 39°32′47″N 107°39′07″W
- Country: United States
- State: Colorado
- County: Garfield County
- Incorporated: May 1915

Government
  - Type: Statutory Town

Area
  - Total: 1.73 sq mi (4.47 km^{2})
  - Land: 1.66 sq mi (4.29 km^{2})
  - Water: 0.069 sq mi (0.18 km^{2})
- Elevation: 5,456 ft (1,663 m)

Population (2020)
  - Total: 3,536
  - Density: 2,130/sq mi (824/km^{2})
- Time zone: UTC-7 (Mountain (MST))
  - Summer (DST): UTC-6 (MDT)
- ZIP code: 81652
- Area code: 970
- FIPS code: 08-70195
- GNIS feature ID: 2413284
- Website: www.townofsilt.org

Silt is a statutory town in Garfield County, Colorado, United States. The population was 3,536 at the 2020 census, up from 2,930 at the 2010 census. The town is part of the Glenwood Springs Micropolitan Area.

== History ==
George Ferguson filed a homestead claim at the site of present-day Silt on April 21, 1886. He established a ferry across the Grand River (now the Colorado River), along with a wagon barn, livery stable, store, and post office to serve travelers between communities on the Western Slope. The settlement, originally known as Ferguson, was renamed Silt in 1889 when the Denver and Rio Grande Railroad established a depot near Ferguson's ranch. The community was named for the silt deposits at the original town site. A post office was established at Silt in 1898.

== Geography ==
Silt is located on the north side of the Colorado River about 175 miles (282 km) west of Denver. Interstate 70 passes through the town as it follows the river, with access from Exit 97. Glenwood Springs, the county seat, is 19 miles (31 km) to the east, and Rifle is 7 miles (11 km) to the west. U.S. Route 6 is Main Street in Silt, and provides a local route parallel to I-70. Silt lies near the eastern edge of a basin known as Cactus Valley.

According to the United States Census Bureau, the town has a total area of 1.5 square miles (3.8 km^{2}), of which 0.023 square miles (0.06 km^{2}), or 1.46%, is water.

=== Climate ===
This climatic region is typified by large seasonal temperature differences, with warm to hot (and often humid) summers and cold (sometimes severely cold) winters. According to the Köppen Climate Classification system, Silt has a humid continental climate, abbreviated "Dfb" on climate maps.

Climate data for Silt, Colorado
Month	Jan	Feb	Mar	Apr	May	Jun	Jul	Aug	Sep	Oct	Nov	Dec	Year
Mean daily maximum °C (°F)	3 (37)	7 (44)	12 (54)	18 (64)	23 (74)	29 (84)	32 (90)	31 (88)	26 (79)	19 (67)	11 (51)	4 (39)	18 (64)
Mean daily minimum °C (°F)	−13 (9)	−8 (17)	−4 (24)	−1 (31)	4 (39)	7 (45)	11 (52)	10 (50)	5 (41)	−1 (31)	−6 (21)	−11 (12)	−1 (31)
Average precipitation mm (inches)	23 (0.9)	20 (0.8)	23 (0.9)	25 (1)	25 (1)	18 (0.7)	25 (1)	28 (1.1)	28 (1.1)	30 (1.2)	23 (0.9)	23 (0.9)	290 (11.6)
Source: Weatherbase

== Demographics ==
Historical population
Census	Pop.	Note	%±
1920	165		—
1930	264		60.0%
1940	359		36.0%
1950	361		0.6%
1960	384		6.4%
1970	434		13.0%
1980	923		112.7%
1990	1,095		18.6%
2000	1,740		58.9%
2010	2,930		68.4%
2020	3,536		20.7%
U.S. Decennial Census

As of the census of 2000, there were 1,740 people, 648 households, and 452 families residing in the town. The population density was 616.6 inhabitants per square mile (238.1/km^{2}). There were 668 housing units at an average density of 236.7 units per square mile (91.4 units/km^{2}). The racial makeup of the town was 89.60% White, 0.17% African American, 1.32% Native American, 7.41% from other races, and 1.49% from two or more races. Hispanic or Latino of any race were 14.20% of the population.

There were 648 households, out of which 41.0% had children under the age of 18 living with them, 58.3% were married couples living together, 7.1% had a female householder with no husband present, and 30.2% were non-families. 23.9% of all households were made up of individuals, and 5.9% had someone living alone who was 65 years of age or older. The average household size was 2.69 and the average family size was 3.21.

In the town, the population was spread out, with 30.5% under the age of 18, 7.8% from 18 to 24, 37.6% from 25 to 44, 18.2% from 45 to 64, and 5.9% who were 65 years of age or older. The median age was 31 years. For every 100 females, there were 108.9 males. For every 100 females age 18 and over, there were 104.4 males.

The median income for a household in the town was $44,632, and the median income for a family was $51,736. Males had a median income of $37,566 versus $25,417 for females. The per capita income for the town was $17,723. About 5.0% of families and 7.8% of the population were below the poverty line, including 5.1% of those under age 18 and 17.1% of those age 65 or over.

=== 2020 census ===
As of the 2020 census, Silt had a population of 3,536. The median age was 32.8 years. 30.6% of residents were under the age of 18 and 8.1% of residents were 65 years of age or older. For every 100 females there were 106.3 males, and for every 100 females age 18 and over there were 102.5 males age 18 and over.

0.0% of residents lived in urban areas, while 100.0% lived in rural areas.

There were 1,176 households in Silt, of which 47.1% had children under the age of 18 living in them. Of all households, 59.0% were married-couple households, 17.3% were households with a male householder and no spouse or partner present, and 18.5% were households with a female householder and no spouse or partner present. About 17.4% of all households were made up of individuals and 6.6% had someone living alone who was 65 years of age or older.

There were 1,217 housing units, of which 3.4% were vacant. The homeowner vacancy rate was 1.1% and the rental vacancy rate was 5.5%.

Racial composition as of the 2020 census
Race	Number	Percent
White	2,254	63.7%
Black or African American	12	0.3%
American Indian and Alaska Native	40	1.1%
Asian	11	0.3%
Native Hawaiian and Other Pacific Islander	1	0.0%
Some other race	591	16.7%
Two or more races	627	17.7%
Hispanic or Latino (of any race)	1,374	38.9%

== Education ==
Silt is within Garfield Re-2 School District. The town is home to Cactus Valley Elementary School. Riverside Middle School and Coal Ridge High School, both located in the neighboring town of New Castle, serve the students of Silt.

== Notable person ==
- Lauren Boebert, U.S. representative

== See also ==
- Glenwood Springs, CO Micropolitan Statistical Area
