= Battlement Mesa, Colorado =

Census-designated place in Garfield County, Colorado, United States

- Census-designated place
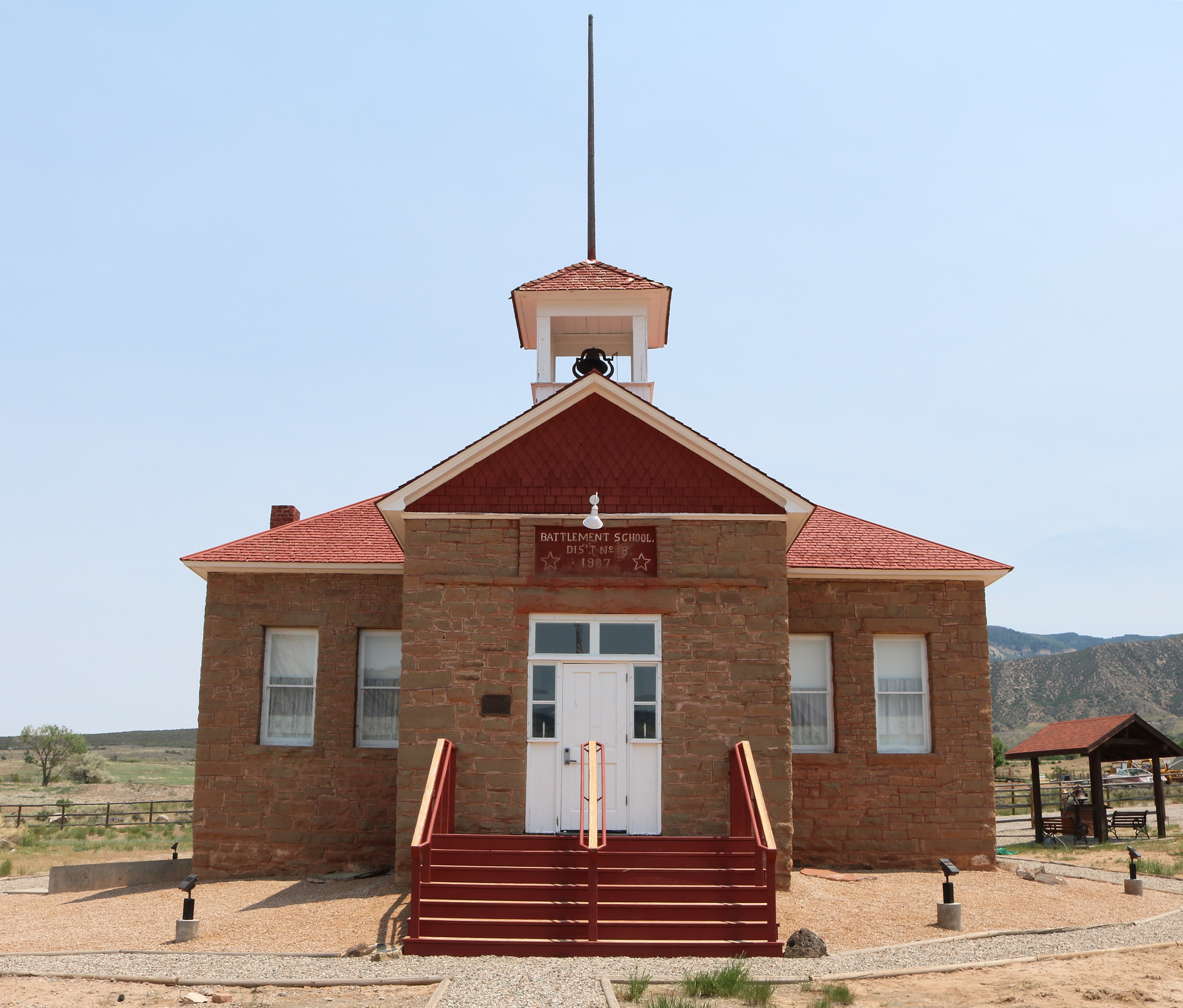
- The Battlement Mesa Schoolhouse in 2021
- Nickname: "The Colorado Dream"
- Location of the Battlement Mesa CDP in Garfield County, Colorado
- Coordinates: 39°27′14″N 107°59′35″W
- Country: United States
- State: Colorado
- County: Garfield

Government
  - Type: unincorporated community
  - Body: Garfield County

Area
  - Total: 11.684 sq mi (30.261 km^{2})
  - Land: 11.459 sq mi (29.678 km^{2})
  - Water: 0.225 sq mi (0.583 km^{2})
- Elevation: 5,489 ft (1,673 m)

Population (2020)
  - Total: 5,438
  - Density: 474.6/sq mi (183.2/km^{2})
- Time zone: UTC−07:00 (MST)
  - Summer (DST): UTC−06:00 (MDT)
- ZIP Code: 81635 and 81636
- Area code: 970
- GNIS town ID: 2407805
- FIPS code: 08-05120

Battlement Mesa is an unincorporated community, a census-designated place (CDP), and post office in and governed by Garfield County, Colorado, United States. The CDP is a part of the Glenwood Springs, CO Micropolitan Statistical Area. The Battlement Mesa post office has the ZIP Codes 81635 and 81636 (for post office boxes). At the United States Census 2020, the population of the Battlement Mesa CDP was 5,438. The Battlement Mesa Metropolitan District provides services.

== Description ==
The community, which bills itself as a "covenant-controlled community", is primarily a group of contiguous subdivisions developed in the later decades of the 20th century, catering to families and retirees. It is located on the flank of a hill on the south side of the Colorado River, across from the older town of Parachute. The two communities together are known as "Parachute-Battlement Mesa". The town takes its name from Battlement Mesa, an 11,000-foot-high (3,400 m) basalt-topped mesa that sits to the south of the town.

== History ==
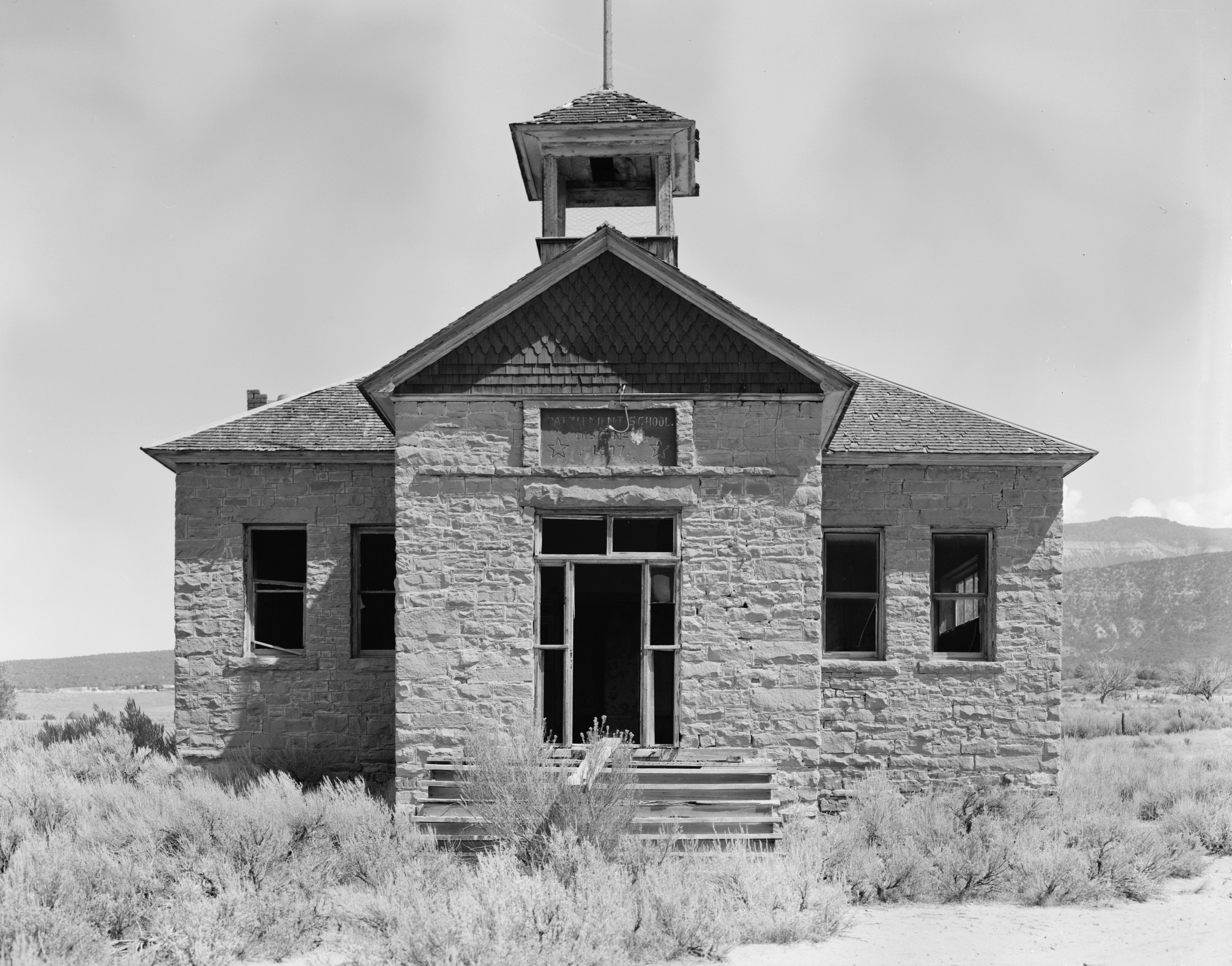
The Battlement Mesa Schoolhouse in 1981, prior to its restoration

The community was first developed by an oil company as a residence for its workers in the expectation that the rising price of oil would make shale oil extraction economically viable. When adjusted oil prices fell, the housing estate was left as a stranded asset, and the oil company marketed it to retirees in conjunction with a real estate firm.

=== Battlement Mesa Schoolhouse ===
The Battlement Mesa Schoolhouse, located at 7201 300 Road, is listed on the National Register of Historic Places. The rear portion of the building was built in 1897 with stone from a local quarry. The front portion was added in 1907, also using stone from the same quarry. By the late 1940s, the building was no longer used as a schoolhouse but was used for community gatherings and events. However, the local population declined, and the schoolhouse fell into disuse and was looted and vandalized. In 2003, the State Historical Fund awarded a grant to The Grand Valley Historical Society to restore the school building.

== Geography ==
Battlement Mesa is located in Garfield County on the south side of the Colorado River. It is bordered to the northwest, across the river, by the town of Parachute. Interstate 70 passes through Parachute, providing access to Battlement Mesa from Exit 75. I-70 leads east 42 miles (68 km) to Glenwood Springs, the Garfield County seat, and southwest 45 miles (72 km) to Grand Junction. Denver is 200 miles (320 km) east via I-70.

At the 2020 United States census, the Battlement Mesa CDP had an area of 7,478 acres (30.261 km^{2}), including 144 acres (0.583 km^{2}) of water.

=== Climate ===
This climatic region is typified by large seasonal temperature differences, with warm to hot summers and cold (sometimes severely cold) winters. According to the Köppen Climate Classification system, Battlement Mesa has a humid continental climate, abbreviated "Dfb" on climate maps.

Climate data for Battlement Mesa, Colorado
Month	Jan	Feb	Mar	Apr	May	Jun	Jul	Aug	Sep	Oct	Nov	Dec	Year
Mean daily maximum °C (°F)	3 (37)	8 (46)	13 (56)	18 (65)	24 (75)	30 (86)	34 (93)	32 (90)	27 (81)	20 (68)	12 (53)	4 (39)	19 (66)
Mean daily minimum °C (°F)	−11 (12)	−8 (18)	−3 (26)	1 (33)	4 (40)	9 (48)	13 (55)	12 (53)	7 (44)	0 (32)	−5 (23)	−11 (13)	1 (33)
Average precipitation mm (inches)	28 (1.1)	25 (1)	33 (1.3)	28 (1.1)	36 (1.4)	20 (0.8)	23 (0.9)	28 (1.1)	36 (1.4)	33 (1.3)	30 (1.2)	28 (1.1)	340 (13.5)
Source: Weatherbase

== Demographics ==
Battlement Mesa CDP, Colorado
Year	Pop.	±%
1990	1,477	—
2000	3,497	+136.8%
2010	4,471	+27.9%
2020	5,438	+21.6%
Source: United States Census Bureau

The United States Census Bureau initially defined the Battlement Mesa CDP for the 1990 United States census.

=== 2020 census ===
As of the 2020 census, Battlement Mesa had a population of 5,438. The median age was 34.5 years. 27.0% of residents were under the age of 18 and 15.2% of residents were 65 years of age or older. For every 100 females there were 98.0 males, and for every 100 females age 18 and over there were 96.7 males age 18 and over.

91.8% of residents lived in urban areas, while 8.2% lived in rural areas.

There were 2,109 households in Battlement Mesa, of which 33.4% had children under the age of 18 living in them. Of all households, 49.4% were married-couple households, 18.4% were households with a male householder and no spouse or partner present, and 23.9% were households with a female householder and no spouse or partner present. About 26.0% of all households were made up of individuals and 10.5% had someone living alone who was 65 years of age or older.

There were 2,229 housing units, of which 5.4% were vacant. The homeowner vacancy rate was 2.4% and the rental vacancy rate was 3.8%.

Racial composition as of the 2020 census
Race	Number	Percent
White	3,970	73.0%
Black or African American	33	0.6%
American Indian and Alaska Native	108	2.0%
Asian	24	0.4%
Native Hawaiian and Other Pacific Islander	9	0.2%
Some other race	630	11.6%
Two or more races	664	12.2%
Hispanic or Latino (of any race)	1,404	25.8%

== Education ==
Battlement Mesa is served by Garfield County School District 16, which also serves the neighboring town of Parachute.

== See also ==
- Rifle, CO Micropolitan Statistical Area
