= De Beque, Colorado =

Town in Colorado, US

De Beque
- Statutory town
- Town of De Beque
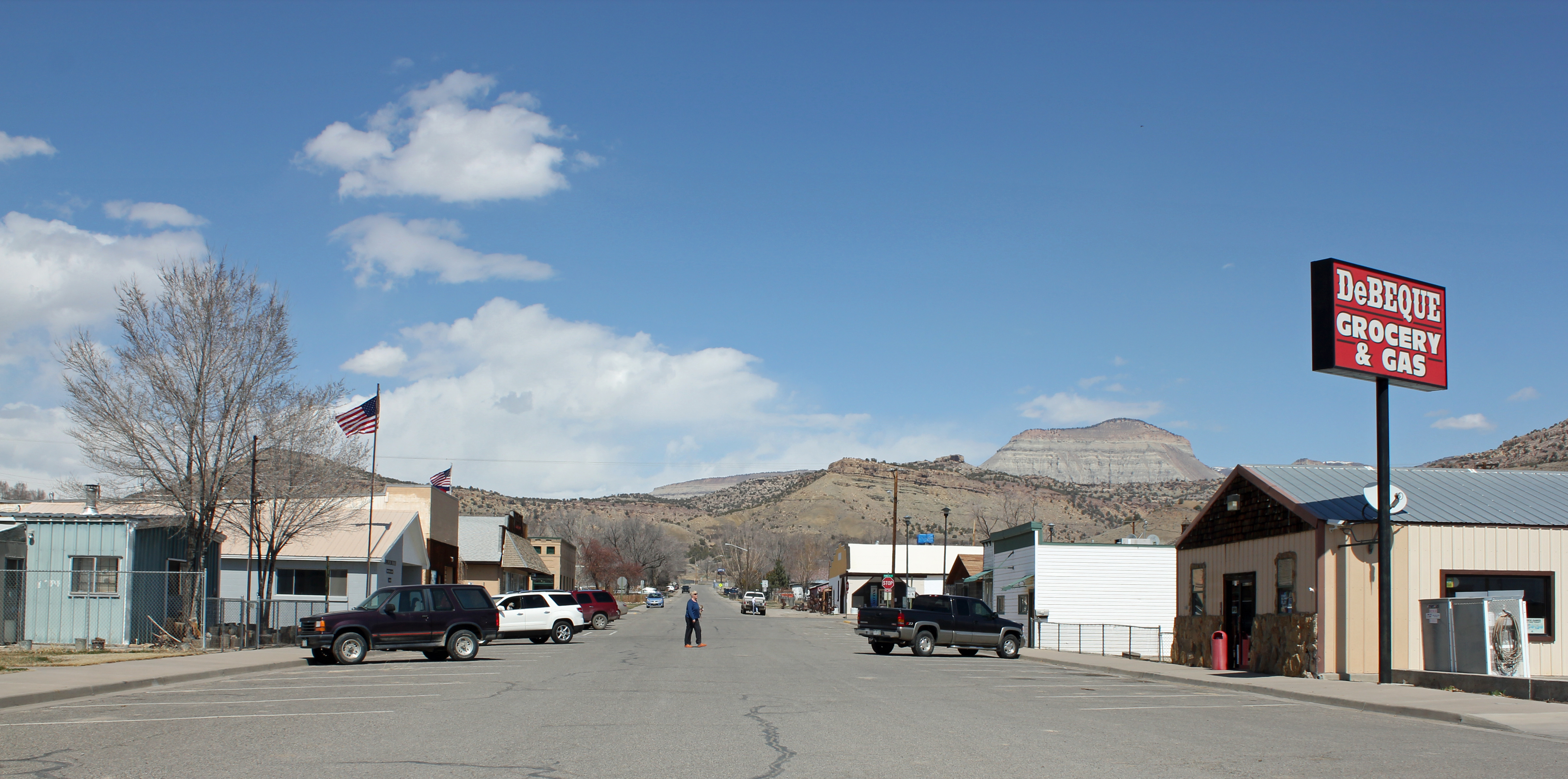
- Minter Avenue in De Beque, March 2013

- Location of the Town of De Beque in Mesa County, Colorado
- Coordinates: 39°18′38″N 108°12′18″W
- Country: United States
- State: Colorado
- County: Mesa
- Settled: 1880
- Incorporated: January 18, 1890

Government
  - Type: Statutory town

Area
  - Total: 2.778 sq mi (7.196 km^{2})
  - Land: 2.727 sq mi (7.063 km^{2})
  - Water: 0.051 sq mi (0.133 km^{2})
- Elevation: 4,954 ft (1,510 m)

Population (2020)
  - Total: 493
  - Density: 183/sq mi (71/km^{2})
- Time zone: UTC−07:00 (MST)
  - Summer (DST): UTC−06:00 (MDT)
- ZIP code: 81630
- Area codes: 970/748
- GNIS town ID: 2412412
- FIPS code: 08-4954
- Website: townofdebeque.colorado.gov

De Beque is a statutory town located in Mesa County, Colorado, United States. The population was 493 at the 2020 census. De Beque is a part of the Grand Junction, CO Metropolitan Statistical Area. The town consists of a small grid, including a historic downtown featuring a town hall, a tavern, and several commercial businesses in historic structures. The surrounding streets include houses, several churches, and a school.

== History ==
The town is located in a region historically occupied by the Ute people. White settlers arrived in the region in 1880. The De Beque, Colorado, post office opened on March 23, 1888, and the Town of De Beque was incorporated on January 18, 1890.

The town is named after Dr. W.A.E. de Beque who explored the area with several companions in 1884 while looking for a suitable location for a ranch.

The town was historically a location where feral horses, prevalent in the surrounding lands, were rounded up and sold. The history of the town is commemorated with a mustang statue near the town hall. In August 2001, the Town Board of Trustees designated De Beque as the only Wild Horse Sanctuary City in the West. The town now undertakes projects in cooperation with the Bureau of Land Management, as well as private organizations, to protect the remaining wild horses in the area. There are no burros in western Colorado. Such measures include the construction of a public corral for the care of injured and sick mustangs awaiting adoption.

On April 1, 2014, De Beque became the first incorporated town in Mesa County to approve the retail sale of recreational marijuana.

== Geography ==
The town sits along the north side of the Colorado River upstream from De Beque Canyon in a small ranching valley approximately 25 miles (40 km) northeast and upstream from Grand Junction. It is located across the river from Interstate 70, on a small hill overlooking the river. The southwest edge of the Roan Cliffs overlook the town from the northeast. Much of the surrounding area in the mountains is controlled by the Bureau of Land Management. Mount Logan can be seen from town, five miles to the north.

At the 2020 United States census, the town had a total area of 1,778 acres (7.196 km^{2}) including 33 acres (0.133 km^{2}) of water.

== Demographics ==
Historical population
Census	Pop.	Note	%±
1900	83		—
1910	149		79.5%
1920	292		96.0%
1930	347		18.8%
1940	280		−19.3%
1950	253		−9.6%
1960	172		−32.0%
1970	155		−9.9%
1980	279		80.0%
1990	257		−7.9%
2000	451		75.5%
2010	504		11.8%
2020	493		−2.2%
U.S. Decennial Census

As of the census of 2000, there were 451 people, 167 households, and 130 families residing in the town. The population density was 1,411.7 inhabitants per square mile (545.1/km^{2}). There were 188 housing units at an average density of 588.5 per square mile (227.2/km^{2}). The racial makeup of the town was 98.45% White, 0.67% Native American, 0.89% from other races. Hispanic or Latino of any race were 2.00% of the population.

There were 167 households, out of which 37.7% had children under the age of 18 living with them, 61.1% were married couples living together, 12.6% had a female householder with no husband present, and 21.6% were non-families. 18.0% of all households were made up of individuals, and 7.8% had someone living alone who was 65 years of age or older. The average household size was 2.70 and the average family size was 3.05.

In the town, the population was spread out, with 30.6% under the age of 18, 8.2% from 18 to 24, 25.9% from 25 to 44, 21.3% from 45 to 64, and 14.0% who were 65 years of age or older. The median age was 34 years. For every 100 females, there were 99.6 males. For every 100 females age 18 and over, there were 94.4 males.

The median income for a household in the town was $29,632, and the median income for a family was $31,042. Males had a median income of $28,750 versus $17,500 for females. The per capita income for the town was $14,181. About 6.2% of families and 7.3% of the population were below the poverty line, including 9.8% of those under age 18 and 3.8% of those age 65 or over.

== Art and Culture ==
=== Wild Horse Days ===
The town has hosted "Wild Horse Day" every August since 2000. The festival includes a rodeo and parade.

The festival was originally begun to promote awareness to the wild horse population and raise funds for a corral and rodeo grounds.

== See also ==
- Grand Junction, CO Metropolitan Statistical Area
