= Roan Cliffs =

Series cliffs and desert mountains in the American states of Utah and Colorado

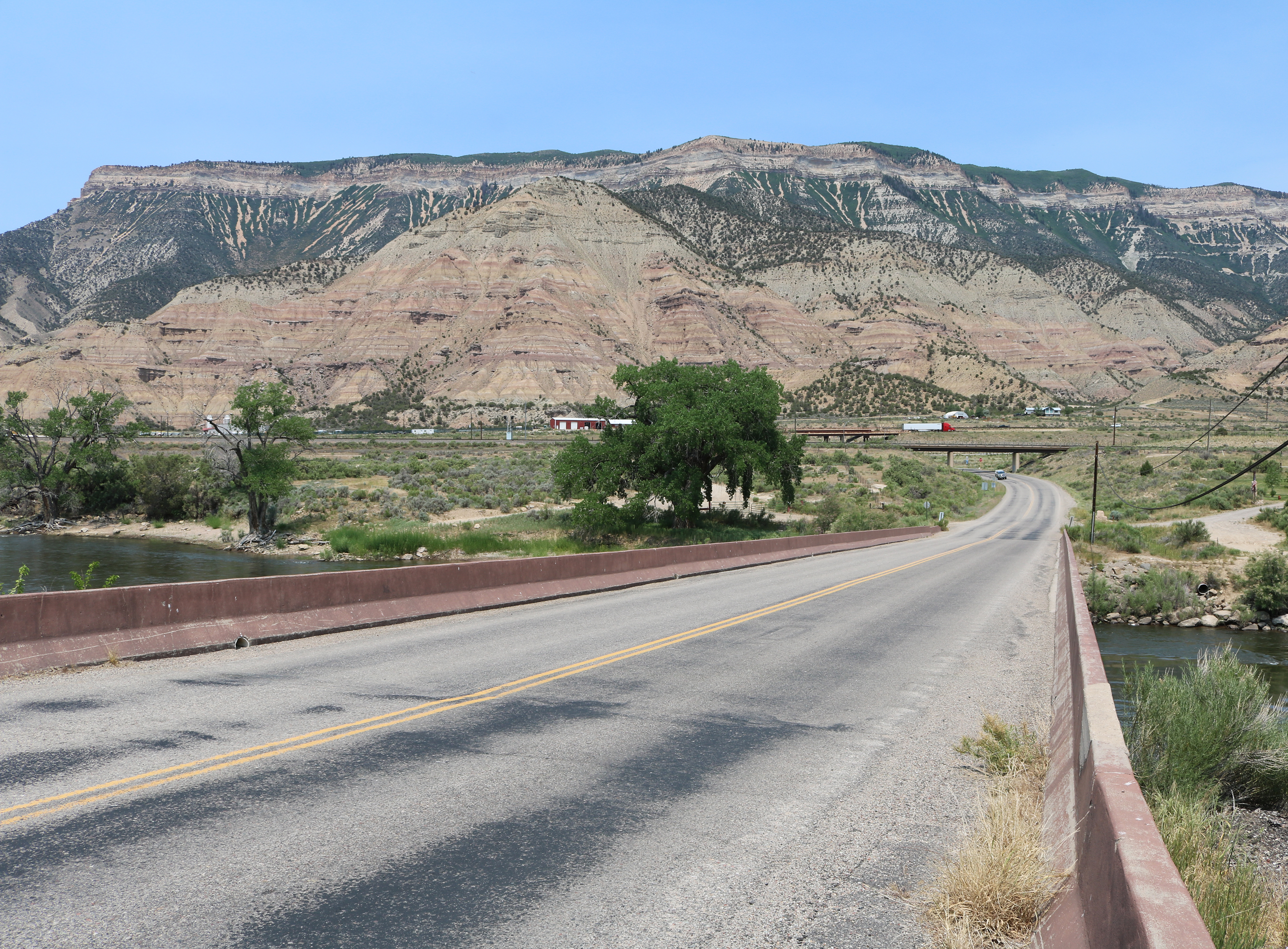
The cliffs above Rulison, Colorado

The Roan Cliffs are a series of desert mountains and cliffs in eastern Utah and western Colorado, in the western United States that are distinct from (but closely associated with) the Book Cliffs.

== Description ==
While Roan Cliffs are "remote and inaccessible", the Book Cliffs run along the edge of the Castle, Gunnison, and Grand valleys and are therefore readily visible from populated areas (i.e., Price and Green River in Utah and Grand Junction in Colorado) and well traveled transportation corridors (i.e., I-70, US-6, US-50, and US-191). As such the Book Cliffs are much better known than the Roan Cliffs. In addition, the name Book Cliffs is often applied to both landforms, with Roan Cliffs being an alternate name. Moreover, because of how far they are spread between Utah and Colorado, they are sometimes mistakenly believed to be separate landforms of the same name within each state.

The Roan Cliffs are situated north of (in back of) and above, but run roughly parallel to, the Book Cliffs. Stretching nearly 190 miles (310 km) from west to east, the Roan Cliffs begin on southern edge of the West Tavaputs Plateau, on the eastern edge of the Willow Creek (and the US-191 corridor), north of Emma Park, and northwest of Helper on the Carbon‑Duchesne county line. (The Book Cliffs do not reach into Duchesne County, but do extend a bit further west to the Price River.) The Roan Cliffs then run southeast along the southern edge of the West Tavaputs Plateau (but north of Whitmore Park), passing through the northeast corner of Emery County until it reaches the Green River in the Desolation and Gray canyons. (The Green River divides the West Tavaputs Plateau from the East Tavaputs Plateau and runs along the Emery‑Grand county line.)

Upon entering Grand County, the Roan Cliffs initially pass through the southern edge of the Uintah and Ouray Indian Reservation. The cliffs continue their southeast course along the southern edge of the East Tavaputs Plateau until they reach a point near the head of Thompson Canyon (about 12.5 miles [20.1 km] north of the community of Thompson Springs). From that point the cliffs head northeast, but still along the southern edge of the East Tavaputs Plateau. They continue northeast until, after passing partially and briefly back into Uintah County, they reach the Utah‑Colorado state line.

East of the state line, the Roan Cliffs continue a northeastern course in Garfield County until they reach the East Salt Creek (and the SH-139 [Douglas Road] corridor). Beyond that creek, the Roan Cliffs run southeast along the southern edge of the East Tavaputs Plateau until they reach the Colorado River (and the I-70/US-6 corridor) at a point about 2 miles (3.2 km) north of the Town of De Beque. (The course of the Book Cliffs runs southeast to their eastern end at the Colorado River in the De Beque Canyon, near the town of Palisade and just northeast of the city of Grand Junction. This is also the eastern end of the Grand Valley.)

The Roan Cliffs then run briefly northeast again (along the Colorado River) to a point about 6.5 miles (10.5 km) west‑northwest of the City of Rifle. This is also near the highpoint for the Roan Cliffs, the Gardner Benchmark, with an elevation of NAVD 88 9,286 feet (2,830 m) and coordinates 39°34′02″N 107°54′36″W. The course of cliffs then turns northwest to run along the southwest side of Government Creek (and the SH-13 [Government Road] corridor) until they reach their eastern end, just south of the Garfield‑Rio Blanco county line, about 62.8 miles (101.1 km) south‑southeast of the "mid-corner" of Rio Blanco County and about 11.2 miles (18.0 km) northwest of the City of Rifle.

== History ==
The Roan Cliffs were originally called the Brown Cliffs by John Wesley Powell (the second Director of the United States Geological Survey), but the name was officially changed in 1932 to Roan Cliffs, to better match the roan color of the cliffs.

== See also ==
- List of mountains in Colorado
- List of mountains in Utah
