= New Castle, Colorado =

Town in Garfield County, Colorado, United States

- Home rule town
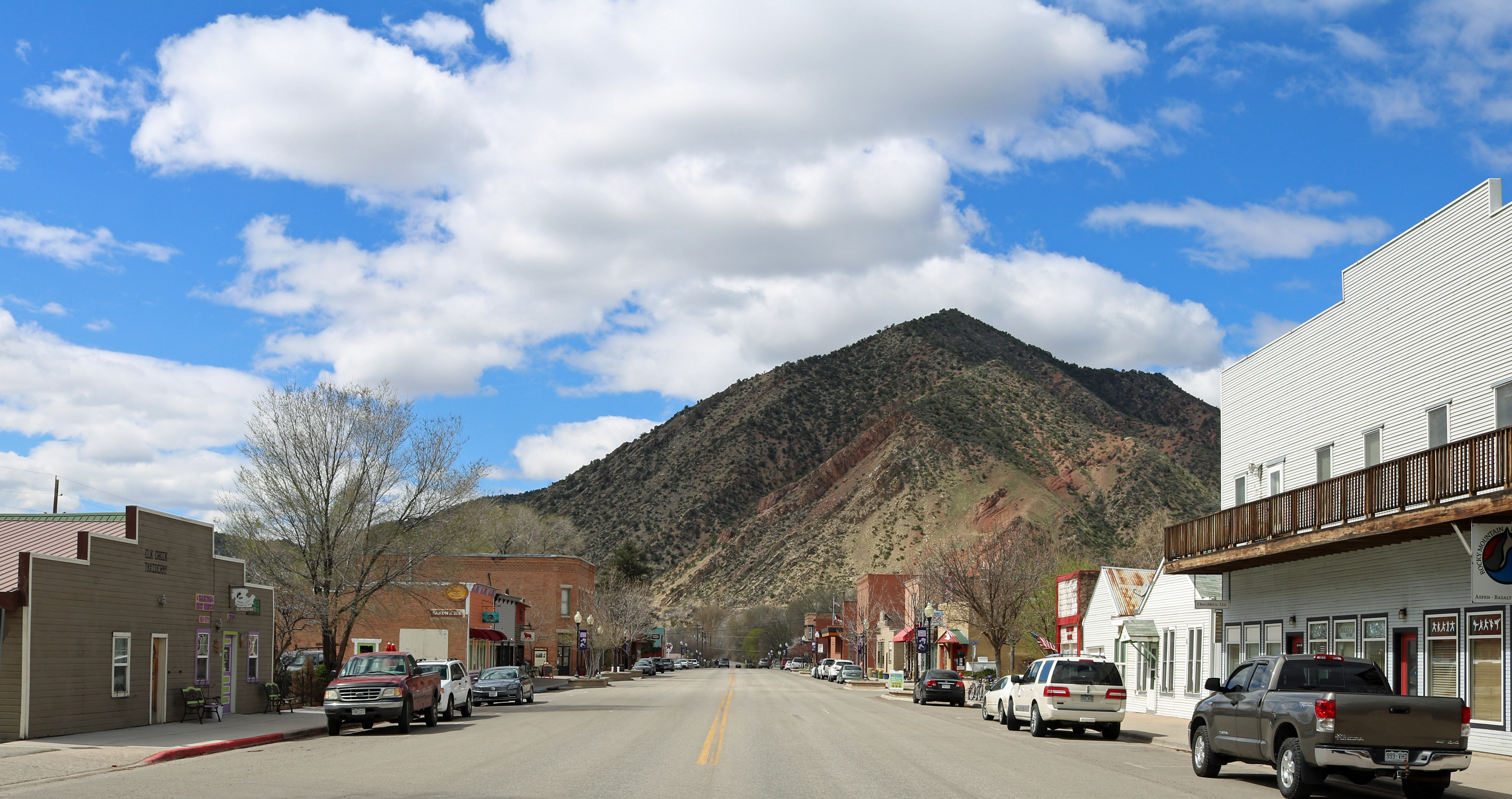
- Main Street, looking towards the Grand Hogback
- Motto: "Authentically Colorado"
- Location of New Castle in Garfield County, Colorado.
- Coordinates: 39°34′39″N 107°31′36″W
- Country: United States
- State: Colorado
- County: Garfield County
- Incorporated (town): March 27, 1890

Government
  - Type: Home rule municipality

Area
  - Total: 2.61 sq mi (6.75 km^{2})
  - Land: 2.52 sq mi (6.52 km^{2})
  - Water: 0.089 sq mi (0.23 km^{2})
- Elevation: 5,811 ft (1,771 m)

Population (2020)
  - Total: 4,923
  - Density: 1,960/sq mi (755/km^{2})
- Time zone: UTC-7 (Mountain (MST))
  - Summer (DST): UTC-6 (MDT)
- ZIP code: 81647
- Area code: 970
- FIPS code: 08-53395
- GNIS feature ID: 2413042
- Website: www.newcastlecolorado.org

The Town of New Castle is a home rule municipality in Garfield County, Colorado, United States. The population was 4,923 at the 2020 census.

== History ==
When New Castle was incorporated in 1888, its economy was largely based on mining coal that was needed by the silver-mining industry to fire silver smelters. On February 18, 1896, a methane explosion in the Vulcan Mine killed 49 men and started a coal fire that was still burning as of 2020. The Vulcan reopened and suffered additional explosions on December 12, 1913 (killing 37) and November 4, 1918 (killing 3).

There are at least 25 coal fires burning near the town. They are normally confined underground.

From 2000 - 2014 the population grew 129%, much higher than the average growth in Colorado over the same period (20.8%).

== Geography ==
New Castle is located on the north side of the Colorado River, just east of where the river cuts through the Grand Hogback. Interstate 70 passes by the town following the river, with access from Exit 105. I-70 leads east 12 miles (19 km) to Glenwood Springs, the county seat, east 169 miles (272 km) to Denver, and west 74 miles (119 km) to Grand Junction. U.S. Route 6 is Main Street in New Castle and forms a parallel route to I-70 for local traffic. US-6 joins I-70 5 miles (8 km) to the east at Chacra and 17 miles (27 km) to the west at a point west of Rifle. Elk Creek flows along the west side of New Castle and has its confluence with the Colorado River just south of Interstate 70.

According to the United States Census Bureau, the town has a total area of 2.7 square miles (7.0 km^{2}), of which 2.7 square miles (6.9 km^{2}) is land and 0.04 square miles (0.1 km^{2}), or 1.21%, is water.

== Demographics ==
Historical population
Census	Pop.	Note	%±
1890	311		—
1900	431		38.6%
1910	493		14.4%
1920	447		−9.3%
1930	470		5.1%
1940	484		3.0%
1950	483		−0.2%
1960	447		−7.5%
1970	499		11.6%
1980	563		12.8%
1990	679		20.6%
2000	1,984		192.2%
2010	4,518		127.7%
2020	4,923		9.0%
U.S. Decennial Census

=== 2020 census ===
As of the 2020 census, New Castle had a population of 4,923. The median age was 36.3 years. 26.7% of residents were under the age of 18 and 12.1% of residents were 65 years of age or older. For every 100 females there were 101.2 males, and for every 100 females age 18 and over there were 97.1 males age 18 and over.

98.0% of residents lived in urban areas, while 2.0% lived in rural areas.

There were 1,816 households in New Castle, of which 37.6% had children under the age of 18 living in them. Of all households, 54.1% were married-couple households, 17.0% were households with a male householder and no spouse or partner present, and 21.4% were households with a female householder and no spouse or partner present. About 22.6% of all households were made up of individuals and 8.6% had someone living alone who was 65 years of age or older.

There were 1,893 housing units, of which 4.1% were vacant. The homeowner vacancy rate was 1.4% and the rental vacancy rate was 4.5%.

Racial composition as of the 2020 census
Race	Number	Percent
White	3,420	69.5%
Black or African American	20	0.4%
American Indian and Alaska Native	75	1.5%
Asian	51	1.0%
Native Hawaiian and Other Pacific Islander	0	0.0%
Some other race	666	13.5%
Two or more races	691	14.0%
Hispanic or Latino (of any race)	1,457	29.6%

== Education ==
New Castle is within Garfield Re-2 School District. The town is home to two elementary schools, a middle school, and a high school:

- Elk Creek Elementary School
- Kathryn Senor Elementary School
- Riverside Middle School
- Coal Ridge High School

== See also ==
- List of municipalities in Colorado
