= Parachute, Colorado =

Town in Colorado, United States

- Home rule town
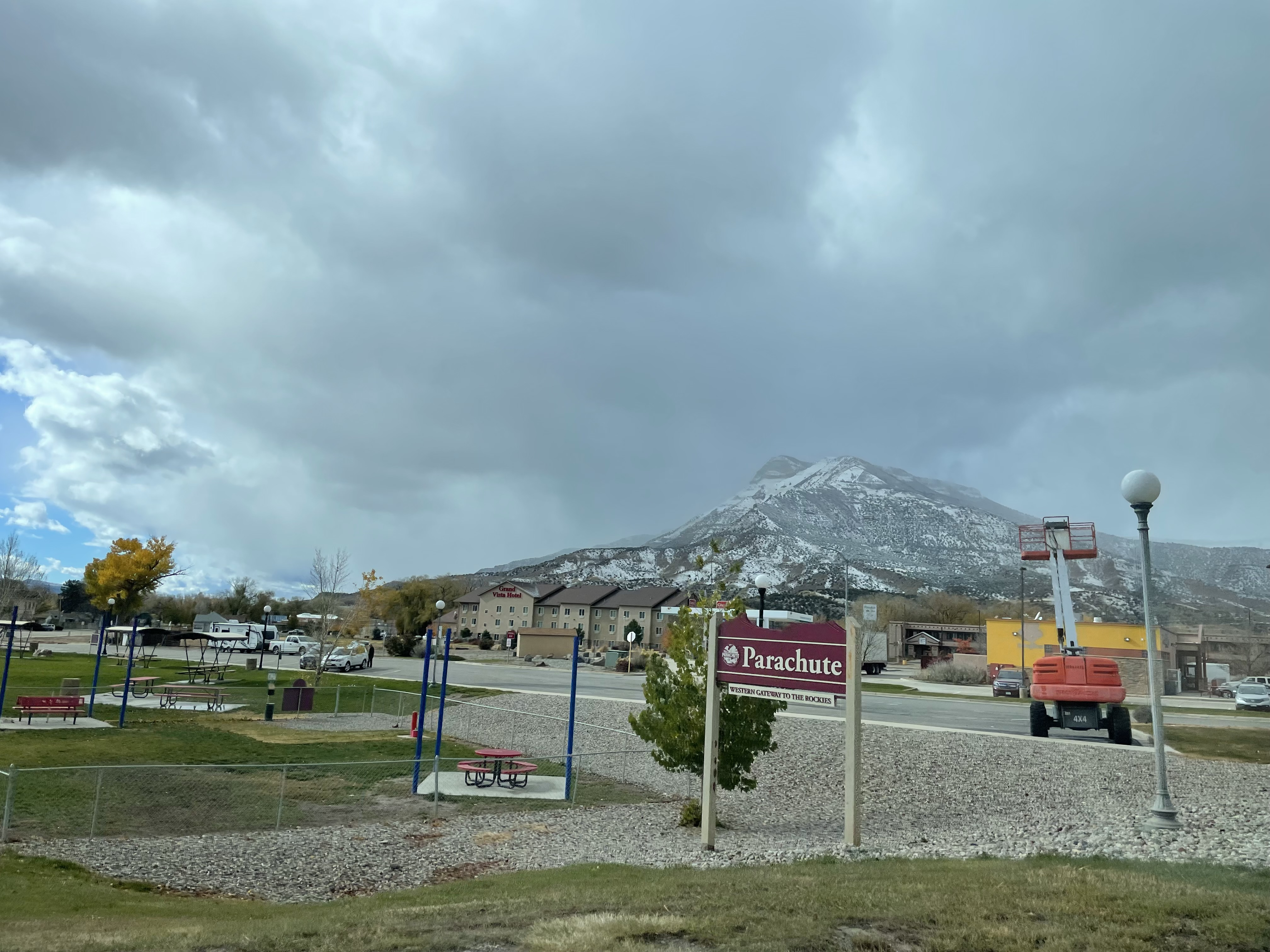
- Parachute in 2023
- Nickname: "Western Gateway to the Rockies"
- Motto: "A Safe Place to Land"
- Location of Parachute in Garfield County, Colorado
- Coordinates: 39°27′06″N 108°03′06″W
- Country: United States
- State: Colorado
- County: Garfield County
- Incorporated: 1908-04-01, as the Town of Grand Valley

Government
  - Type: Home rule municipality

Area
  - Total: 1.87 sq mi (4.85 km^{2})
  - Land: 1.81 sq mi (4.68 km^{2})
  - Water: 0.066 sq mi (0.17 km^{2})
- Elevation: 5,089 ft (1,551 m)

Population (2020)
  - Total: 1,390
  - Density: 769/sq mi (297/km^{2})
- Time zone: UTC-7 (Mountain (MST))
  - Summer (DST): UTC-6 (MDT)
- ZIP codes: 81635, 81636 (PO Box)
- Area code: 970
- FIPS code: 08-57400
- GNIS feature ID: 2413110
- Website: www.parachute.gov

Parachute is a home rule municipality in Garfield County, Colorado, United States. The population was 1,390 at the 2020 census.

The town is the birthplace of Willard Libby, recipient of the 1960 Nobel Prize in Chemistry.

== History ==
The town's name comes from Parachute Creek, which runs through the township before it merges with the Colorado River. The Ute people originally called the creek Pahchouc (meaning twins), with early settlers mispronouncing the word as parachute. In 1908, the town was renamed Grand Valley but in the 1980s was changed back to Parachute.

== Geography ==
Parachute is on the northwest side of the Colorado River where it is joined by Parachute Creek. Interstate 70 passes through the town, with access from Exit 75. I-70 leads east 42 miles (68 km) to Glenwood Springs, the county seat, and southwest 44 miles (71 km) to Grand Junction. Parachute is bordered to the southeast across the Colorado River by the unincorporated community of Battlement Mesa.

According to the United States Census Bureau, the town has a total area of 1.67 square miles (4.32 km^{2}), of which 1.61 square miles (4.16 km^{2}) is land and 0.062 square miles (0.16 km^{2}), or 3.70%, is water.

=== Climate ===
This climatic region is typified by large seasonal temperature differences, with warm to hot (and often humid) summers and cold (sometimes severely cold) winters. According to the Köppen Climate Classification system, Parachute has a humid continental climate, abbreviated "Dfb" on climate maps.

Climate data for Parachute
Month	Jan	Feb	Mar	Apr	May	Jun	Jul	Aug	Sep	Oct	Nov	Dec	Year
Mean daily maximum °C (°F)	3 (38)	8 (46)	13 (56)	18 (64)	24 (76)	31 (88)	34 (94)	34 (93)	28 (82)	19 (66)	11 (51)	5 (41)	19 (66)
Mean daily minimum °C (°F)	−12 (11)	−7 (19)	−2 (29)	1 (33)	6 (43)	10 (50)	14 (58)	14 (57)	9 (48)	2 (35)	−3 (27)	−8 (18)	2 (36)
Average precipitation mm (inches)	18 (0.7)	18 (0.7)	46 (1.8)	43 (1.7)	30 (1.2)	25 (1)	38 (1.5)	23 (0.9)	36 (1.4)	51 (2)	43 (1.7)	30 (1.2)	400 (15.8)
Source: Weatherbase

== Demographics ==
Historical population
Census	Pop.	Note	%±
1910	268		—
1920	228		−14.9%
1930	209		−8.3%
1940	230		10.0%
1950	296		28.7%
1960	245		−17.2%
1970	270		10.2%
1980	338		25.2%
1990	658		94.7%
2000	1,006		52.9%
2010	1,085		7.9%
2020	1,390		28.1%
U.S. Decennial Census

=== 2020 census ===
As of the 2020 census, Parachute had a population of 1,390. The median age was 28.8 years. 30.7% of residents were under the age of 18 and 8.8% of residents were 65 years of age or older. For every 100 females there were 106.8 males, and for every 100 females age 18 and over there were 111.2 males age 18 and over.

95.0% of residents lived in urban areas, while 5.0% lived in rural areas.

There were 504 households in Parachute, of which 41.7% had children under the age of 18 living in them. Of all households, 44.6% were married-couple households, 22.8% were households with a male householder and no spouse or partner present, and 21.0% were households with a female householder and no spouse or partner present. About 22.4% of all households were made up of individuals and 6.6% had someone living alone who was 65 years of age or older.

There were 542 housing units, of which 7.0% were vacant. The homeowner vacancy rate was 3.6% and the rental vacancy rate was 6.8%.

Racial composition as of the 2020 census
Race	Number	Percent
White	1,045	75.2%
Black or African American	18	1.3%
American Indian and Alaska Native	32	2.3%
Asian	8	0.6%
Native Hawaiian and Other Pacific Islander	0	0.0%
Some other race	126	9.1%
Two or more races	161	11.6%
Hispanic or Latino (of any race)	328	23.6%

== Education ==
Parachute is served by Garfield County School District 16. The town is home to an elementary, middle, and high school:

- Bea Underwood Elementary School
- Grand Valley Middle School
- Grand Valley High School

== Infrastructure ==
=== Transportation ===
Parachute is part of Bustang's West Line that connects Grand Junction to Denver.

== See also ==
- List of municipalities in Colorado
