= Garfield County, Colorado =

County in Colorado, United States

- County
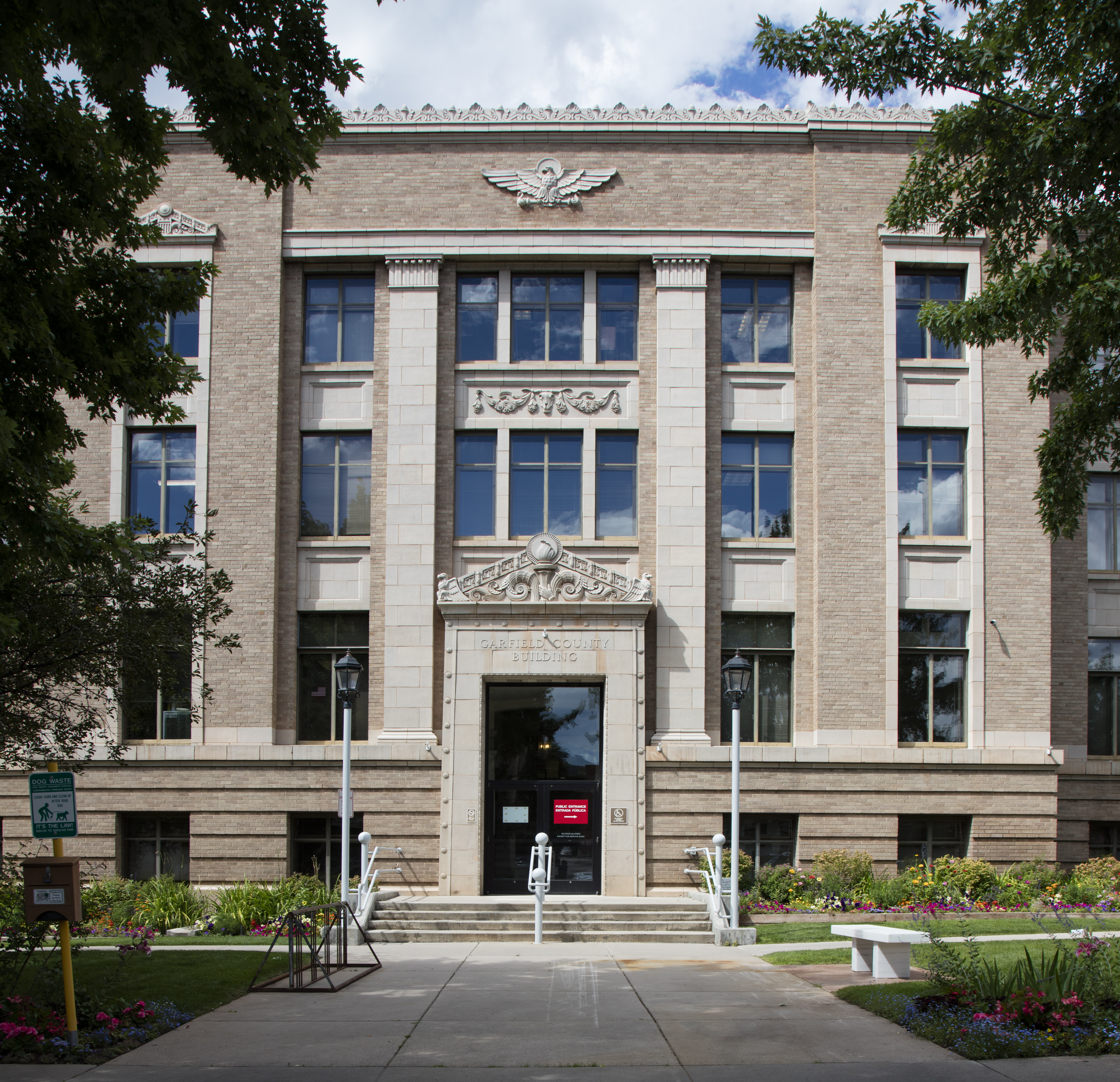
- Garfield County Courthouse in Glenwood Springs

- Flag
- Motto: "New Energy in the Wild West"
- Location within the U.S. state of Colorado
- Coordinates: 39.60°N 107.90°W
- Country: United States
- State: Colorado
- Founded: February 10, 1883
- Named for: James A. Garfield
- Seat: Glenwood Springs
- Largest city: Rifle

Area
  - Total: 2,956 sq mi (7,660 km^{2})
  - Land: 2,948 sq mi (7,640 km^{2})
  - Water: 8.3 sq mi (21 km^{2}) 0.3%

Population (2020)
  - Total: 61,685
  - Estimate (2025): 63,474 ▲
  - Density: 20.92/sq mi (8.079/km^{2})
- Time zone: UTC−7 (Mountain)
  - Summer (DST): UTC−6 (MDT)
- Congressional district: 3rd
- Website: www.garfieldcountyco.gov

Garfield County is a county located in the U.S. state of Colorado. As of the 2020 census, the population was 61,685. The county seat is Glenwood Springs, and the largest community is Rifle. The county is named in honor of United States President James A. Garfield.

Garfield County is included in the Rifle-Glenwood Springs Micropolitan Statistical Area, which also includes neighboring Pitkin County and is home to nearly 80,000 residents. The county is also included in the Glenwood Springs-Edwards combined statistical area.

== History ==
As was the case in much of western Colorado, Garfield County historically belonged to the Ute people. For much of the 19th century, this land was guaranteed to the Ute peoples by treaty with the United States government. The native inhabitants of the area were largely removed and sent to reservations in the early 1880s in the wake of the Meeker Massacre, in which a band of Ute members attacked the Indian agency on their reservation near the modern-day town of Meeker, killing 11 employees, including Indian agent (and town namesake) Nathan Meeker. This removal opened up vast swaths of western Colorado to white settlement.

Garfield County was founded on February 10, 1883, named in memory of President James A. Garfield, who was assassinated in September 1881. In April 1883, the town of Carbonate was incorporated and named the county seat. However, this was short-lived; Carbonate's remote location, difficult access, and severe winter weather made the town essentially impassable for much of the year. After just a few months, the city of Glenwood Springs was named the new county seat. Carbonate's post office closed in 1886, and by 1890, the town was completely abandoned.

In 1887, the Denver & Rio Grande Railroad arrived in Glenwood Springs, further fueling settlement and commerce in the surrounding area. Also in 1887, construction began on the Glenwood Hot Springs Resort, after the hot springs and vapor caves had been purchased by Walter Devereaux for $125,000 (equivalent to $4.25 million in 2025). In yet a third notable event to occur in 1887, the notorious old west gunslinger Doc Holliday died in Glenwood Springs from tuberculosis; a walking trail leading to his grave site remains a prominent tourist attraction in the city.

In 1896, a methane gas explosion in the Vulcan Mine on the Grand Hogback, near the town of New Castle, killed 49 workers and started a coal fire which still burns to this day. The mine eventually reopened, but suffered another explosion in 1913, killing an additional 37 workers. These underground coal fires have led the part of the Grand Hogback near the mine to be dubbed "Burning Mountain".

In 1904, US President Theodore Roosevelt went on a three-week bear hunt in Garfield County, an account of which was published in three 1905 issues of Outdoor Life Magazine. In 1905, the area was once again the target of old west gunslingers, as the outlaw Kid Curry and two accomplices robbed a train three miles west of the town of Grand Valley (now known as Parachute).

The county (specifically the city of Glenwood Springs) was one of the first areas in the United States to install electric lights. Some of the first in the area were installed inside the Fairy Caves of Iron Mountain, now part of Glenwood Caverns Adventure Park. The county was also the site of the first hydroelectric plant constructed in Colorado, built at Rifle Falls State Park in 1910. The plant changed the flow of the falls from one large waterfall to the three distinct falls seen today.

In 1965, Colorado voters approved the creation of a community college district on the Western Slope, establishing Colorado Mountain College. The same year, construction began on the college's Spring Valley campus, just south of Glenwood Springs. The Spring Valley campus, along with the Leadville campus, were CMC's original two campuses, known at the time of their creation as the West and East campuses, respectively. Classes began at Spring Valley in fall 1967; by 1974, the college had opened another campus in Rifle, and later opened facilities in downtown Glenwood Springs and Carbondale. Today, CMC is one of the largest community college systems in the state, serving more than 17,000 students across 11 campuses in western Colorado.

In 1969, the unincorporated community of Rulison, seven miles east of Parachute, was the site of the Project Rulison nuclear tests, which were conducted to see if underground detonation of nuclear weapons could liberate natural gas pockets, streamlining the process of gas and oil drilling and reducing the number of wells necessary to access deposits. While the tests were successful in liberating large gas deposits, the technology has never been used for commercial purposes due to public concern of nuclear contamination.

Garfield County received national attention after serial killer Ted Bundy escaped from the Garfield County Jail on the night of December 30, 1977, an escape which went undetected for 17 hours due to most of the jail's staff being on Christmas break. Bundy ultimately travelled to Florida and continued his nationwide murder spree, making the list of the FBI's Ten Most Wanted Fugitives before being captured in February 1978.

On May 2, 1982, ExxonMobil abruptly announced that, effective immediately, they would be shutting down oil shale operations in the region. As a result of this announcement, over 2,000 people found themselves instantly unemployed; this day came to be known as "Black Sunday" in Garfield County, marking the end of western Colorado's oil shale boom. Other oil companies in the area followed suit in ceasing oil shale operations, and between 1982 and 1985, over 24,000 people left Garfield and Mesa counties in search of oil work, causing a recession in western Colorado.

On July 6, 1994, 14 firefighters were killed battling the South Canyon Fire on Storm King Mountain, seven miles west of Glenwood Springs. The Storm King Mountain Memorial Trail closely follows the path the firefighters hiked to the fire; the path is lined with plaques and memorials, and the site of the blaze contains crosses where each responder fell. The South Canyon Fire remains the deadliest wildfire in Colorado history. Due to the fire's destruction of the mountain's vegetation, heavy rain in September 1994 caused a mudslide which buried 30 cars and injured two people on Interstate 70.

In May 2024, NBC News reported that Garfield County was the hardest county in America to buy a house in, due largely to high costs and heavy competition between buyers; Garfield County's population has increased by more than 40% since the turn of the century. Other cost factors likely result from the economic influence of Glenwood Springs and the nearby resort cities of Aspen and Vail. The neighboring Routt and Mesa counties were ranked numbers two and three, respectively.

== Geography ==
According to the U.S. Census Bureau, the county has a total area of 2,956 square miles (7,660 km^{2}), of which 2,948 square miles (7,640 km^{2}) is land and 8.3 square miles (21 km^{2}) (0.3%) is water.

=== Adjacent counties ===
- Rio Blanco County - north
- Routt County - northeast
- Eagle County - east
- Pitkin County - southeast
- Mesa County - south
- Grand County, Utah - southwest
- Uintah County, Utah - northwest

=== Major highways ===
- I-70
  - I-70 BS (Silt)
- US 6
- SH 13
- SH 82
- SH 133
- SH 139
- SH 325

=== Protected areas ===
- Flat Tops Wilderness
- Grand Mesa National Forest
- Harvey Gap State Park
- Rifle Falls State Park
- Rifle Gap State Park
- Routt National Forest
- White River National Forest

=== Scenic byways ===
- Dinosaur Diamond Prehistoric Highway National Scenic Byway
- Flat Tops Trail Scenic Byway
- West Elk Loop Scenic Byway

== Demographics ==
Historical population
Census	Pop.	Note	%±
1890	4,478		—
1900	5,835		30.3%
1910	10,144		73.8%
1920	9,304		−8.3%
1930	9,975		7.2%
1940	10,560		5.9%
1950	11,625		10.1%
1960	12,017		3.4%
1970	14,821		23.3%
1980	22,514		51.9%
1990	29,974		33.1%
2000	43,791		46.1%
2010	56,389		28.8%
2020	61,685		9.4%
2025 (est.)	63,474	▲	2.9%
U.S. Decennial Census; 1790-1960 1900-1990; 1990-2000 2010-2020

=== 2020 census ===
As of the 2020 census, the county had a population of 61,685. Of the residents, 25.2% were under the age of 18 and 13.8% were 65 years of age or older; the median age was 36.8 years. For every 100 females there were 101.9 males, and for every 100 females age 18 and over there were 101.6 males. 67.9% of residents lived in urban areas and 32.1% lived in rural areas.

Garfield County, Colorado – Racial and ethnic composition Note: the US Census treats Hispanic/Latino as an ethnic category. This table excludes Latinos from the racial categories and assigns them to a separate category. Hispanics/Latinos may be of any race.
Race / Ethnicity (NH = Non-Hispanic)	Pop 2000	Pop 2010	Pop 2020	% 2000	% 2010	% 2020
White alone (NH)	35,449	38,784	38,636	80.95%	68.78%	62.63%
Black or African American alone (NH)	128	236	277	0.29%	0.42%	0.45%
Native American or Alaska Native alone (NH)	227	297	300	0.52%	0.53%	0.49%
Asian alone (NH)	183	342	397	0.42%	0.61%	0.64%
Pacific Islander alone (NH)	27	31	34	0.06%	0.05%	0.06%
Other race alone (NH)	29	93	309	0.07%	0.16%	0.50%
Mixed race or Multiracial (NH)	448	628	2,168	1.02%	1.11%	3.51%
Hispanic or Latino (any race)	7,300	15,978	19,564	16.67%	28.34%	31.72%
Total	43,791	56,389	61,685	100.00%	100.00%	100.00%

The racial makeup of the county was 68.1% White, 0.5% Black or African American, 1.4% American Indian and Alaska Native, 0.7% Asian, 0.1% Native Hawaiian and Pacific Islander, 15.8% from some other race, and 13.4% from two or more races. Hispanic or Latino residents of any race comprised 31.7% of the population.

There were 22,364 households in the county, of which 35.7% had children under the age of 18 living with them and 21.3% had a female householder with no spouse or partner present. About 22.7% of all households were made up of individuals and 9.1% had someone living alone who was 65 years of age or older.

There were 24,091 housing units, of which 7.2% were vacant. Among occupied housing units, 65.9% were owner-occupied and 34.1% were renter-occupied. The homeowner vacancy rate was 1.3% and the rental vacancy rate was 4.4%.

== Education ==
Five public school districts cover portions of Garfield County (this includes school districts with schools and/or administrative facilities in other counties that cover any portion of this county, no matter how slight):

- Roaring Fork School District RE-1, serving Glenwood Springs and Carbondale
- Garfield County School District RE-2, serving Rifle, New Castle, and Silt
- Garfield County School District 16, serving Parachute and Battlement Mesa
- De Beque School District 49-JT
- Eagle County School District RE 50 - Carbonate is in the school district limits

There are five public high schools in the county limits:

- Coal Ridge High School (New Castle postal address) - Garfield School District RE-2
- Glenwood Springs High School (Glenwood Springs) - Roaring Fork School District RE-1
- Grand Valley High School (Parachute) - Garfield County School District 16
- Rifle High School (Rifle) - Garfield School District RE-2
- Roaring Fork High School (Carbondale) - Roaring Fork School District RE-1

The county is also home to private schools, including Colorado Rocky Mountain School (which has a Carbondale post office address), St. Stephen Catholic School in Glenwood Springs, and Liberty Classical Academy in New Castle.

=== Higher education ===
The county is home to multiple campuses of Colorado Mountain College, a community college serving much of western Colorado. CMC operates a flagship residential campus at Spring Valley, just south of Glenwood Springs. Additional branch campuses in Garfield County are located in Glenwood Springs, Rifle, and Carbondale.

== Economy ==
=== Top employers ===
As of its 2023 Annual Comprehensive Financial Report, Garfield County's top employers are:

#	Employer	Employee range
1	Valley View Hospital	1,000 - 1,250
2	Roaring Fork School District RE-1	500 - 999
3	Garfield County School District RE-2	500 - 999
4	Grand River Hospital	500 - 999
5	City Market	500 - 999
6	Garfield County	250 - 499
7	Colorado Mountain College	250 - 499
8	Walmart	250 - 499
9	City of Glenwood Springs	200 - 499
10	Alpine Bank	100 - 249

== Government ==
=== Structure ===
Garfield County is governed by a board of three county commissioners, who oversee the county's financial affairs, infrastructure developments, public health matters, and general economic development.

=== County offices ===
As the seat of Garfield County, the city of Glenwood Springs is home to many of the county's offices, including all of its elected offices (with the exception of the coroner's office, which is located in the town of Silt). The Garfield County courthouse, sheriff's office, jail, and county administration building are all located on 8th Street in downtown Glenwood Springs. The county also maintains several other offices and public services in the city of Rifle, including the Garfield County Landfill, the Rifle Garfield County Airport, and the county's emergency services dispatch center.

=== Emergency services ===
Garfield County is served by multiple emergency service agencies:

==== Law enforcement ====
- Carbondale Police Department
- Colorado State Patrol – Glenwood Springs Troop
- Garfield County Sheriff's Office
- Glenwood Springs Police Department
- New Castle Police Department
- Parachute Police Department
- Rifle Police Department
- Silt Police Department

==== Fire departments ====
- Carbondale & Rural Fire Protection District
- Colorado River Fire Rescue
- Glenwood Springs Fire Department
- Grand Valley Fire Protection District

=== Healthcare ===
Garfield County is served by two primary hospitals: Valley View Hospital is located in Glenwood Springs, while Grand River Health is located in Rifle. Both hospitals operate various clinics and health services locations throughout Garfield County and the surrounding areas.

=== Public transportation ===
Public transportation in the county is provided by the Roaring Fork Transportation Authority. RFTA is the second-largest public transportation entity in Colorado (behind the Denver area's Regional Transportation District), and the largest rural public transit provider in the United States, operating busses across a nearly 70-mile stretch from Rifle to Aspen. Local transportation services in the county include Ride Glenwood Springs, the Carbondale Circulator, and the Parachute Area Transit System.

Bustang, Colorado's inter-city bus service, runs its east-west route from Denver Union Station to Grand Junction, making stops in Glenwood Springs, Rifle, and Parachute.

Amtrak, running from Chicago, Illinois to Emeryville, California, makes a stop in Glenwood Springs.

Garfield County is home to two airports: Rifle Garfield County Airport is located just east of the city of Rifle, while KGWS Sumers Airpark (formerly known as the Glenwood Springs Municipal Airport) is located in south Glenwood Springs.

=== Prison ===
The Rifle Correctional Center, operated by the Colorado Department of Corrections, is a 192-bed minimum security prison located in unincorporated Garfield County, 9 miles (14 km) north of Rifle.

=== Elected officials ===
Position	Elected Official
County Commissioner	Tom Jankovsky (R)
County Commissioner	Perry Will (R)
County Commissioner	Mike Samson (R)
Assessor	Jim Yellico (R)
Clerk & Recorder	Jackie Harmon (R)
Coroner	Robert Glassmire (R)
Sheriff	Lou Vallario (R)
Surveyor	Scott Aibner (R)
Treasurer/Public Trustee	Carrie Couey (R)

Garfield County lies within Colorado's 9th Judicial District, represented by District Attorney Benjamin Sollars. The 9th District, which serves Garfield, Pitkin and Rio Blanco counties, operates its main office at the Garfield County Courthouse in Glenwood Springs.

== Politics ==
Voting participation rates in Garfield County are above the U.S. national average. In the 2018 general election, 65% of eligible voters participated. In the 2020 presidential election, 84.47% eligible voters participated. The county leans slightly Republican based on vote totals in elections from 2008 to 2018, with an estimated range of 2 to 1,000 votes often determining candidate outcomes for the county.

Garfield County has primarily voted for Republican Party candidates in presidential elections throughout its history, with the county only failing to back the Republican candidate ten times from 1884 to 2020. Although the county includes the relatively liberal cities of Carbondale and Glenwood Springs, this is somewhat outweighed by the nearby towns of Rifle, Silt, Parachute, and Battlement Mesa. Until 2020, the most recent Democratic win was by Bill Clinton in 1992, but Republicans were held to a plurality of the county's votes in half of the six following presidential elections prior to 2020. Notably, Barack Obama lost the county to John McCain by two votes in 2008.

In 2020, Joe Biden became the first Democratic presidential candidate to win the county since Clinton in 1992, with about 50% of the vote. No Democratic presidential candidate has won a majority of the vote in the county since Lyndon B. Johnson in 1964, although in 2020, Biden was just 26 votes shy of having the majority of the vote in the county. The county's leftward trend continued significantly in 2022, during which it backed the Democratic candidates and eventual winners in every statewide race. In 2024 it once again went Democratic, voting for Kamala Harris, though by a slightly narrower plurality than in 2020. It voted Republican by 5% in the 2024 Colorado State Board of Regents at-large election.

The county lies in Colorado's 3rd congressional district, represented by Republican Jeff Hurd.

United States presidential election results for Garfield County, Colorado
Year	Republican		Democratic		Third party(ies)	
Year	No.	%	No.	%	No.	%
1884	245	63.80%	139	36.20%	0	0.00%
1888	1,110	56.63%	820	41.84%	30	1.53%
1892	634	47.00%	0	0.00%	715	53.00%
1896	173	7.61%	2,065	90.81%	36	1.58%
1900	826	32.29%	1,700	66.46%	32	1.25%
1904	1,639	53.09%	1,286	41.66%	162	5.25%
1908	1,504	41.99%	1,898	52.99%	180	5.03%
1912	824	21.10%	1,806	46.25%	1,275	32.65%
1916	1,139	29.86%	2,479	64.98%	197	5.16%
1920	1,912	54.32%	1,489	42.30%	119	3.38%
1924	1,934	51.27%	917	24.31%	921	24.42%
1928	2,435	60.03%	1,562	38.51%	59	1.45%
1932	1,734	36.05%	2,946	61.25%	130	2.70%
1936	1,945	42.95%	2,406	53.14%	177	3.91%
1940	2,894	57.18%	2,141	42.30%	26	0.51%
1944	2,588	57.97%	1,865	41.78%	11	0.25%
1948	2,416	50.10%	2,364	49.03%	42	0.87%
1952	3,914	68.44%	1,777	31.07%	28	0.49%
1956	3,332	62.90%	1,953	36.87%	12	0.23%
1960	3,215	58.04%	2,313	41.76%	11	0.20%
1964	2,282	41.58%	3,196	58.24%	10	0.18%
1968	3,157	52.24%	2,273	37.61%	613	10.14%
1972	4,452	66.27%	2,088	31.08%	178	2.65%
1976	4,699	59.74%	2,852	36.26%	315	4.00%
1980	5,416	58.08%	2,639	28.30%	1,270	13.62%
1984	7,111	69.14%	3,076	29.91%	98	0.95%
1988	6,358	57.21%	4,620	41.57%	136	1.22%
1992	4,404	31.51%	5,082	36.36%	4,490	32.13%
1996	6,281	44.43%	5,722	40.47%	2,135	15.10%
2000	9,103	53.22%	6,087	35.59%	1,914	11.19%
2004	11,123	53.87%	9,228	44.69%	296	1.43%
2008	11,359	49.21%	11,357	49.20%	366	1.59%
2012	12,535	51.36%	11,305	46.32%	568	2.33%
2016	13,132	49.61%	11,271	42.58%	2,067	7.81%
2020	14,717	47.62%	15,427	49.92%	760	2.46%
2024	14,493	47.71%	15,128	49.80%	755	2.49%

United States Senate election results for Garfield County, Colorado2
Year	Republican		Democratic		Third party(ies)	
Year	No.	%	No.	%	No.	%
2020	15,027	48.81%	14,999	48.72%	761	2.47%

United States Senate election results for Garfield County, Colorado3
Year	Republican		Democratic		Third party(ies)	
Year	No.	%	No.	%	No.	%
2022	10,924	44.56%	12,777	52.12%	814	3.32%

Colorado Gubernatorial election results for Garfield County
Year	Republican		Democratic		Third party(ies)	
Year	No.	%	No.	%	No.	%
2022	10,444	42.56%	13,443	54.78%	651	2.65%

== Communities ==
=== Cities ===
- Glenwood Springs (county seat)
- Rifle

=== Towns ===
- Carbonate (Note: Despite having no permanent population since the 1890 US Census, Carbonate's property owners voted to reactivate the local government in 2014. The town is the only incorporated municipality in Colorado with no permanent population.)
- Carbondale
- New Castle
- Parachute
- Silt

=== Census-designated places ===
- Battlement Mesa
- Catherine
- Cattle Creek
- Chacra
- Mulford
- No Name

=== Unincorporated communities ===
- Antlers
- Kiggin
- Rulison
- Satank
- Sunlight

=== Ghost towns ===
- Anvil Points
- Atchee
- Carbonera

== See also ==
- Bibliography of Colorado
- Geography of Colorado
- History of Colorado
  - National Register of Historic Places listings in Garfield County, Colorado
- Index of Colorado-related articles
- List of Colorado-related lists
  - List of counties in Colorado
  - List of statistical areas in Colorado
- Outline of Colorado
