= Granada Bridge =

Granada Bridge may refer to:

- Granada Bridge (Granada, Colorado), listed on the NRHP in Colorado
- Granada Bridge (Ormond Beach) in Florida
