= Little Thompson River Bridge =

- U.S. National Register of Historic Places
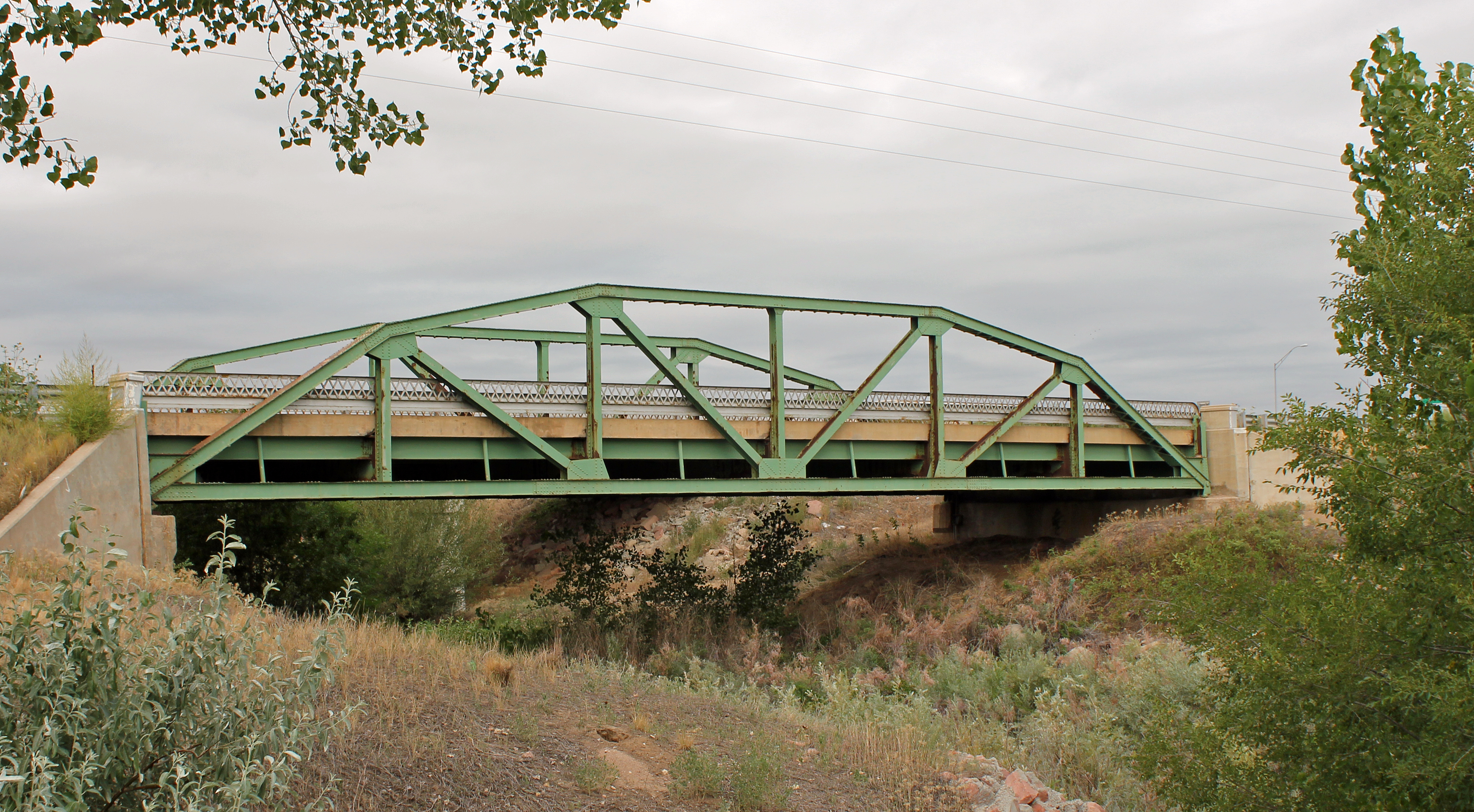
- Bridge in 2012.

- Location within Colorado
- Location: Interstate 25 service road at milepost 249.90, near Berthoud, Colorado
- Coordinates: 40.30110°N 104.97978°W
- Area: less than one acre
- Built: 1938
- Architect: Colorado Department of Highways
- Architectural style: camelback pony truss
- MPS: Highway Bridges in Colorado MPS
- NRHP reference No.: 02001129
- Added to NRHP: October 15, 2002

The Little Thompson River Bridge, in Weld County, Colorado near Berthoud, Colorado, was built in 1938. It was listed on the National Register of Historic Places in 2002.

It was designed by the Colorado Department of Highways, fabricated by Midwest Steel & Iron Works, and installed by contractor Gardner Brothers. The highways department specified "a rigid-connected camelback pony truss, supported by reinforced concrete abutments with angled wingwalls."

The bridge was altered by addition of flex beam guardrails around 1980.

It is located on what is now a service road for Interstate 25, at milepost 249.90, near Berthoud. It is the eastern-most of three north–south bridges at the site; the other two carry southbound and northbound Interstate 25 traffic.

In May 2021, there is ongoing construction at I-25's Little Thompson River crossing, covered in Colorado Department of Transportation photos.
