= Black squirrel (disambiguation) =

Black squirrel may refer to:

- The black squirrel, a melanistic population of squirrels in North America (affected species are Sciurus carolinensis and Sciurus niger);
- The Calabrian black squirrel, a distinct species found in the south of Italy, endemic to the regions of Calabria and Basilicata;
- The black giant squirrel, a distinct species found in Southeast Asia and Indonesia;
- Black Squirrel Radio, an American radio station;
- The black squirrel monkey, a primate endemic to the central Amazon in Brazil;
- The Black Squirrel Creek Bridge, a dismantled bridge in El Paso County, Colorado, USA;
- Black Squirrel (song), alternate title for Broken, Beat & Scarred, a single from the American rock band Metallica.
