= Cherry Creek Dam =

Dam in southeast metro Denver, Colorado, USA

Coordinates: 39°38′53″N 104°51′38″W

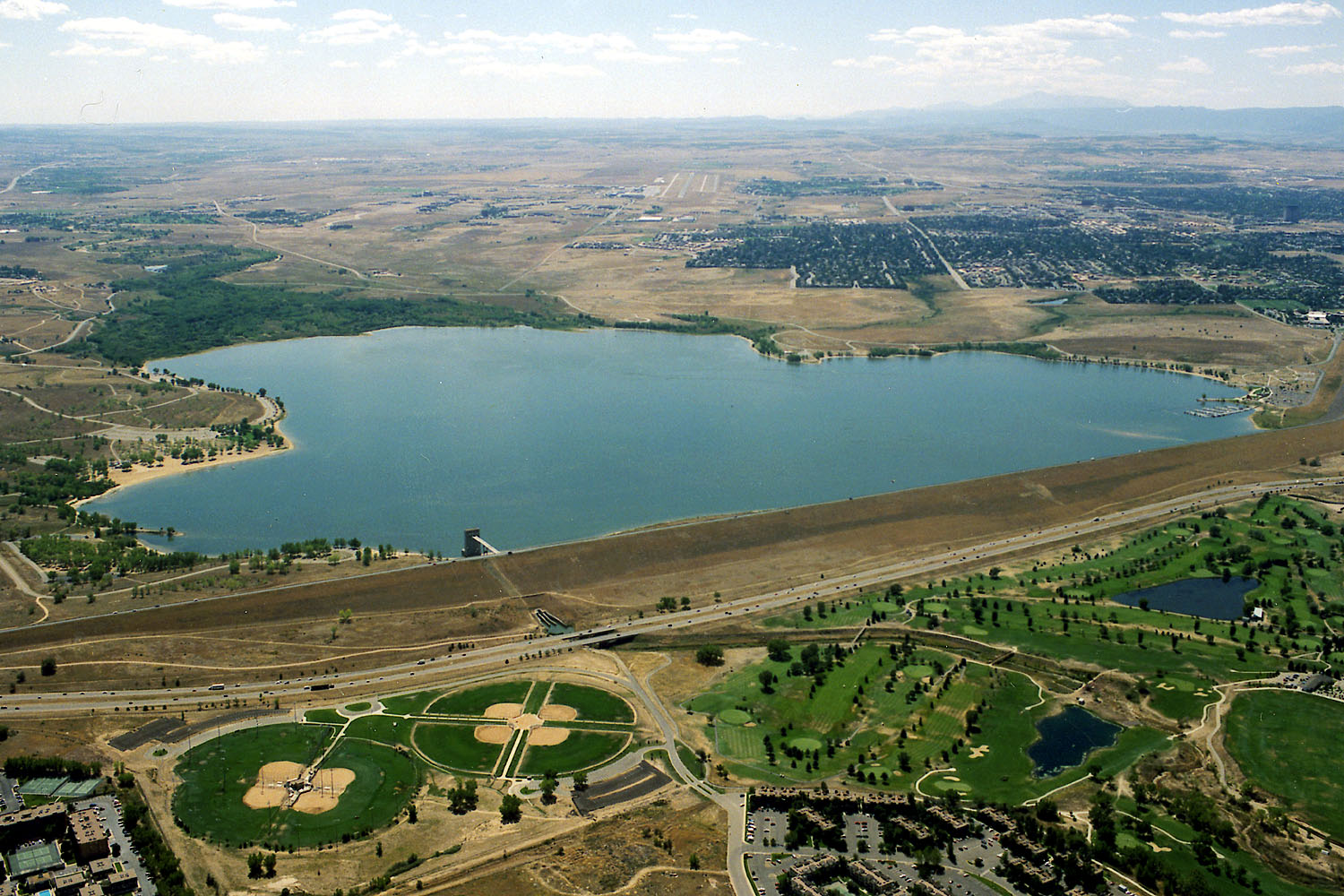
- Interactive map of Cherry Creek Dam
- Country: United States
- Status: Operational
- Opening date: 1950
- Built by: United States Army Corps of Engineers
- Designed by: United States Army Corps of Engineers

Dam and spillways
- Height (foundation): 141 ft (43 m)
- Length: 14,300 ft (4,400 m)

Reservoir
- Total capacity: 134,470 acre⋅ft (165,870,000 m^{3})
- Surface area: 880 acres (360 ha)
- Normal elevation: 1,692 m (5,551 ft)

Cherry Creek Dam (National ID # CO01280) is a dam in Arapahoe County, Colorado, southeast of Denver.

The earthen dam was constructed between 1948 and 1950 by the United States Army Corps of Engineers with a height of 141 feet (43 m) and a length of 14,300 feet (4,400 m) at its crest. It impounds Cherry Creek, a tributary of the South Platte River, for flood control.

The dam and reservoir are owned and operated by the Corps of Engineers. The dam is located on Cherry Creek at its confluence with Cottonwood Creek and consists of an earthen embankment, an outlet structure for releasing stored water, and a spillway through which excess water can flow into the adjacent Toll Gate and Sand Creek drainage basins during times of extreme water levels.

The Cherry Creek Dam outlet manages reservoir levels by releasing water from the reservoir into Cherry Creek to downstream users. Release rates are generally less than 100 cubic feet of water per second (cfs). One cubic foot of water, or cfs, is equivalent to 7.5 gallons. The outlet structure can release water at a rate of up to 10,000 cfs when operating to reduce flood risks during periods of high runoff. In addition, the spillway is designed to pass up to 45,000 cfs into Toll Gate Creek on to Sand Creek and ultimately into the Platte River.

The reservoir it creates, Cherry Creek Reservoir, has a water surface of 880 acres (360 ha), and a maximum capacity of 134,470 acre-feet (170 million cubic meters). Recreation at the reservoir centers on the facilities of the adjacent Cherry Creek State Park, which offers camping, radio-controlled aircraft, picnicking, opportunities for bird watching, cross country skiing, fishing, horseback riding and an outdoor shooting range.

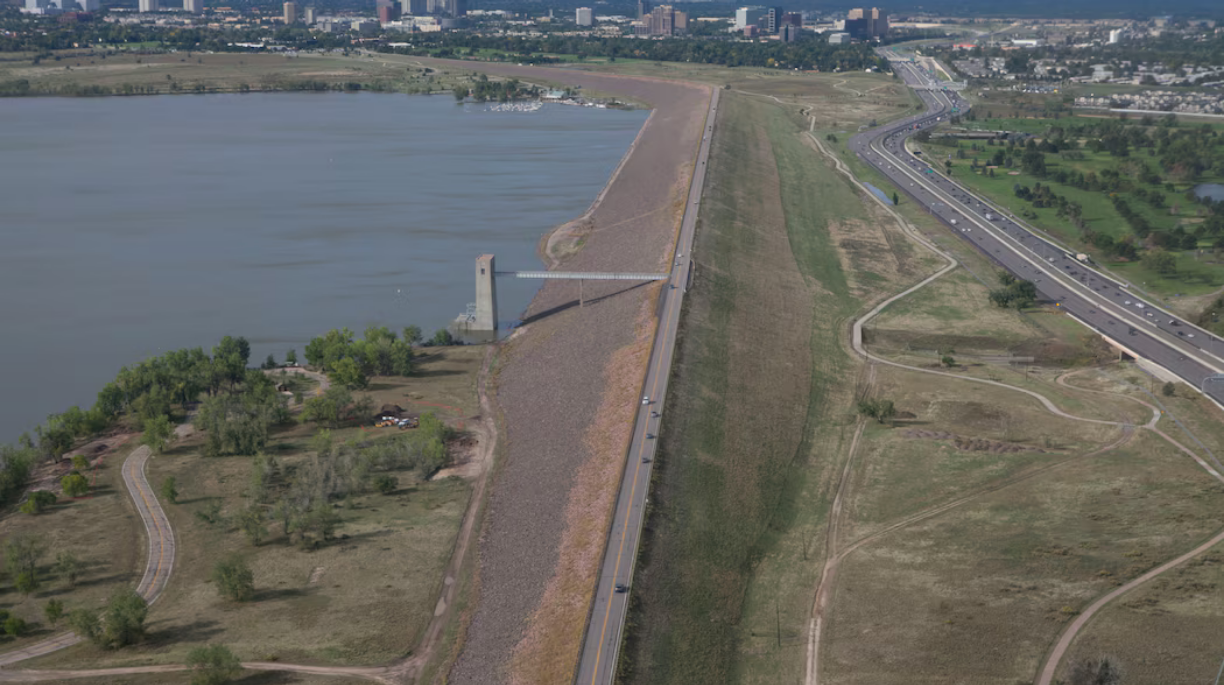
Cherry Creek Dam built in 1948-1950, located at the southeast edge of Denver in Aurora, Colorado.

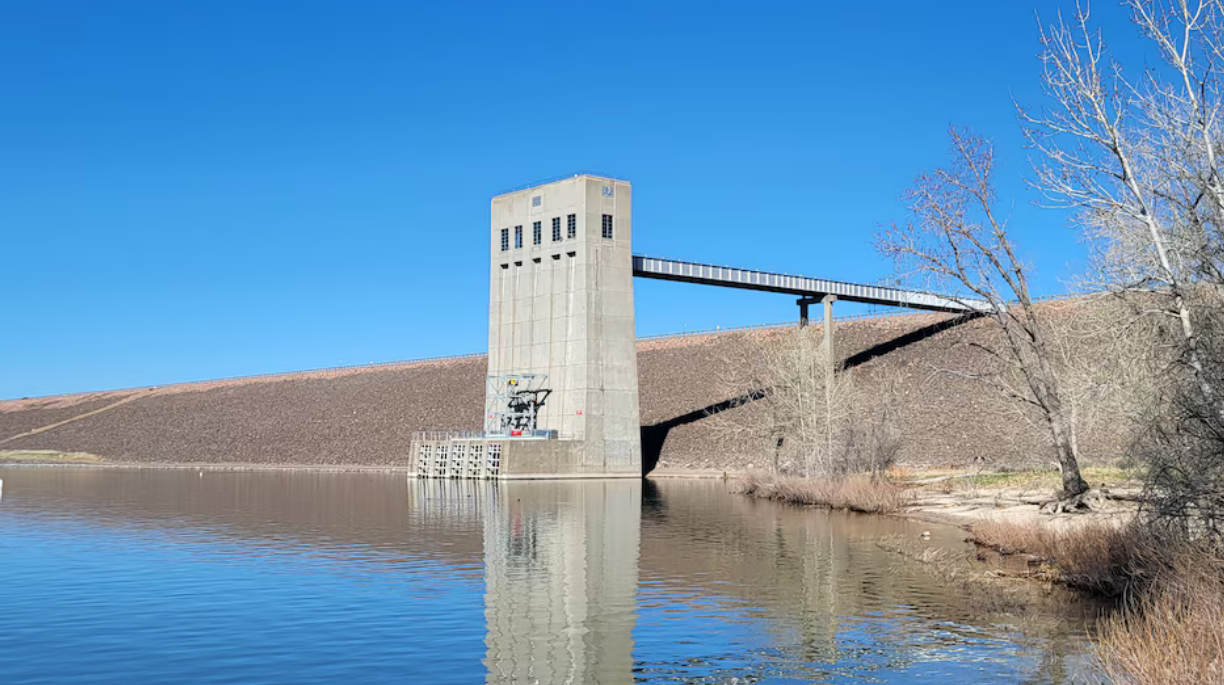
The Cherry Creek Dam outlet manages reservoir levels by releasing water from the reservoir to downstream users.
