= Colorado Department of Highways =

Historic state government agency of Colorado

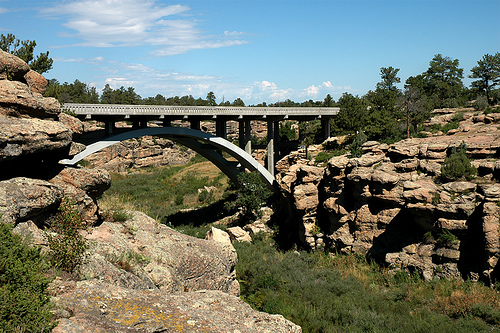
Cherry Creek Bridge, built in 1948

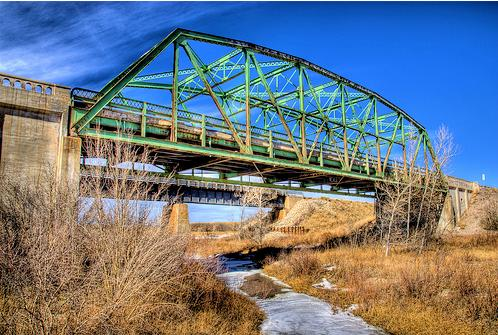
Black Squirrel Creek Bridge, built in 1935

The Colorado Department of Highways is the antecedent of today's Colorado Department of Transportation.

Along with many other functions, it served as a bridge architect and at times as a bridge builder. Many of its bridges are listed on the U.S. National Register of Historic Places.

Studies of Colorado's historic bridges, to assess which ones could qualify for National Register listing, were conducted in 1983, 1987, 2000, and 2011. The latter study evaluated "712 bridges and grade separations" which had been built during 1959 to 1968.

Works (attribution) include:

- Big Thompson River Bridge I, US 34 at milepost 65.53, Estes Park
- Big Thompson River Bridge II, US 34 at milepost 66.22, Estes Park
- Big Thompson River Bridge III, US 34 at milepost 85.15, Loveland
- Big Thompson River Bridge IV, US 34 at milepost 86.04, Loveland
- Black Squirrel Creek Bridge, built 1935, US 24 at milepost 327.33, Falcon No longer exists. Replaced in 2012.
- Bridge over Arkansas River, U.S. Hwy 24, Buena Vista
- Cherry Creek Bridge, CO 83 at milepost 46.30, Franktown
- Colorado River Bridge, I-70 Frontage Rd. at milepost 62.90, De Beque
- Cottonwood Creek Bridge, On Vincent Dr. over Cottonwood Creek., Colorado Springs
- Dolores River Bridge, CO 90 at milepost 15.22, Bedrock
- Dotsero Bridge, I-70 Service Rd. at milepost 133.51, Dotsero
- Eagle River Bridge, US 6 at milepost 150.24, Eagle
- Granada Bridge, US 385 at milepost 97.32, Granada
- Gunnison River Bridge I, US 50 Service Rd. at milepost 155.41, Gunnison
- Gunnison River Bridge II, US-50 Service Rd. at milepost 155.59, Gunnison
- Little Fountain Creek Bridge, CO 115 at milepost 36.84, Widefield No longer exists. Replaced in 2004.
- Little Thompson River Bridge, I-25 Service Rd. at milepost 249.90, Berthoud
- Maitland Arroyo Bridge, CO 69 at Milepost 3.0, Walsenburg
- Marble Town Hall, 407 Main St., Marble
- Maroon Creek Bridge, CO 82, Aspen
- Ohio-Colorado Smelting and Refining Company Smokestack, NE of Salida at jct. of SR 150 and 152, Salida
- Plum Bush Creek Bridge, US 36 at milepost 138.16, Last Chance
- Rainbow Arch Bridge, CO 52, Fort Morgan
- Rio Grande Railroad Viaduct, CO 120 at milepost 0.17, Florence
- Rito Seco Creek Culvert, CO 142 at milepost 33.81, San Luis
- Rouch Gulch Bridge, US 50 at milepost 230.12, Swissvale
- San Luis Bridge, Off CO 159, San Luis
- Spring Creek Bridge, US 24 at milepost 430.32, Vona
- West Plum Bush Creek Bridge, US 36 at milepost 134.59, Last Chance
