= Cherry Creek (Colorado) =

Tributary of the South Platte River

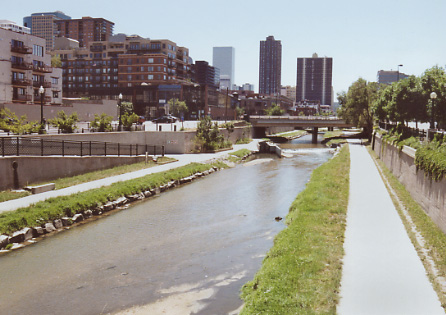
- Cherry Creek in Denver

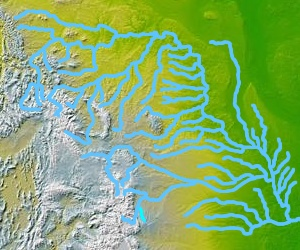
- Cherry Creek's location in the western part of the Missouri River watershed, highlighted in light blue

Physical characteristics
- Source
  - location: Confluence of West Cherry Creek and East Cherry Creek
  - coordinates: 39°17′08.7″N 104°42′59.0″W
- Mouth
  - location: Confluence with South Platte
  - coordinates: 39°45′16.4″N 105°00′29.6″W
  - elevation: 5,167 ft (1,575 m)

Basin features
- Progression: South Platte—Platte— Missouri—Mississippi

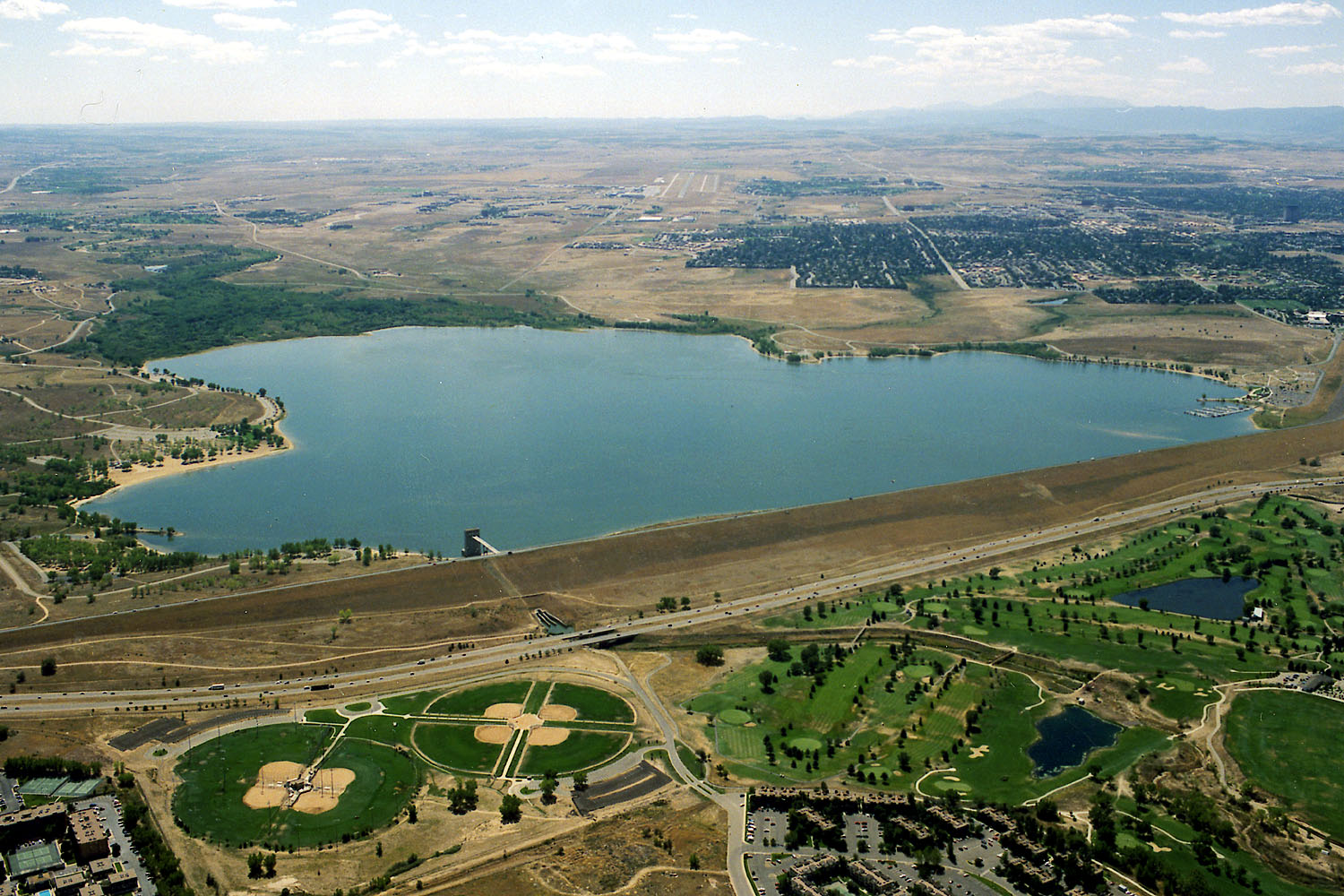
Cherry Creek Dam and reservoir. View is to the south.

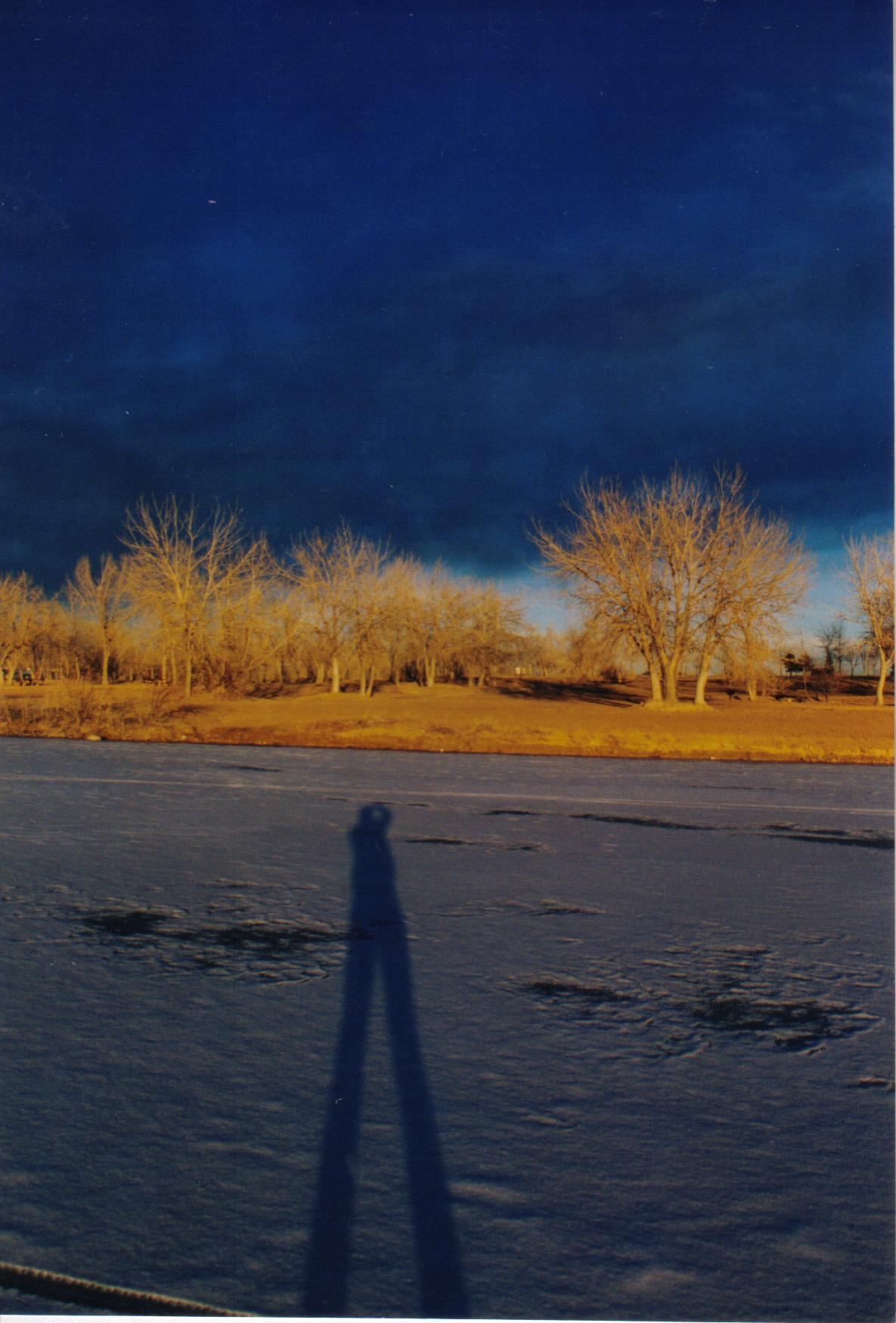
Frozen Cherry Creek reservoir.

Cherry Creek is a tributary of the South Platte River, 48.0 miles (77.2 km) long, in Colorado in the United States. The creek is named for the profusion of black chokecherry shrubs (Prunus virginiana demissa) that grow along its banks.

== Course ==
Cherry Creek rises in the high plateau, east of the Front Range, in northwestern El Paso County. It flows north, through Castlewood Canyon State Park where it is spanned by the historic Cherry Creek Bridge, past Parker and through portions of Centennial and Aurora, and into southeast Denver. It flows northwest through Denver, becoming an urban stream and joining the South Platte River at Confluence Park in central Denver just west of downtown and approximately 5 miles (8 km) east of the foothills, near the site where the city of Denver was founded in 1858.

The 140-foot-high (43 m) Cherry Creek Dam, completed in 1950, forms Cherry Creek Reservoir in Cherry Creek State Park, providing flood control and irrigation. The dam lies immediately southeast and southwest of the Denver and Aurora city limits, respectively, approximately 8 miles (13 km) from the creek's confluence with the South Platte.

The creek lends its name to the Cherry Creek neighborhood in south-central Denver, and also in particular to its Cherry Creek Shopping Center. In addition, the creek runs through the suburban Cherry Creek Public Schools district. The Cherry Creek Bike Path follows the creek from Confluence Park in downtown Denver through Cherry Creek State Park and south towards Parker and Castlewood Canyon.

== History ==
Cherry Creek was the focus of the early part of the Pikes Peak Gold Rush in 1858 and 1859, when gold was discovered at the "Cherry Creek diggings," in what was then western Kansas Territory. The first edition of the Rocky Mountain News on 23 April 1859 identified itself on the masthead as being located at "Cherry Creek, K. T." Gold was discovered at Russellville (now in Douglas County) in the upper Cherry Creek drainage, and in the Platte River near its confluence with Cherry Creek.

Speer Boulevard, running along Cherry Creek, is part of Denver's parks and parkway system, and is listed on the National Register of Historic Places.

Castlewood Dam was constructed on Cherry Creek in 1890 to provide irrigation to surrounding farms in Douglas County. After decades of notoriously leaking, the dam suffered an utter collapse following heavy rains at 1 am on 3 August 1933, resulting in a 15-foot wall of water rushing down Cherry Creek to Denver, some 15 miles away. Warnings to the city by 4 am allowed most people to move out of the way of the flood waters. The dam's remnants are still visible at Castlewood Canyon State Park.

== Ecology ==
The creek itself is locally well known for its population of crayfish. Some local inhabitants catch and eat these crustaceans. The creek is also home to a large population of small fish (Including immature trout and sunfish, crappie, yellow perch and others). Large fish are largely absent, except when the Cherry Creek Dam is partially opened and floodwaters carry fish such as rainbow trout, brown trout, mature sunfish, walleye, and even northern pike downstream. The creek's ecosystem was damaged during a drought in the first few years of the 21st century. Plants along the banks, damaged by the drought, dropped organic debris into the water, increasing biochemical oxygen demand substantially. Decreased flow also limited the ecosystem's capacity to supply needed oxygen. Decreased flow also prevented the washing away of pollutants such as NPK fertilizers, insecticides and organic solvents. Water temperatures also rose during this period, compounding the problem. As of 2005, however, the creek is substantially healthier.

The area around the creek is also known for its snake population, which includes garter snakes, western hognose snakes, bullsnakes and occasionally rattlesnakes. Amphibians native to Colorado can be found at the creek as well. These include, the plains leopard frog, woodhouse's frog, and the striped chorus frog. The bullfrog, a non-native species, is also located in the Cherry Creek. In recent years, bullfrogs have contributed to the decimation of native amphibian species populations at the creek.

For some of its distance, notably in the region of Four Mile Historical Park, the creek is flanked on each side by approximately 15 metres (50 ft) of woods and scrub. This corridor is deliberately left semi-wild, though there is a dirt bike track on the northern bank. This corridor is one of the few places within the Denver metro area where the creek's namesake plant, the chokecherry, can still be seen in a largely wild state. Large trees such as cottonwood are common, as are willows. Edible plants such as wild asparagus and prickly pear are occasionally found. Virginia creeper and imported plants such as the Russian olive, dandelion are present. Despite the limited area this corridor offers, raccoons, beaver, foxes, coyotes, and even deer are not uncommon sights along the creek. The beaver typically have lodges upstream (east) of Denver, but swim downstream to forage.

Petrified wood is extremely common in the creek. It is washed down, sometimes in fairly large pieces, from 'petrified forests' upstream. Fossil mammal bones have also been found.

Historical records kept at what is now Four Mile Historical Park indicate that prior to the construction of the Cherry Creek Dam, the creek's water level rose and fell regularly. Since the dam's completion, however, this flood cycle has been interrupted. Now, the flow is regulated almost exclusively by the dam's operators. The level of the creek is kept constant except when water needs to be vented from the Cherry Creek Reservoir. When the dam's floodgates are opened for this venting, the creek's level may rise as much as two feet, sometimes in less than an hour.

== See also ==
- List of Colorado rivers
