= Big Thompson River bridges =

Four historic bridges on the Big Thompson River in Larimer County, Colorado survived its flood of 1976, but since have lost most of their historic integrity. They were built in 1933 and 1937. All four were listed on the National Register of Historic Places in 2002, and two were delisted in 2010.

The four bridges:

- Big Thompson River Bridge I, US 34 at milepost 65.53, Estes Park, CO
- Big Thompson River Bridge II, US 34 at milepost 66.22, Estes Park, CO
- Big Thompson River Bridge III, US 34 at milepost 85.15, Loveland, CO
- Big Thompson River Bridge IV, US 34 at milepost 86.04, Loveland, CO

All four were camelback pony truss bridges that were designed by the Colorado Department of Highways and fabricated by Midwest Steel & Iron Works. Bridges III and IV were put together by Lawrence Construction Company in 1933, and bridges I and II were put together by contractor M.E. Carlson four years later.

The bridges were deemed significant for representing transportation and for their preserved structure. Bridges I and II were removed from the National Register on November 29, 2010. Delistings from the NRHP usually occur when a listed building or other structure is demolished or if its historic integrity is otherwise severely compromised. Bridges III and IV have been substantially renovated in place so far that their camelback truss structures are entirely gone, but they currently remain on the Register.

The four bridges were identified as conforming to terms defined for historic bridge notability as defined in a 2000 study.

== Bridge I ==
- Big Thompson River Bridge I Big Thompson River Bridge II
- Formerly listed on the U.S. National Register of Historic Places
- Nearest city: Estes Park, Colorado
- Area: less than one acre
- Built: 1937; 89 years ago
- Architectural style: Camelback pony truss
- MPS: Highway Bridges in Colorado MPS
- NRHP reference No.: 02001144, 02001141

Significant dates
- Added to NRHP: October 15, 2002
- Removed from NRHP: November 29, 2010

The bridge, near Estes Park, had pedestrian sidewalks cantilevered from the outside. 40°22′49″N 105°28′19″W

== Bridge II ==
This bridge was structurally the same as its predecessor bridge. 40°23′22″N 105°27′49″W

== Bridge III ==
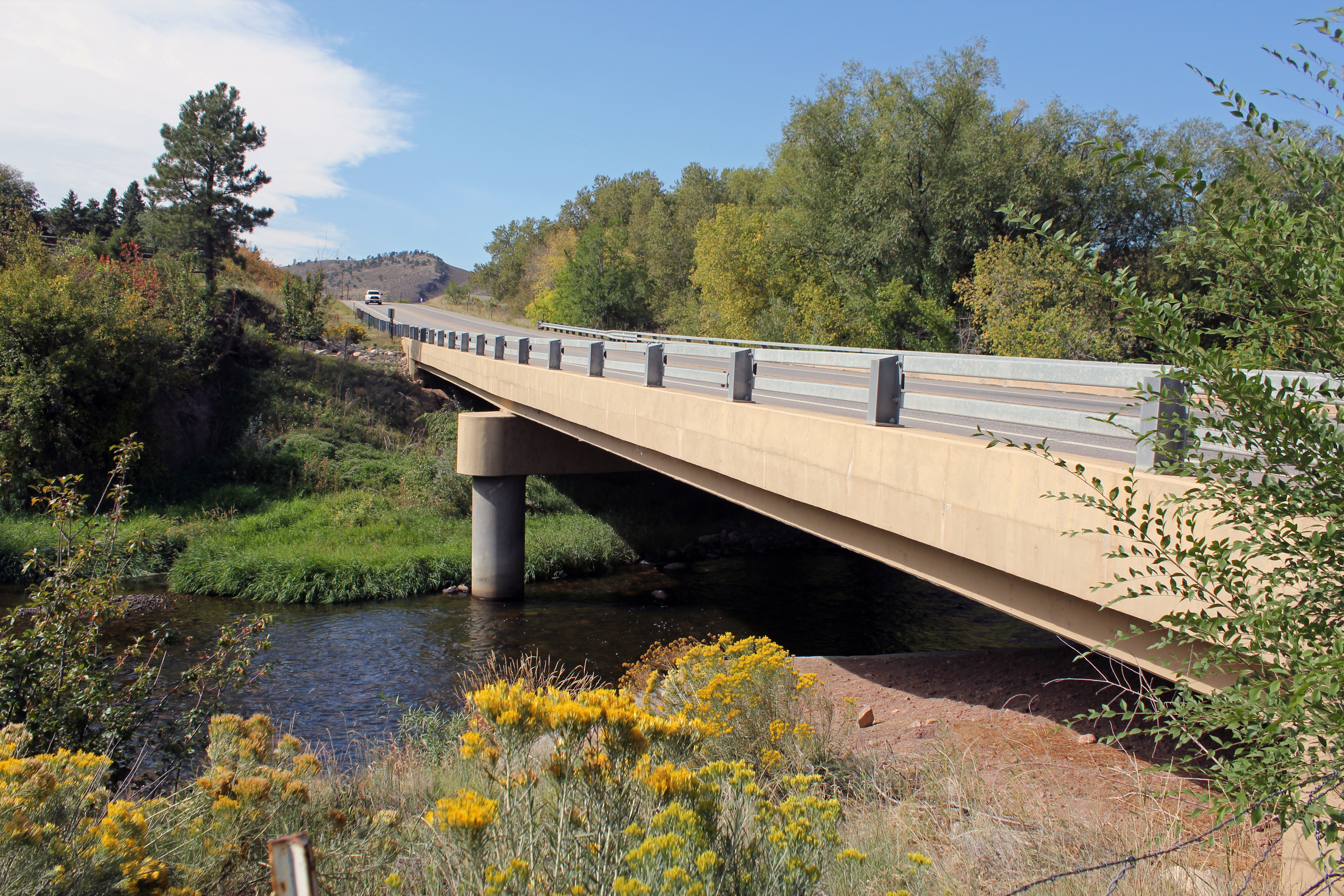
September 2012 photo of modern replacement bridge III lacking the truss structure

- Big Thompson River Bridge III; Big Thompson River Bridge IV
- U.S. National Register of Historic Places
- Location: US 34 at milepost 85.15 (III), US 34 at milepost 86.04 (IV), Loveland, Colorado
- Area: less than one acre (III, IV)
- Built: 1933; 93 years ago
- Architectural style: Camelback pony truss
- MPS: Highway Bridges in Colorado MPS
- NRHP reference No.: 02001139, 02001140
- Added to NRHP: October 15, 2002

The Big Thompson River Bridge III on US 34 at milepost 85.15 in Loveland, Colorado is a historic bridge built in 1933. It was a Camelback pony truss bridge that was designed by the Colorado Department of Highways, fabricated by Midwest Steel & Iron Works and put up by contractor Lawrence Construction Company in 1933. The structure had length 134 feet (41 m) with main span length of 100 ft (30 m). Its superstructure was steel, rigid-connected camelback pony truss and its substructure included concrete abutments, wingwalls and piers. It had a concrete deck with asphalt overlay. The site was modified c.1980 by addition of flex-beam guardrails at approaches.

The bridge was deemed worthy of historic designation largely for its engineering; like the others, it was a rigid-connected camelback pony truss bridge built of steel, and the four bridges represented the state's only surviving cluster of such bridges.

It has been substantially replaced by a non-truss bridge, though the National Register listing has not yet been revoked.

It has been termed a "lost bridge" because the original structure was mostly replaced, as documented in a 2005 photo which showed trusses still in place, but the span supported by a concrete pillar construction which would not have been part of the original bridge.

As of 2012, the pony truss structure is entirely gone, as documented in its 2012 photo. 40°24′54″N 105°11′42″W

== Bridge IV ==
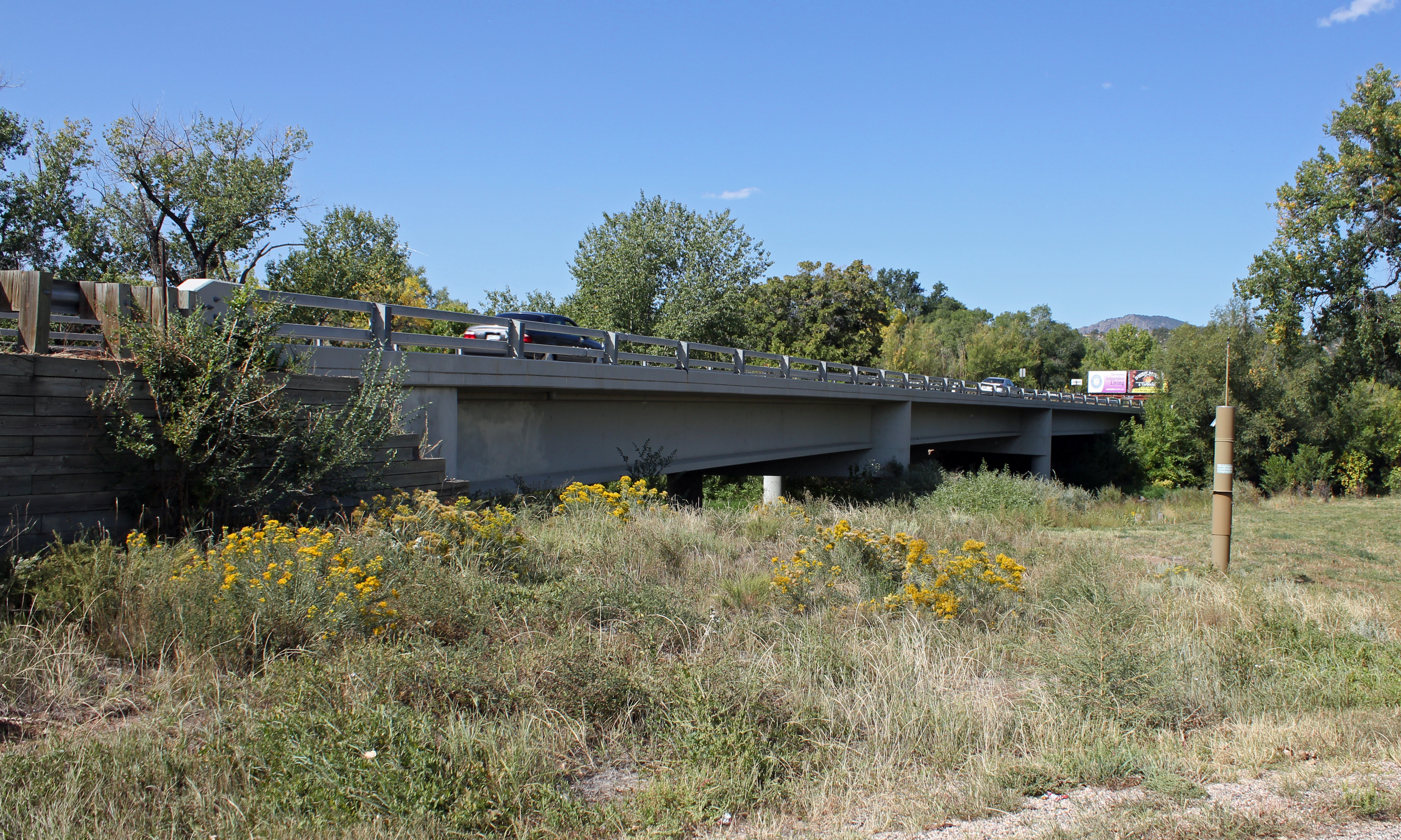
Bridge at site in 2012, with truss structure entirely gone

The Big Thompson River Bridge IV was a historic camelback pony truss bridge that was built in 1933.

A modern bridge is now located at the site; the truss structure is entirely gone as documented in 2012 photo. Though historic integrity is apparently gone, the bridge remains listed on the National Register. 40°25′7″N 105°10′47″W
