= Cherry Creek Bridge =

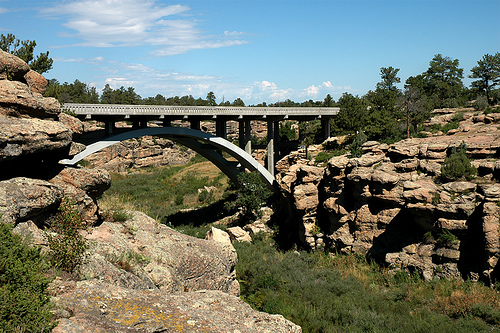
- Coordinates: 39°19′41″N 104°44′3.5″W
- Cherry Creek Bridge
- U.S. National Register of Historic Places
- Colorado State Register of Historic Properties
- Nearest city: Franktown, Colorado
- Area: less than one acre
- Architect: Colorado Department of Highways; Monaghan, J.H.& N.M. & Associates
- Architectural style: Two-rib open-spandrel arch
- MPS: Highway Bridges in Colorado MPS
- NRHP reference No.: 02001147
- CSRHP No.: 5DA.1519
- Added to NRHP: October 15, 2002
- Carries: Passenger vehicles
- Crosses: Cherry Creek
- Locale: near Franktown, Colorado

Characteristics
- Total length: 374 ft (114 m)
- Width: 29.8 ft (9.1 m)
- Longest span: 232 ft (71 m)

History
- Construction end: 1948

Location
- Interactive map of Cherry Creek Bridge

The Cherry Creek Bridge is a concrete arch bridge spanning Cherry Creek near Franktown, Colorado. State Highway 83 runs atop it. It was built in 1948 by J.H.& N.M. Monaghan & Associates and is listed on the National Register of Historic Places. It is located within Castlewood Canyon State Park.

Its design and construction are credited to the Colorado Department of Highways and J.H.& N.M. & Associates.

It was a post-war exception to the practice of using lighter concrete bridge designs in the state.

== See also ==
- National Register of Historic Places listings in Douglas County, Colorado
