= Castlewood Canyon State Park =

State park in Colorado, United States

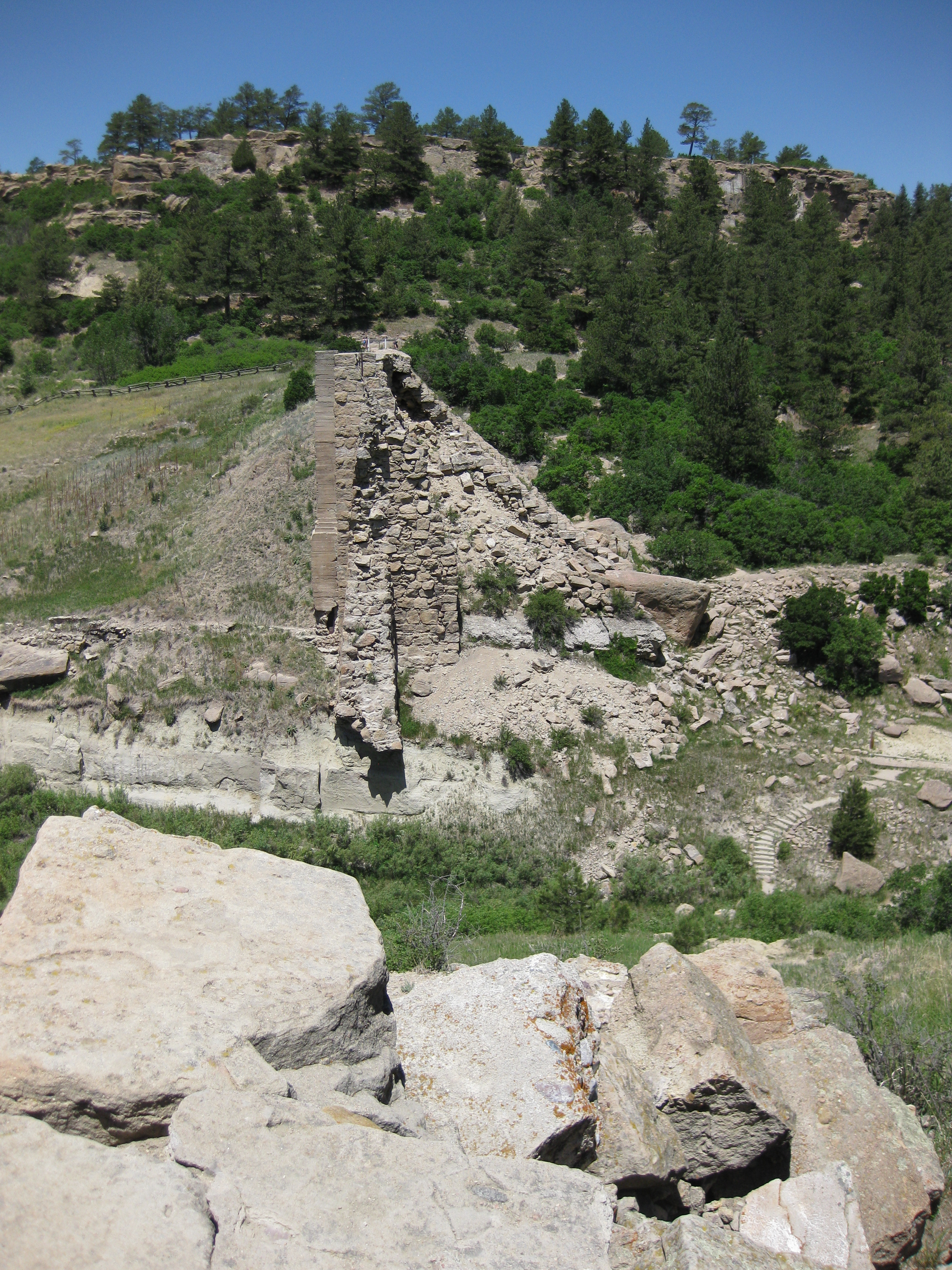
- Remnants of Castlewood Dam

- Location within Colorado
- Location: Douglas County, Colorado, USA
- Nearest city: Castle Rock, Colorado
- Coordinates: 39°19′47″N 104°44′19″W
- Area: 2,621 acres (10.61 km^{2})
- Established: 1964
- Visitors: 252,422 (in 2021)
- Governing body: Colorado Parks and Wildlife
- Website: https://cpw.state.co.us/state-parks/castlewood-canyon-state-park

Castlewood Canyon State Park is a Colorado state park near Franktown, Colorado. The park retains a unique part of Colorado's history, the remains of Castlewood Canyon Dam. Visitors can still see the remnants and damage from that dam which burst in 1933. The event sent a 15-foot (5 m) wave of water all the way to downtown Denver resulting in a flood. Also contained within the park is the historic Cherry Creek Bridge.

== Recreation ==
This park hosts a multitude of hiking/running trails, handicapped access trails and rock climbing opportunities, as well as a nature preservation area on the eastern side that is home to wildlife and interesting geological features. Located within the northernmost extension of the Black Forest, Castle Wood Canyon encompasses 2,136 acres (9 km^{2}) with elevations ranging from 6,200 to 6,600 feet (2,010 m). Many urban dwellers come for the picnic opportunity away from the city (group picnic facilities can be reserved), others visit the park because of the unusual geology, particularly the caprock features.

== Wildlife, ecology, and geography ==
Among the many species living in the park are coyote, cottontail rabbit, red fox, black bear, mule deer, prairie rattlesnake, mountain lion, meadow jumping mouse, turkey vulture, golden eagle, prairie falcon, virile crayfish, Woodhouse's toad and the northern leopard frog.

Ecosystem Zones in the park are grasslands, shrublands, riparian, foothills-conifer, and caprock.

Castlewood Canyon is on the edge of the Palmer Divide, a geologically upraised area that results in more moisture falling than is normal in eastern Colorado, watering the Black Forest.

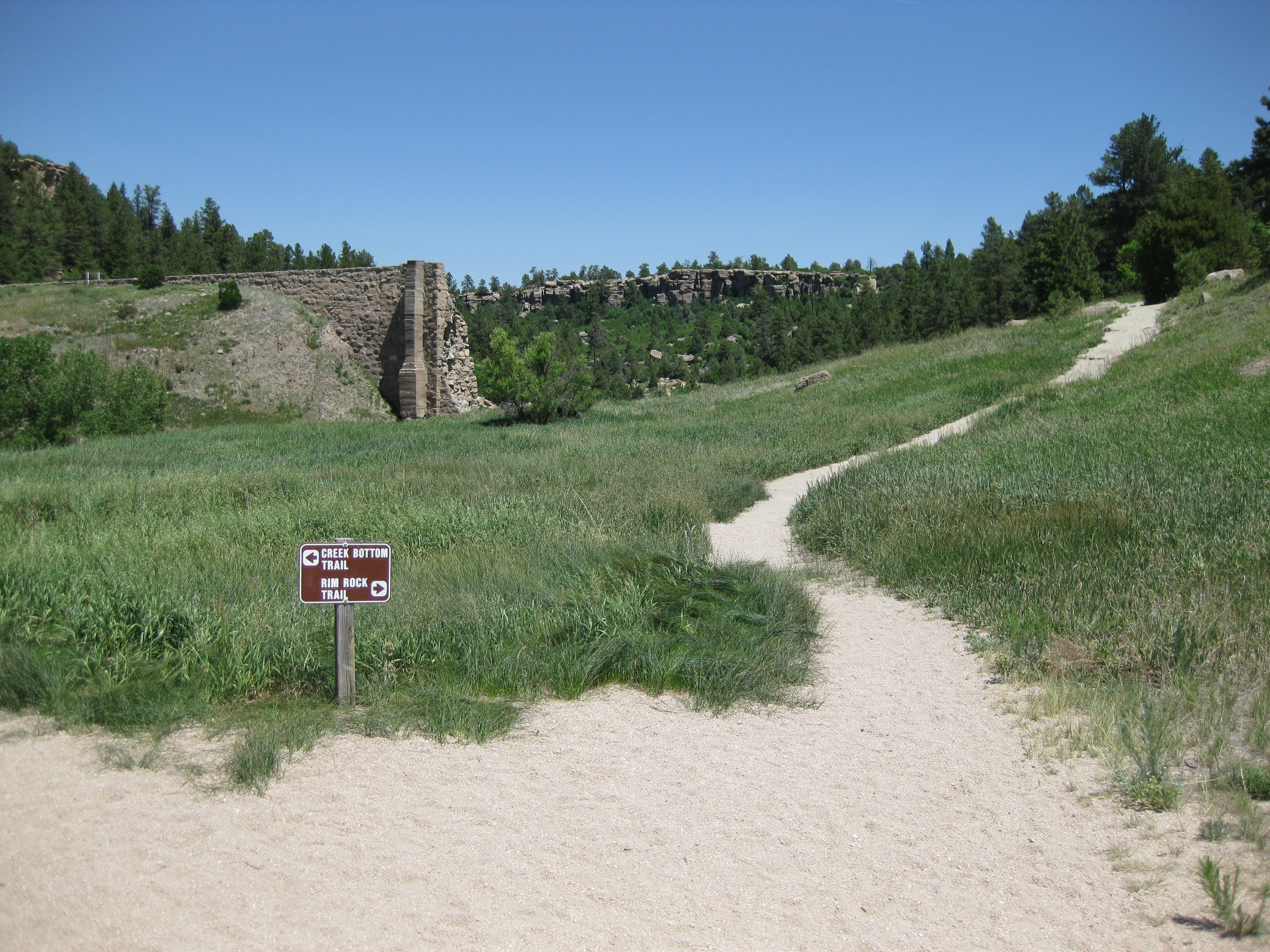
Castlewood Dam Trails

== History ==
The Cherry Creek Rockshelter archeological site is located within the park.

The Castlewood Dam in Castlewood Canyon, built in 1890, suffered an utter collapse following heavy rains at 1 am on 3 August 1933, resulting in a 15-foot wall of water rushing down Cherry Creek to Denver, some 15 miles away. Warnings to the city by 4 am allowed most people to move out of the way of the flood waters.

Castlewood State Park was formed in 1964, following an 87-acre land purchase in 1961 and an additional 792-acre purchase in the late 1970s.
