= West Plum Bush Creek Bridge =

- U.S. National Register of Historic Places
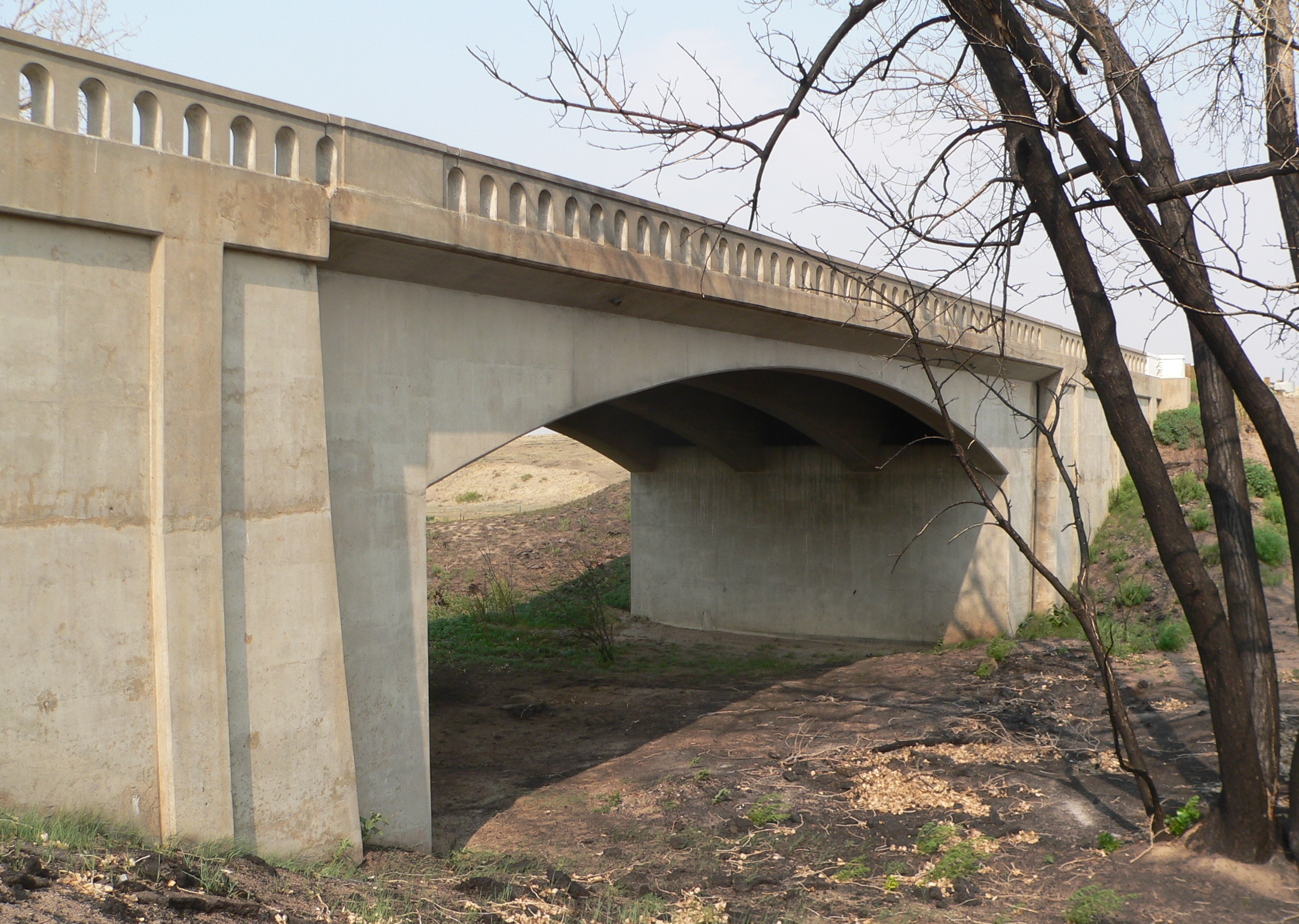

- Location within Colorado Location within the United States
- Nearest city: US 36, Last Chance
- Coordinates: 39°44′23″N 103°36′40″W
- Area: less than one acre
- Built by: Peter Kiewit Sons Construction Co.
- Architect: Colorado Department of Highways
- Architectural style: Concrete rigid frame
- MPS: Highway Bridges in Colorado MPS
- NRHP reference No.: 02001136
- Added to NRHP: October 15, 2002

The West Plum Bush Creek Bridge, near Last Chance, Colorado, is a historic concrete rigid frame bridge that is listed on the National Register of Historic Places. Like the similar Plum Bush Creek Bridge less than four miles away, it brings U.S. Highway 36 across the Plum Bush Creek. It was designed by the Colorado Department of Highways and built by Peter Kiewit Sons Construction Co. It was listed on the National Register of Historic Places in 2002.

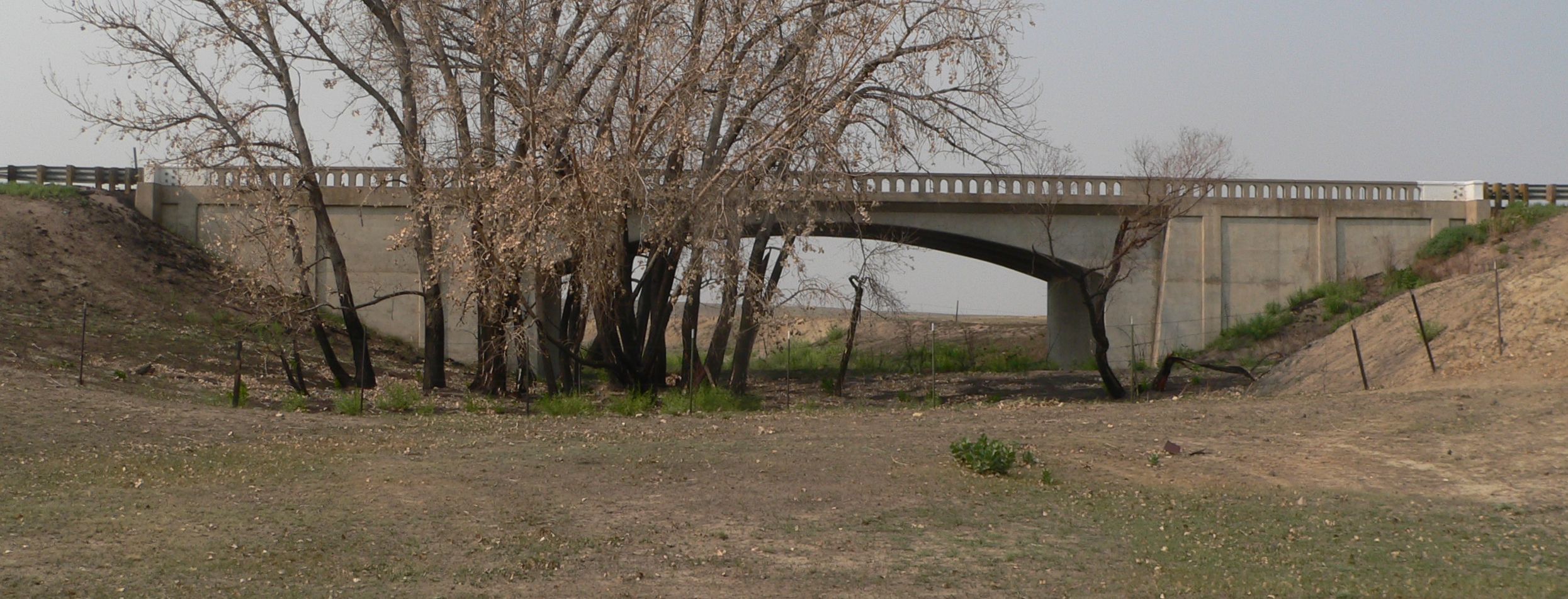

It was deemed significant as a good example and a rare surviving example of its type, in its area.
