= Plum Bush Creek Bridge =

- U.S. National Register of Historic Places
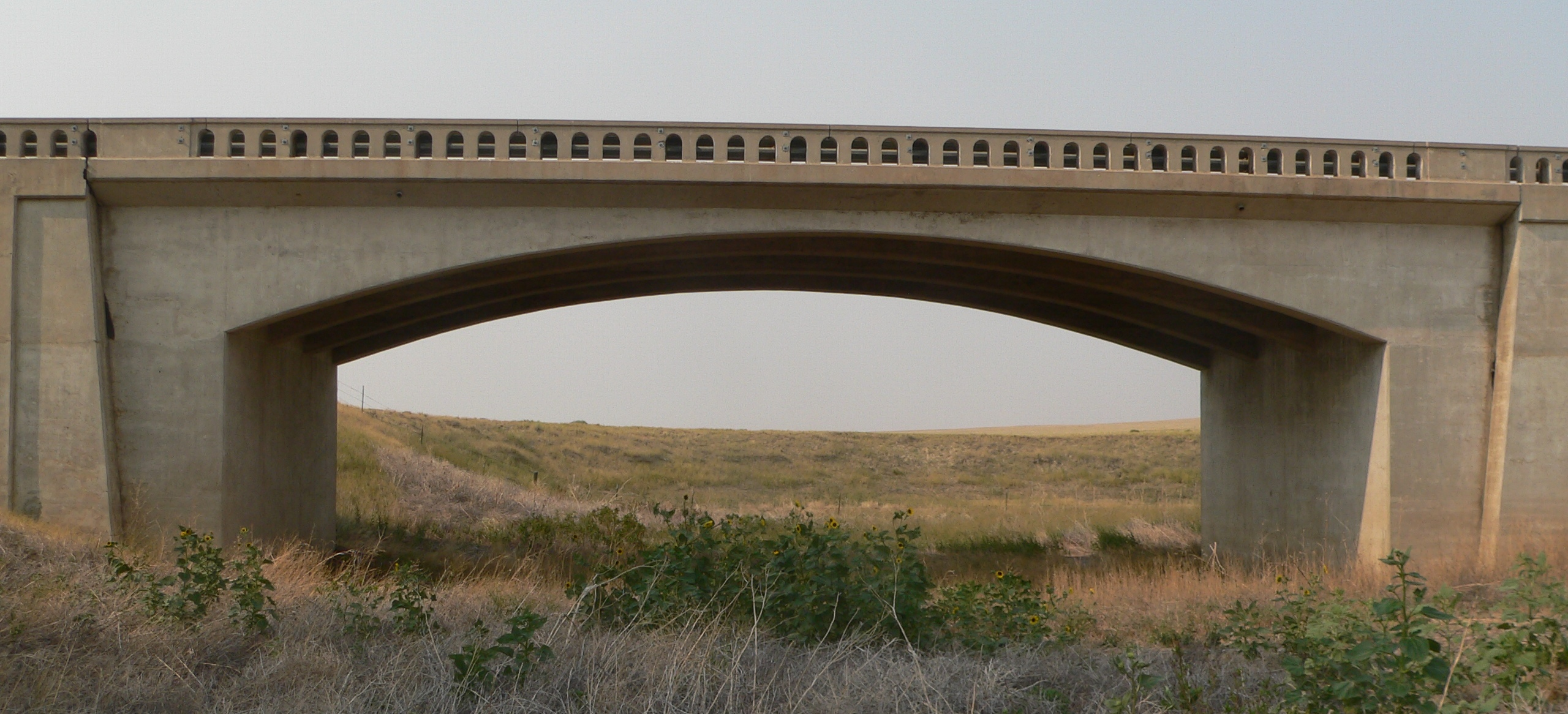

- Location within Colorado Location within the United States
- Location: US 36 at milepost 138.16, Last Chance, Colorado
- Coordinates: 39°44′24″N 103°32′46″W
- Area: less than one acre
- Built: 1938
- Built by: Peter Kiewit Sons Construction Co.
- Architect: Colorado Department of Highways
- Architectural style: Concrete rigid frame
- MPS: Highway Bridges in Colorado MPS
- NRHP reference No.: 02001135
- Added to NRHP: October 15, 2002

The Plum Bush Creek Bridge, near Last Chance, Colorado, is a concrete rigid frame bridge that is listed on the National Register of Historic Places. It brings US 36 across Plum Bush Creek and is located at milepost 138.16 of US 36. It was designed by Colorado Department of Highways and built by Peter Kiewit Sons Construction Co. in 1938. It was listed on the National Register of Historic Places (NRHP) in 2002.

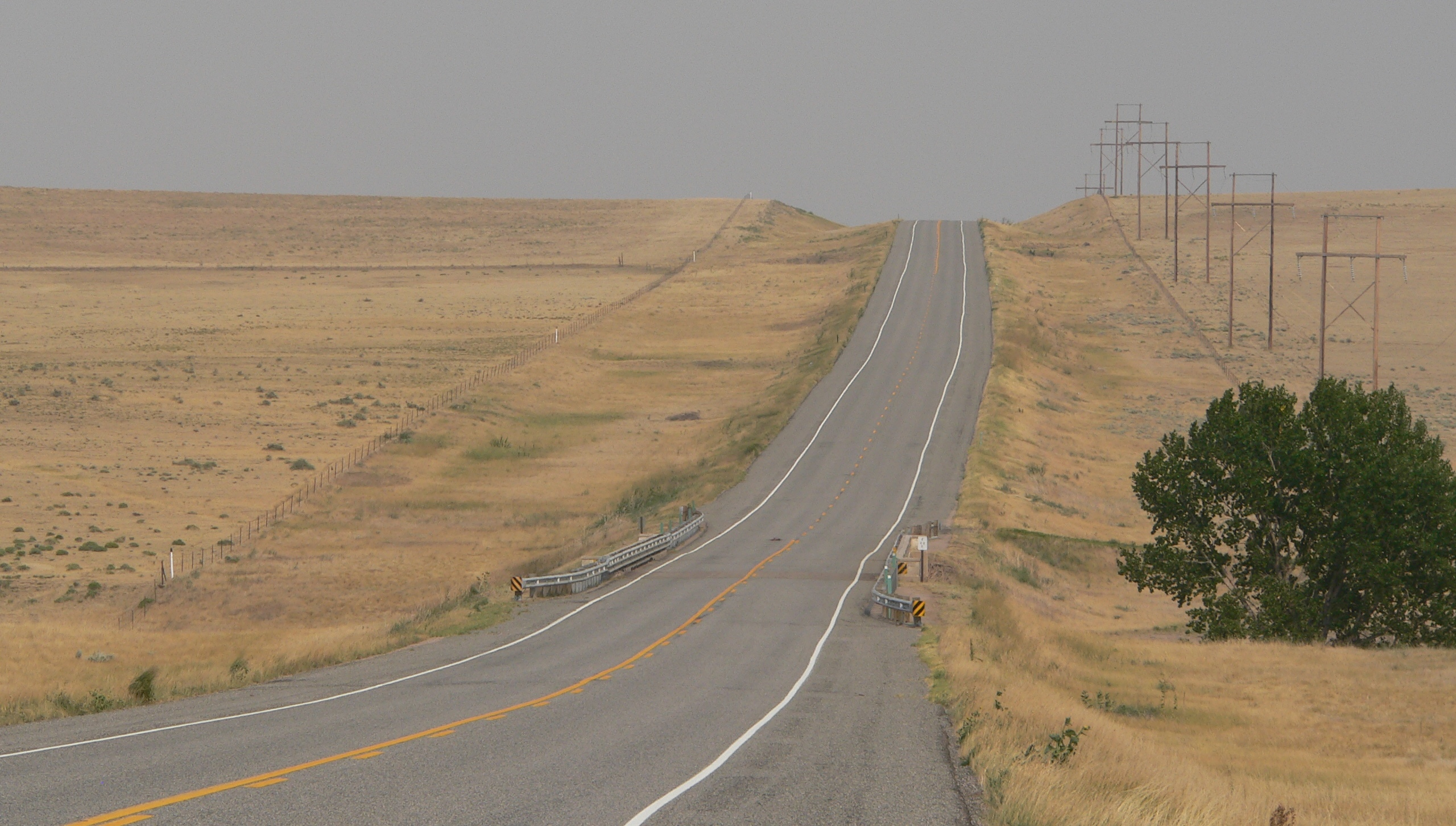

The bridge is significant as a "rare surviving example" of a concrete rigid frame bridge in rural Colorado. It is located in an area of open high plains grasslands.

== See also ==
- West Plum Bush Creek Bridge, nearby, also NRHP-listed
