= Bridge over Arkansas River =

Historic bridge in Johnson Village, Colorado, United States

- U.S. National Register of Historic Places
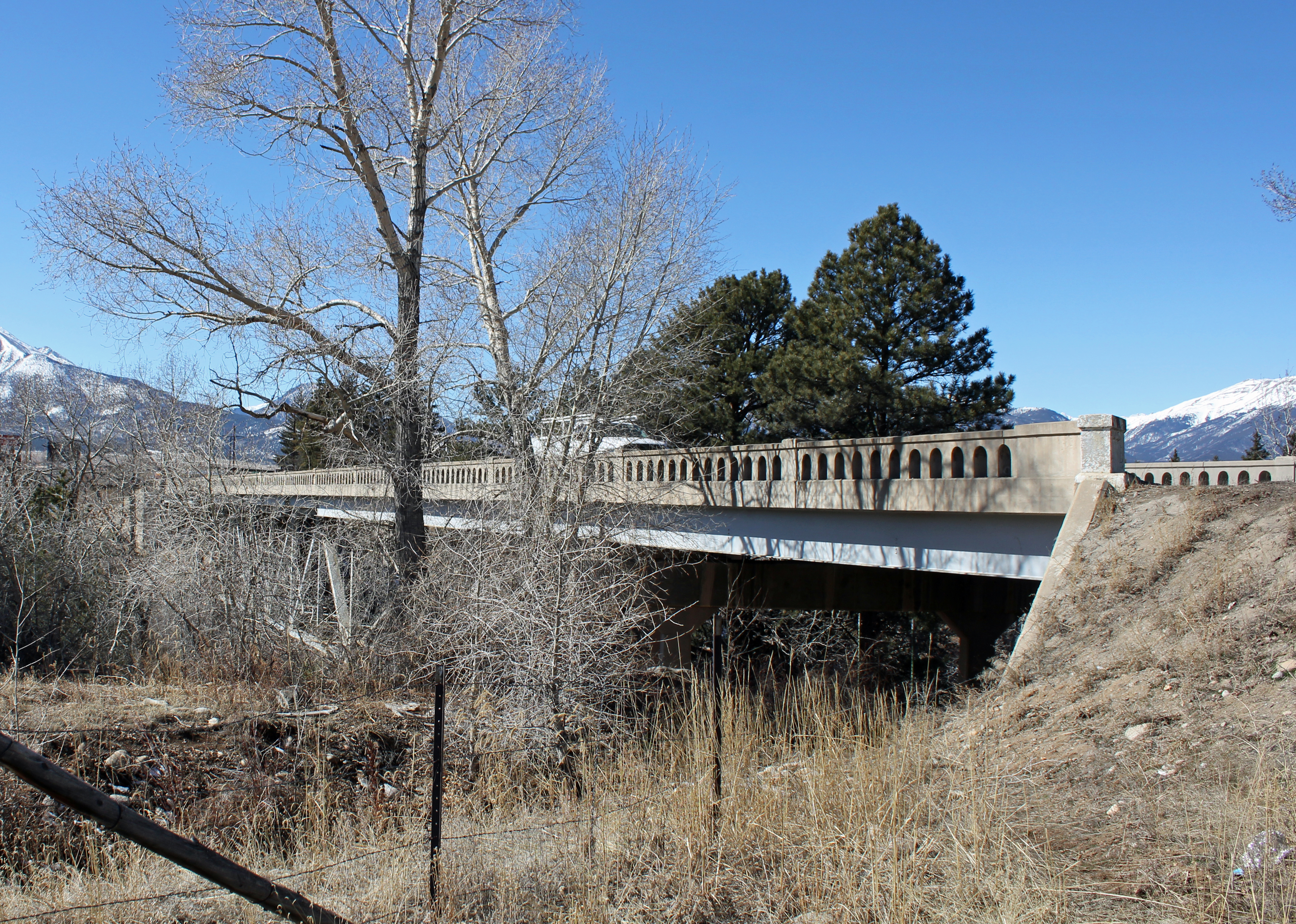
- Bridge in 2016; the river is far below central truss of the bridge

- Location within Colorado
- Nearest city: Buena Vista, Colorado
- Coordinates: 38°48′49″N 106°06′12″W
- Area: 0.3 acres (0.12 ha)
- Built: 1937
- Built by: M.E. Carlson
- Architect: Colorado Department of Highways
- Architectural style: Pratt Deck Truss
- MPS: Vehicular Bridges in Colorado TR
- NRHP reference No.: 85000190
- Added to NRHP: February 4, 1985

The Bridge over Arkansas River in Johnson Village, Colorado, near Buena Vista, is a Pratt deck truss bridge built in 1937. It was listed on the National Register of Historic Places in 1985.

It is a "visually impressive" 353-foot-long (108 m) bridge, carrying a 30-foot (9.1 m) roadway on a skewed line high over the Arkansas River. It was designed by the Colorado Department of Highways and was built by contractor M.E. Carlson.

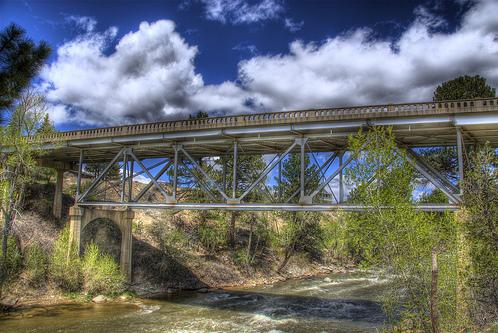
the Pratt truss

The bridge carries U.S. Highway 24 over the Arkansas River. Its Pratt truss span is 125 feet (38 m) long.
