= Granada Bridge (Granada, Colorado) =

- U.S. National Register of Historic Places
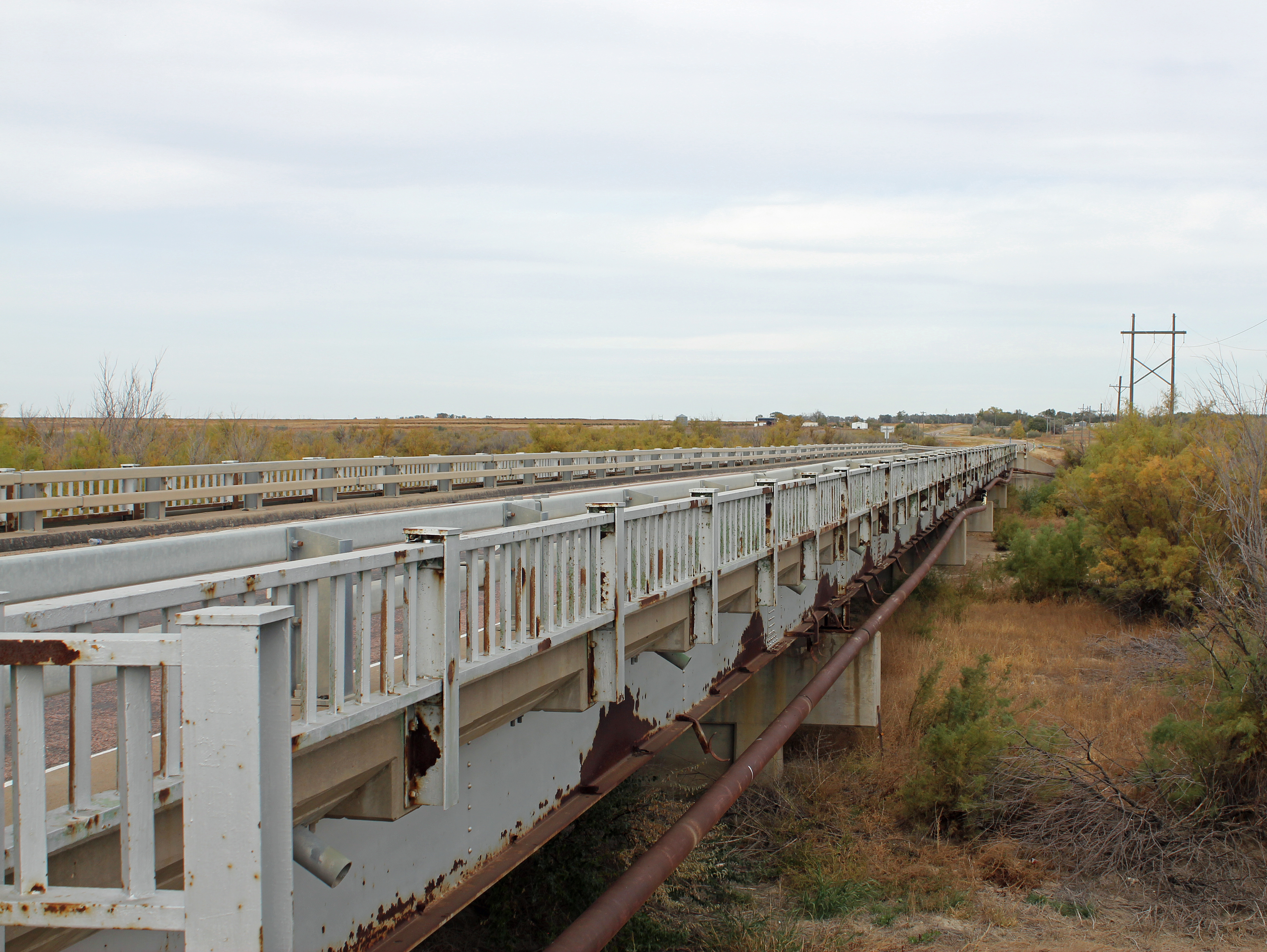

- Location within Colorado Location within the United States
- Location: US 385 at milepost 97.32, Granada, Colorado
- Coordinates: 38°05′38″N 102°18′37″W
- Area: less than one acre
- Built by: C.L. Hubner Company; Burkhardt Steel Company
- Architect: Colorado Department of Highways
- Architectural style: Steel I-beam stringer
- MPS: Highway Bridges in Colorado MPS
- NRHP reference No.: 02001138
- Added to NRHP: October 15, 2002

The Granada Bridge, on U.S. Route 385 (US 385) at milepost 97.32 in or near Granada, Colorado. It was listed on the National Register of Historic Places in 2002.

It is a steel stringer bridge. The contract was let by Colorado Department of Highways in 1949 to replace an older bridge at the same location. The builder was the C.L. Hubner Company, with subcontractor Burkhardt Steel fabricating the steel superstructure.
