= Midwest Steel & Iron Works =

- Midwest Steel and Iron Works Company Complex
- U.S. National Register of Historic Places
- Colorado State Register of Historic Properties
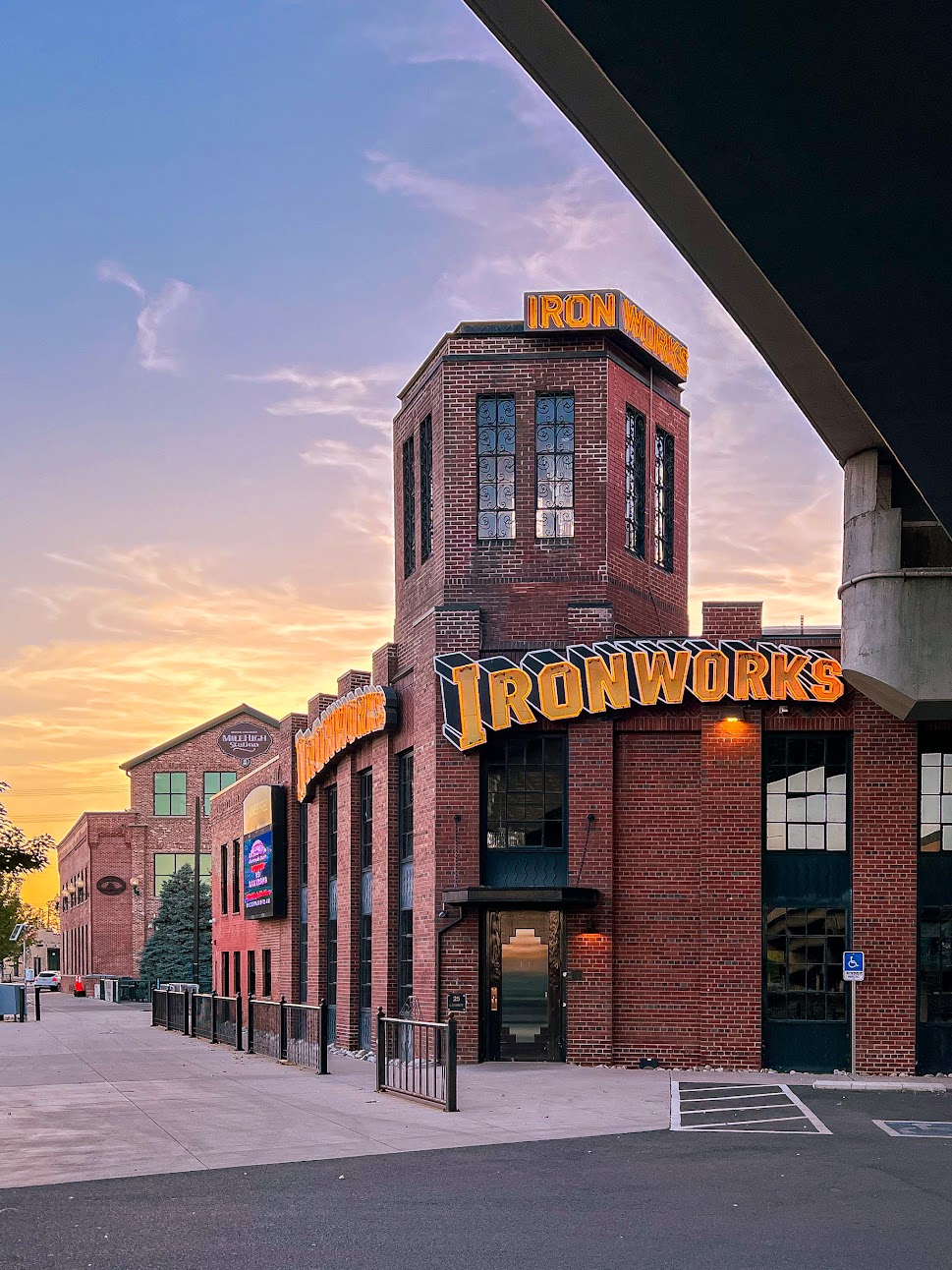
- Office building of Midwest Steel and Iron; the president's office was in the tower room.

- Location within Colorado Location within the United States
- Location: 25 Larimer St., Denver, Colorado
- Coordinates: 39°44′27″N 105°0′55″W
- Area: 2 acres (0.81 ha)
- Built: 1906, 1911, 1923, 1930, 1952, 1955, 1967
- Architect: Roland Linder
- Architectural style: Art Deco, Commercial Vernacular
- NRHP reference No.: 85000858
- CSRHP No.: 5DV.339
- Added to NRHP: April 10, 1985

Midwest Steel & Iron Works was a metal fabrication company based in Denver, Colorado. Founded in 1893, the company was known for a time as the Jackson-Richter Iron Works. The company was one of the oldest and largest metal fabricators in Denver. The company built both structural and ornamental components for structures throughout Colorado, Wyoming, and New Mexico. The company's headquarters on Larimer Street in Denver includes an Art Deco office building and consists of a four-building complex that is itself considered a historic industrial site. The complex served as the company's headquarters from 1923 to 1983.

Among other works, the company manufactured the four Big Thompson River bridges in Estes Park and Loveland, Colorado, all of which are listed on the National Register of Historic Places.

== History ==
The office building was built in 1906 and expanded in 1930 and in 1955. The 1930 addition was a two-story Art Deco style brick 72 feet (22 m) by 35 feet (11 m) building designed by Denver architect Roland L. Linder.

The shop building was built in 1911 and expanded in 1923, 1952, and 1967. While most of the firm's early machinery no longer exists, the shop contains an original rivet forge from circa 1925.

The complex was listed on the National Register of Historic Places in 1985. The listing included two contributing buildings on 2 acres (0.81 ha).

In 2018, following a period of renovations, the building was reopened as a private event space.
