= Cottonwood Creek Bridge (Colorado Springs, Colorado) =

- U.S. National Register of Historic Places
- Colorado State Register of Historic Properties No. 5EP.972
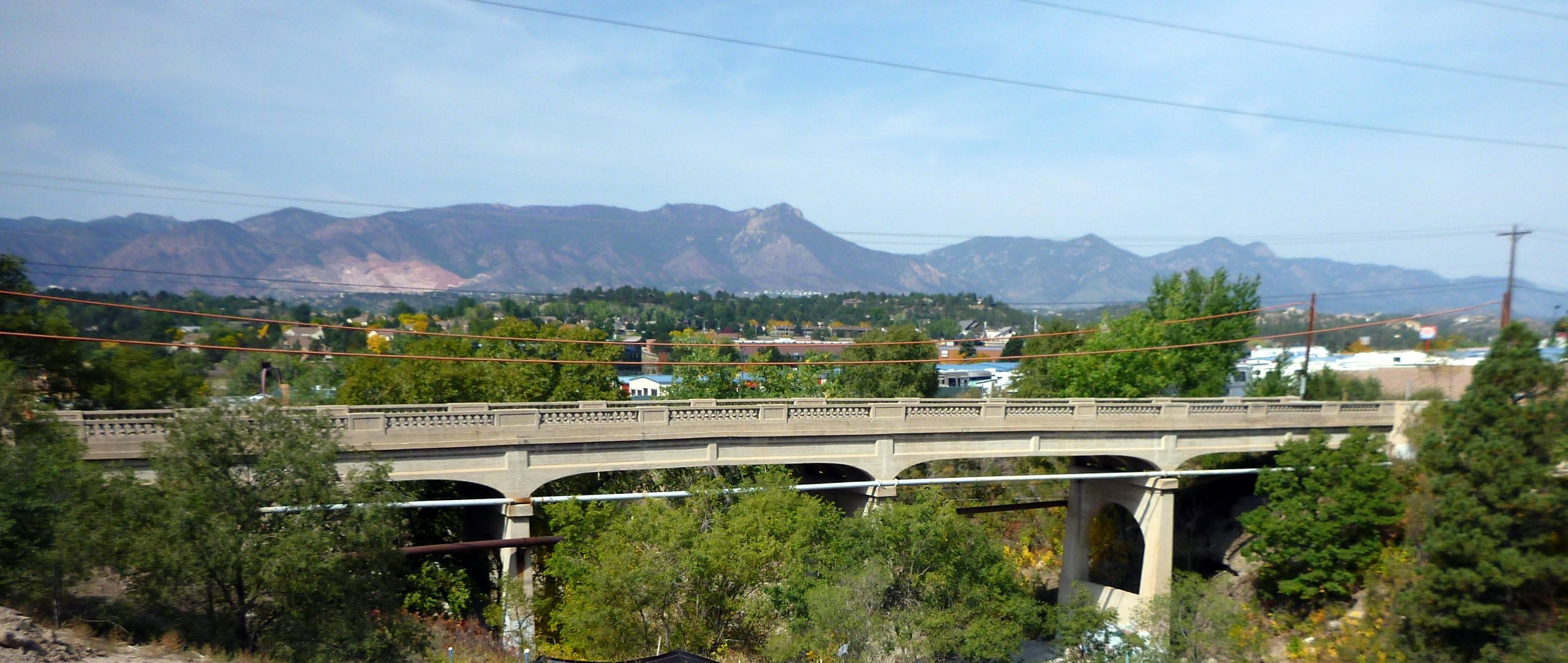

- Location within Colorado Location within the United States
- Location: Vincent Street over Cottonwood Creek, Colorado Springs, Colorado
- Coordinates: 38°55′43″N 104°48′35″W
- NRHP reference No.: 01001104
- CSRHP No.: 5EP.972

Significant dates
- Added to NRHP: October 12, 2001
- Designated CSRHP: October 12, 2001

The Cottonwood Creek Bridge is a bridge over Cottonwood Creek in Colorado Springs, Colorado. The structure is on the National Register of Historic Places.

The bridge was completed on what was a major Colorado north–south road in 1923 and is one of the few long cantilevered, girder bridges in the state from the 1920s. It has a concrete deck and is made of four 53-foot spans. It is made with a "hammered concrete treatment on the spandrels and cast concrete balusters forming the guardrails."
