= Black Squirrel Creek Bridge =

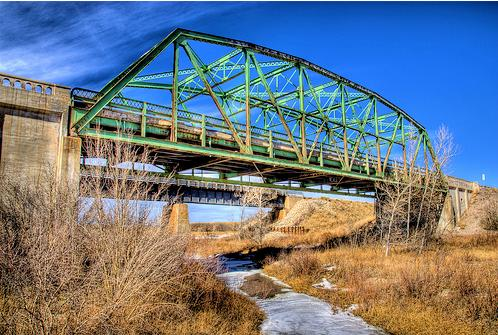
- Bridge in 2008
- Coordinates: 39°00′14″N 104°30′47″W
- Carries: US 24
- Locale: Between Falcon and Peyton, Colorado; U.S. 24 milepost 327.33

Characteristics
- Design: Truss bridge
- Total length: 226 feet (69 m)
- Width: 31.1 feet (9.5 m) (structure); 30 feet (9.1 m) (roadway)
- Longest span: 150 feet (46 m)

History
- Constructed by: Charles B. Owen; A. S. Horner
- Fabrication by: Minneapolis-Moline Power Implement Company
- Construction end: 1935
- Closed: 2012

Statistics
- Daily traffic: 6500–8500 (circa 2011)
- Black Squirrel Creek Bridge
- U.S. National Register of Historic Places
- Colorado State Register of Historic Properties
- Location within Colorado Location within the United States
- Coordinates: 39°00′15″N 104°30′47″W
- Architect: Colorado Department of Highways
- MPS: Highway Bridges of Colorado MPS
- NRHP reference No.: 02001158
- CSRHP No.: 5EP.3561
- Added to NRHP: October 15, 2002

Location
- Interactive map of Black Squirrel Creek Bridge

The Black Squirrel Creek Bridge carries U.S. 24 over Black Squirrel Creek in El Paso County, Colorado. Prior to 2012, it was locally known as the "green bridge" or "old green bridge"—a historic single-span, Parker through truss bridge that was completed in 1935 and listed on the National Register of Historic Places in 2002. Because it no longer met highway safety standards, the bridge was dismantled and replaced by a newer span in 2012.

== History ==
In the 1930s, the road in El Paso County (which would become U.S. 24) underwent major reconstruction, including the addition of several new bridges. The bridge at Black Squirrel Creek was contracted to Charles B. Owen and A. S. Horner. The truss was built by the Minneapolis-Moline Power Implement Company, and construction of the bridge was complete in 1935. The bridge's concrete abutments are hollow, each with a pair of barred "windows". According to a bridge foreman for El Paso County, the "windows" allowed the removal of formwork once they cured, and the bars were put in place to keep people out. However, the barred "windows" led to tales of uncertain authenticity that a chain gang or German prisoners of World War II were locked up in the abutments, which resemble prison cells.

The bridge was nominated for inclusion on the National Register of Historic Places for its significance in transportation and engineering under Criteria A and C, respectively. At the time of its nomination in 2002, the Black Squirrel Creek Bridge was one of eight Parker through trusses to survive in use on Colorado's highways. The bridge was listed on the National Register on October 15, 2002.

In 2008, twelve state-owned bridges in the county, including the Black Squirrel Creek Bridge, were rated in "poor" condition for failing to meet modern safety standards. The shoulders were only 2 feet (0.61 m) wide and the vertical clearance of 15 feet (4.6 m) was 9 inches (23 cm) short of the then-current minimum, making the bridge potentially hazardous. As part of CDOT's Adopt-A-Bridge program, the agency would have dismantled the bridge and given it to a group willing to take the structure, for such purpose as a pedestrian or bicycle route. A county engineer said of the bridge in 2011 that "we have no use for a structure like that — it's obsolete... All you could do is some type of display, and the cost doesn't seem to justify the benefit."

Since no one took the offer of the bridge, a replacement project began in November 2011, estimated to last about one year. A two-lane paved detour bridge was first built to bypass the bridge. Traffic continued to flow on the bridge until the detour opened in January 2012. Crews then proceeded to remove the old span, build its replacement, repave, build new guardrails, and add seed and mulch. The project finished in August 2012 at a cost of about $3.5 million. The new bridge has a low profile, and the design incorporated the 1934 plaque from the original structure.

== Design ==
The bridge was a standard truss design by the Colorado Highway Department, several of which were built from 1922 to 1945. The single span was a 150-foot-long (46 m) Parker through truss, subdivided into eight panels. The bridge was supported at the four corners on cast steel bearing shoes, with one end fixed and the other able to rock. These were bolted to large concrete abutments with an "unusual" U-shaped wingwall design.

== See also ==
- National Register of Historic Places listings in El Paso County, Colorado
- List of bridges on the National Register of Historic Places in Colorado
- List of Colorado Department of Highways bridges on the National Register of Historic Places
