= Cherry Creek State Park =

State park In Colorado, United States

- Location within Colorado
- Location: Arapahoe County, Colorado, U.S.
- Nearest city: Aurora
- Coordinates: 39°37′50″N 104°50′45″W
- Area: 3,346 acres (13.54 km^{2})
- Established: 1959
- Visitors: 2,685,860 (in 2021)
- Governing body: Colorado Parks and Wildlife

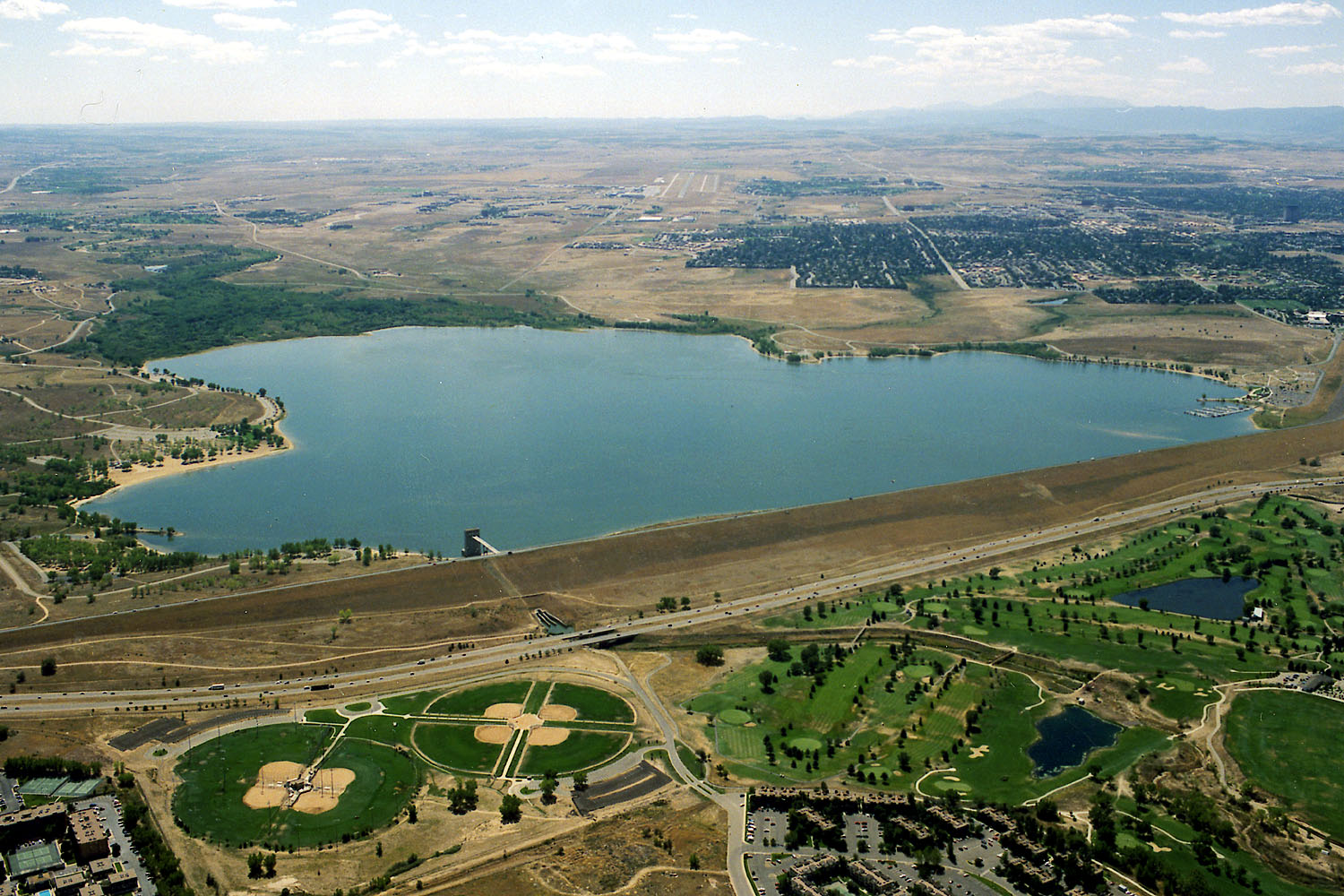
Cherry Creek Dam and reservoir. View is to the south.

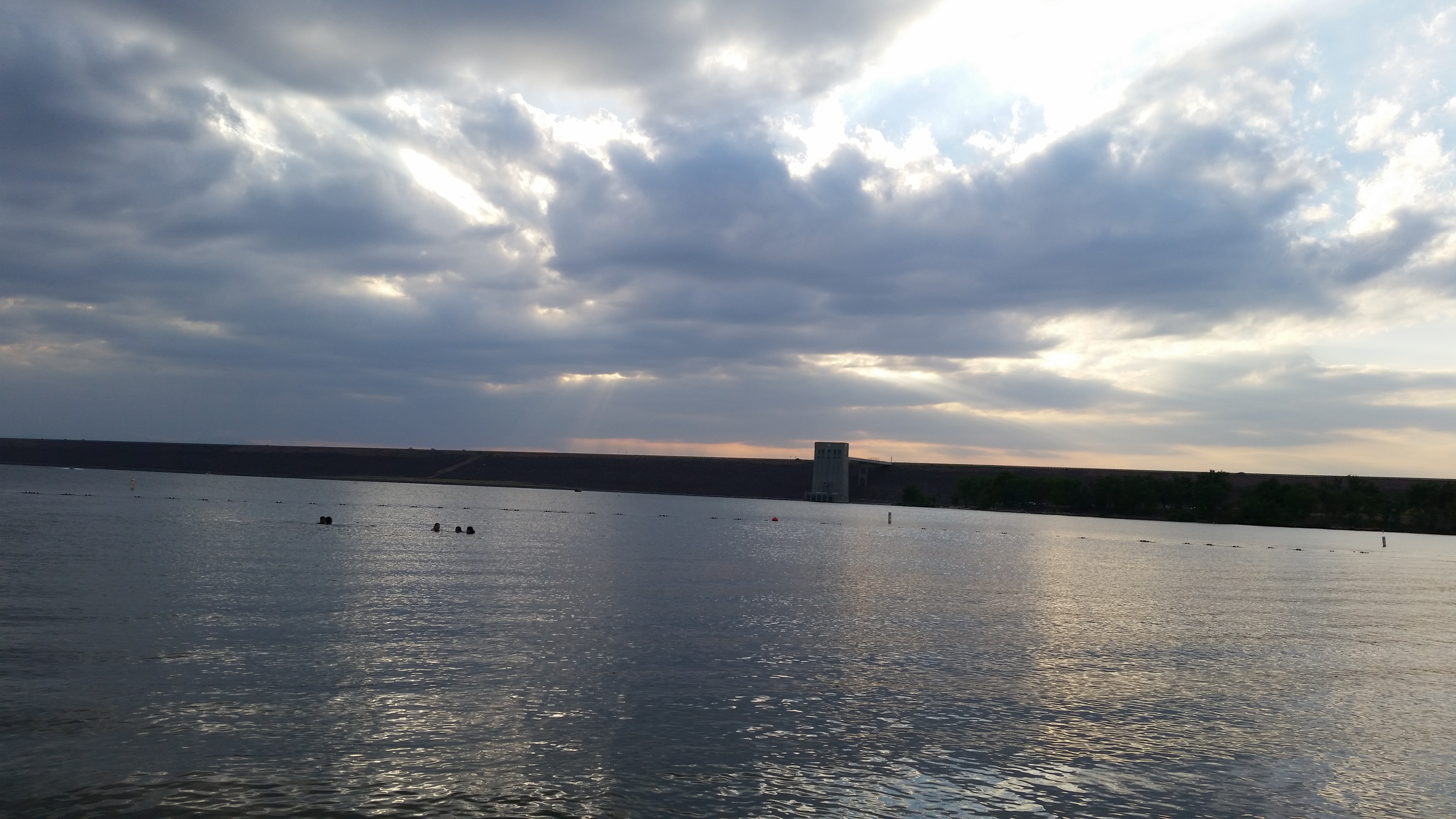
Dam wall

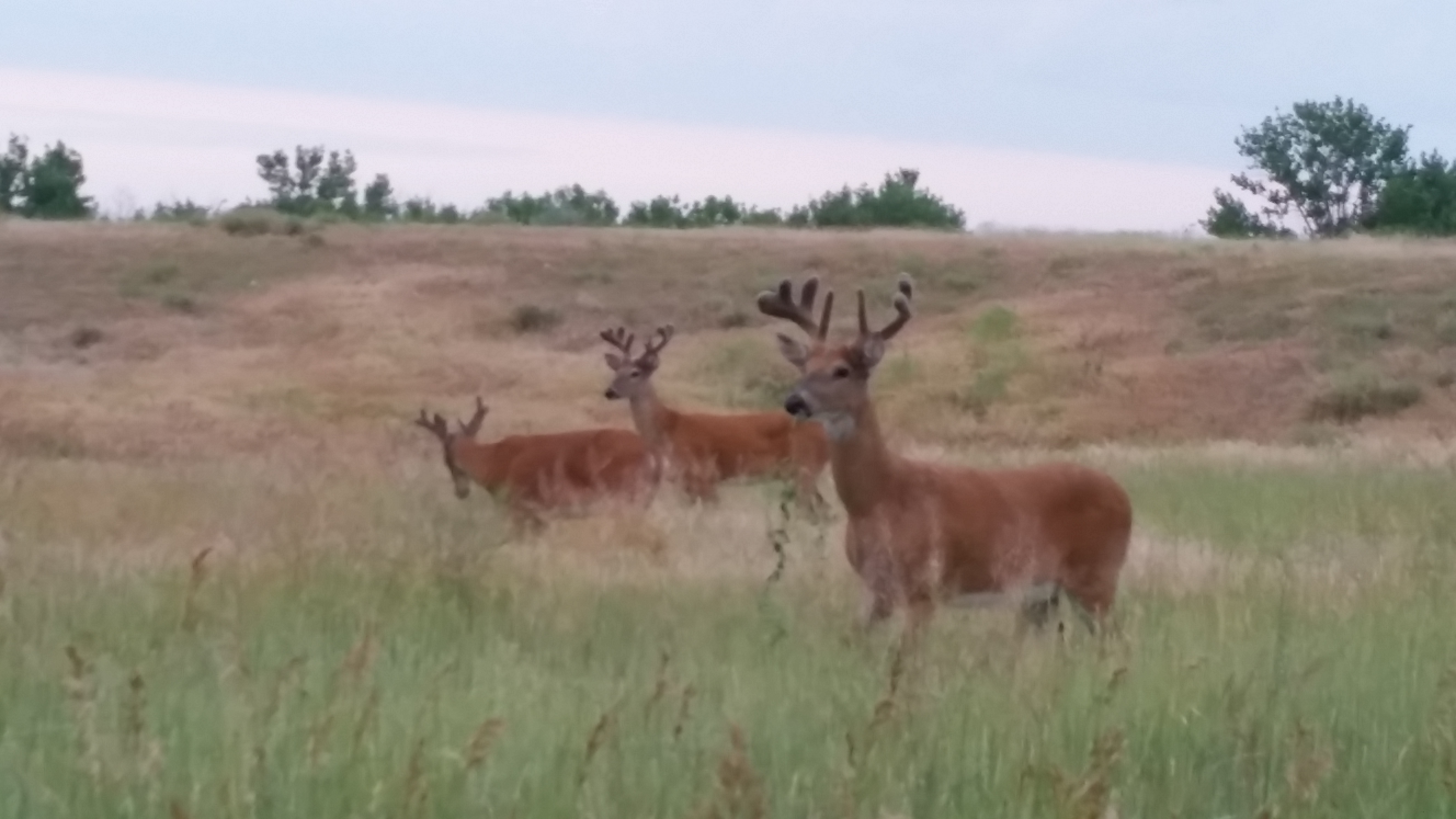
Wildlife in state park

Cherry Creek State Park is a state park in Arapahoe County, Colorado, United States. The park consists of a natural prairie and wetland environment with an 880-acre (3.6 km^{2}) reservoir at its center which is shared by powerboats, sailboats, and paddle craft. An imported-sand swim beach is situated on the north-eastern side along with ample parking. The park has 12 miles (19 km) of paved roads and 35 miles (56 km) of multi-use trails open to runners, cyclists, and horseback riders. There are facilities for camping, radio-controlled aircraft, picnicking, as well as opportunities for bird watching, cross country skiing, and fishing. The park also contains an outdoor shooting range. There is a dock where people can store their boats during the summer. People can also rent jet skis, paddle boards and kayaks for the day. There is a boat house that has concerts during the summer, serves food and has a bar.

== Wildlife ==
More than 40 mammal species roam through the park, including eastern cottontail rabbit, coyote, beaver, muskrat, raccoon, weasel, ground squirrel, mule deer, white-tailed deer, and scampering black-tailed prairie dogs.

== History ==
On August 15, 1993, Cherry Creek State Park was the location for the papal mass of the 8th World Youth Day with Pope John Paul II. The event brought an estimated 500,000 people to the site.
