= Lost Man Lake =

Lake in Pitkin County, Colorado

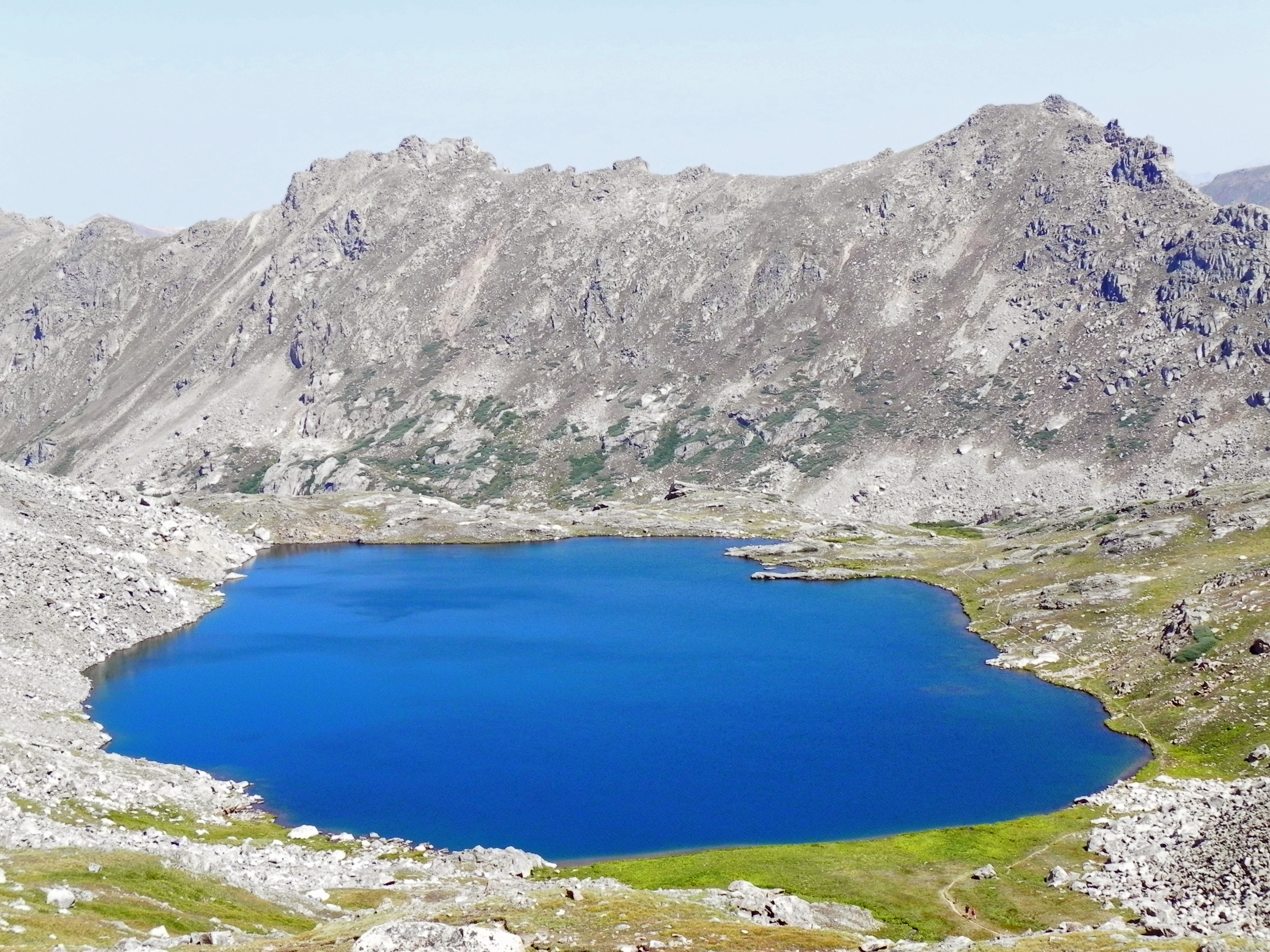
- Lost Man Lake

- Location within Colorado Location within the United States
- Location: Pitkin County, Colorado, United States
- Coordinates: 39.153537°N 106.569056°W
- Type: Glacial
- Primary outflows: Lost Man Creek
- Basin countries: United States
- Max. length: 0.23 mi (0.37 km)
- Max. width: 0.13 mi (0.21 km)
- Surface elevation: 12,457 ft (3,797 m)

Lost Man Lake is an alpine lake in Pitkin County, Colorado, United States, located high in the Sawatch Range in the Hunter-Fryingpan Wilderness of White River National Forest. The lake is accessible via the Lost Man Loop Trail from State Highway 82 west of Independence Pass. The lake is over a pass and north of Independence Lake and northeast of Geissler Mountain. Lost Man Lake is larger than Independence, but only its east side is open. The trail continues by the lake into high alpine meadows in the upper valley, and to its west terminus at Lost Man Campground. Views down Lost Man Creek valley are worth a look, and a great place to scan high slopes and ridges for mountain goats, bighorn sheep and elk.

It is a moderate half day hike. Depending on snowpack and weather, the lake may still be frozen in July.
