= Twining Peak =

Mountain in the American state of Colorado

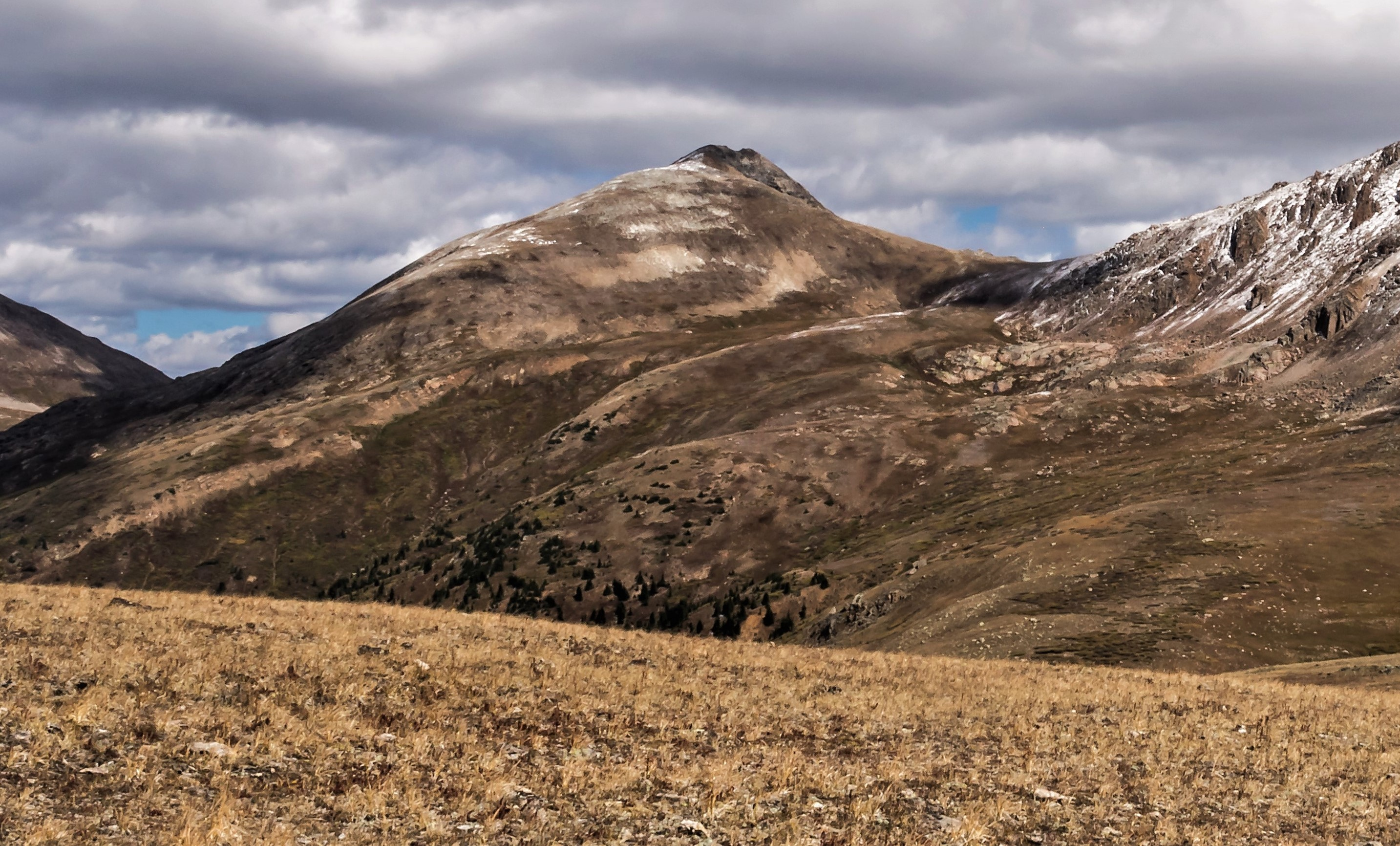
- South aspect

Highest point
- Elevation: 13,711 ft (4,179 m)
- Prominence: 1,231 ft (375 m)
- Parent peak: Deer Mountain (13,763 ft)
- Isolation: 2.15 mi (3.46 km)
- Coordinates: 39°08′05″N 106°33′48″W

Naming
- Etymology: Dr. Warren Hugh Twining

Geography
- Location within Colorado Location within the United States
- Country: United States
- State: Colorado
- County: Pitkin County / Lake County
- Protected area: Mount Massive Wilderness; Hunter–Fryingpan Wilderness
- Parent range: Rocky Mountains; Sawatch Range
- Topo map: USGS Mount Champion

Climbing
- Easiest route: class 2 hiking

Twining Peak is a 13,711-foot (4,179 m) mountain summit on the shared border of Pitkin County and Lake County, in Colorado, United States.

== Description ==
Twining Peak is set on the Continental Divide 2 miles (3.2 km) north of Independence Pass in the Sawatch Range which is a subrange of the Rocky Mountains. It ranks as the 138th-highest peak in Colorado. The mountain is located 15 miles (24 km) east of the community of Aspen on land managed by White River National Forest and San Isabel National Forest. The peak is situated on the boundary shared by Mount Massive Wilderness and Hunter–Fryingpan Wilderness. Precipitation runoff from the mountain's slopes drains west into headwaters of the Roaring Fork River and east to the Arkansas River via Lake Creek. Topographic relief is significant as the summit rises 2,300 feet (701 m) above Roaring Fork River in one mile (1.6 km) and 2,500 feet (762 m) above North Fork Lake Creek in one mile (1.6 km). An ascent of the peak involves hiking four miles (6.4 km) with 1,700 feet (518 m) of elevation gain and is considered the shortest climb from a paved highway of Colorado's 200 highest peaks.

== Etymology ==
The mountain's toponym was officially adopted on January 1, 1974, by the United States Board on Geographic Names to honor Dr. Warren Hugh Twining (1876–1946), mayor of Aspen (1905–1907), member of Colorado House of Representatives (1925–34), and Speaker of the Colorado State House of Representatives (1933–34). He was instrumental in establishing Western College in Gunnison.

== Climate ==
According to the Köppen climate classification system, Twining Peak is located in an alpine subarctic climate zone with cold, snowy winters, and cool to warm summers. Due to its altitude, it receives precipitation all year, as snow in winter, and as thunderstorms in summer, with a dry period in late spring.

== Gallery ==
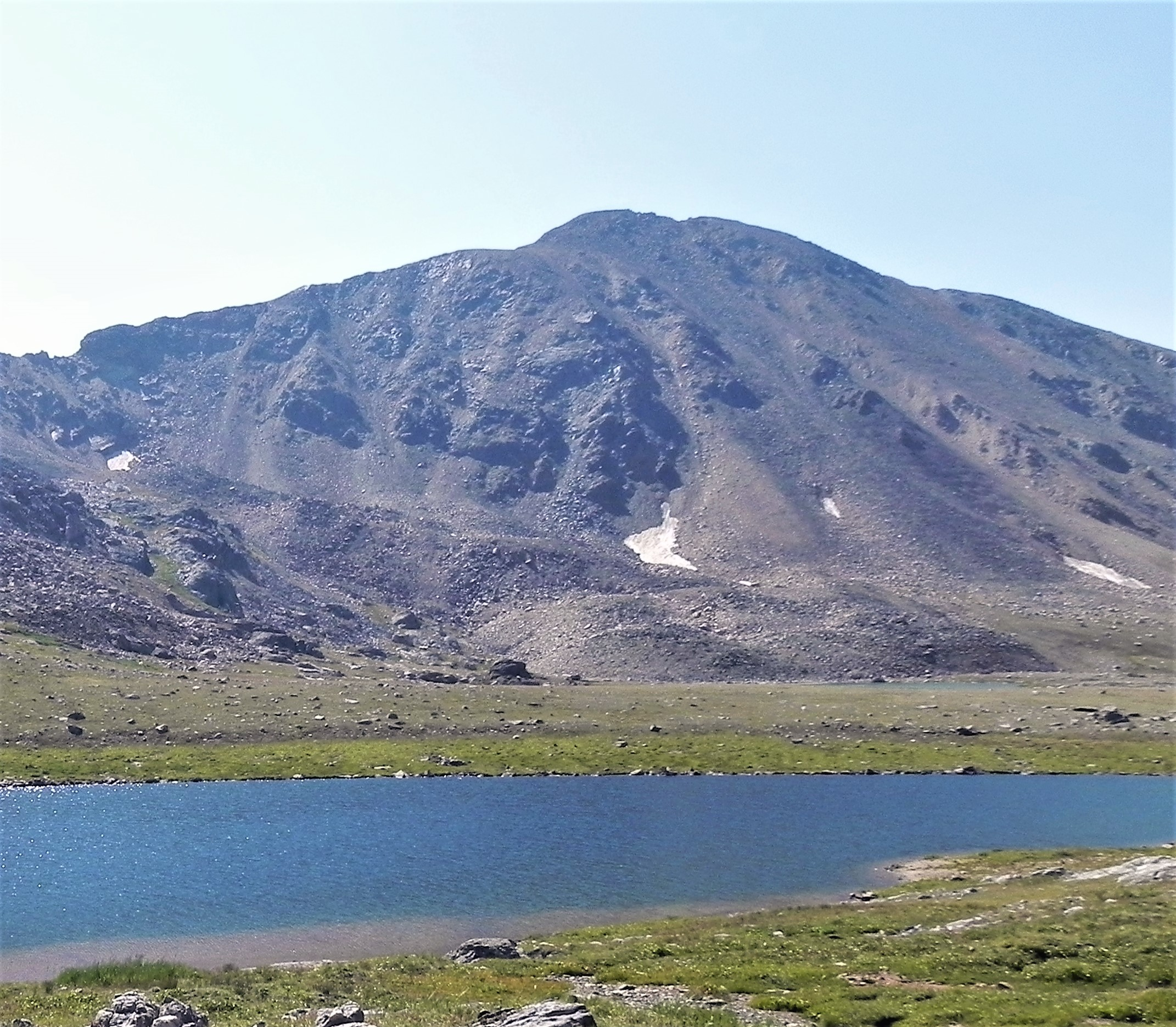
North aspect of Twining Peak from Independence Lake

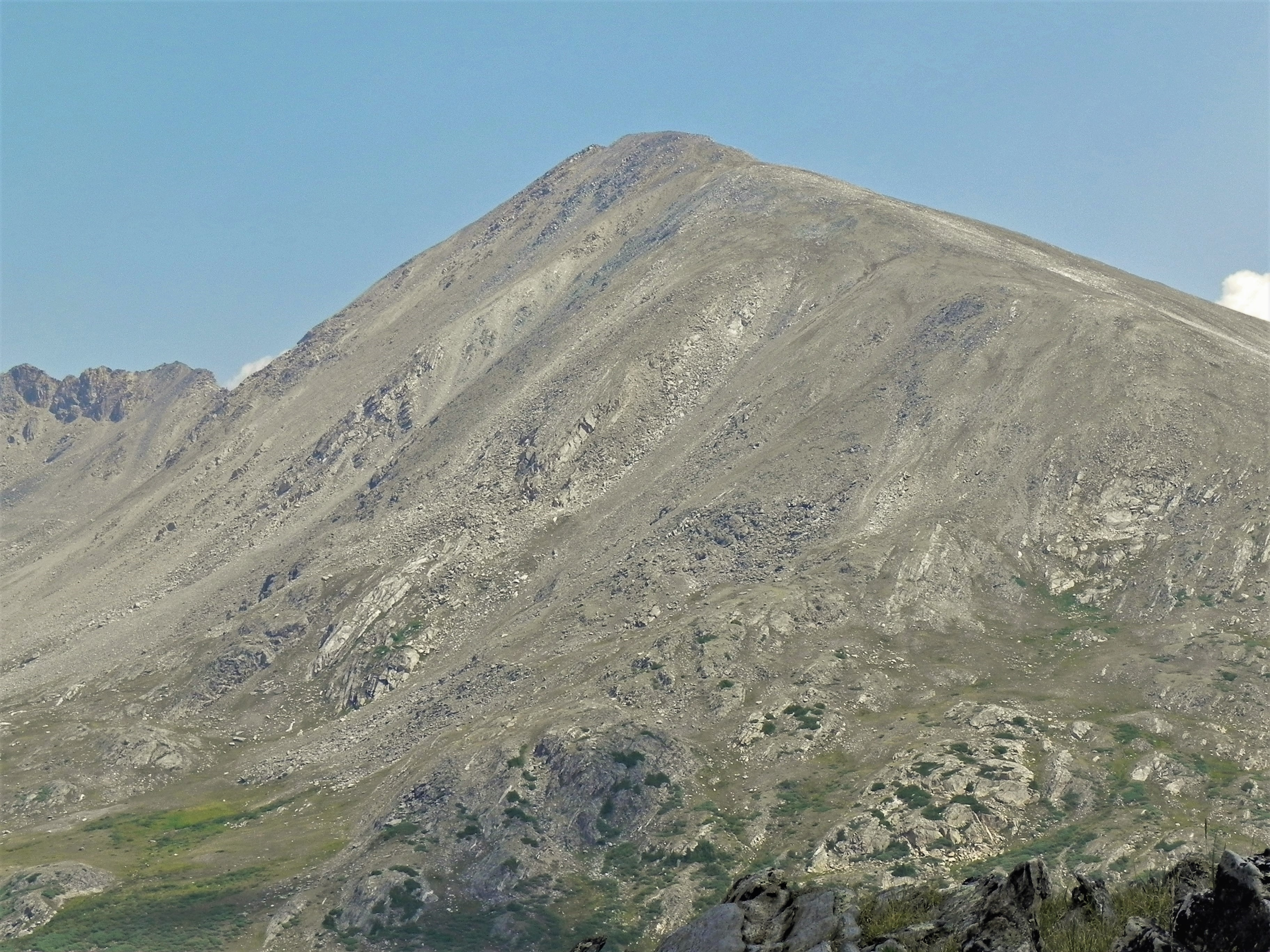
West aspect

== See also ==
- List of mountain peaks of Colorado
- Thirteener
- Geissler Mountain
