= Geissler Mountain =

Mountain in Colorado, United States

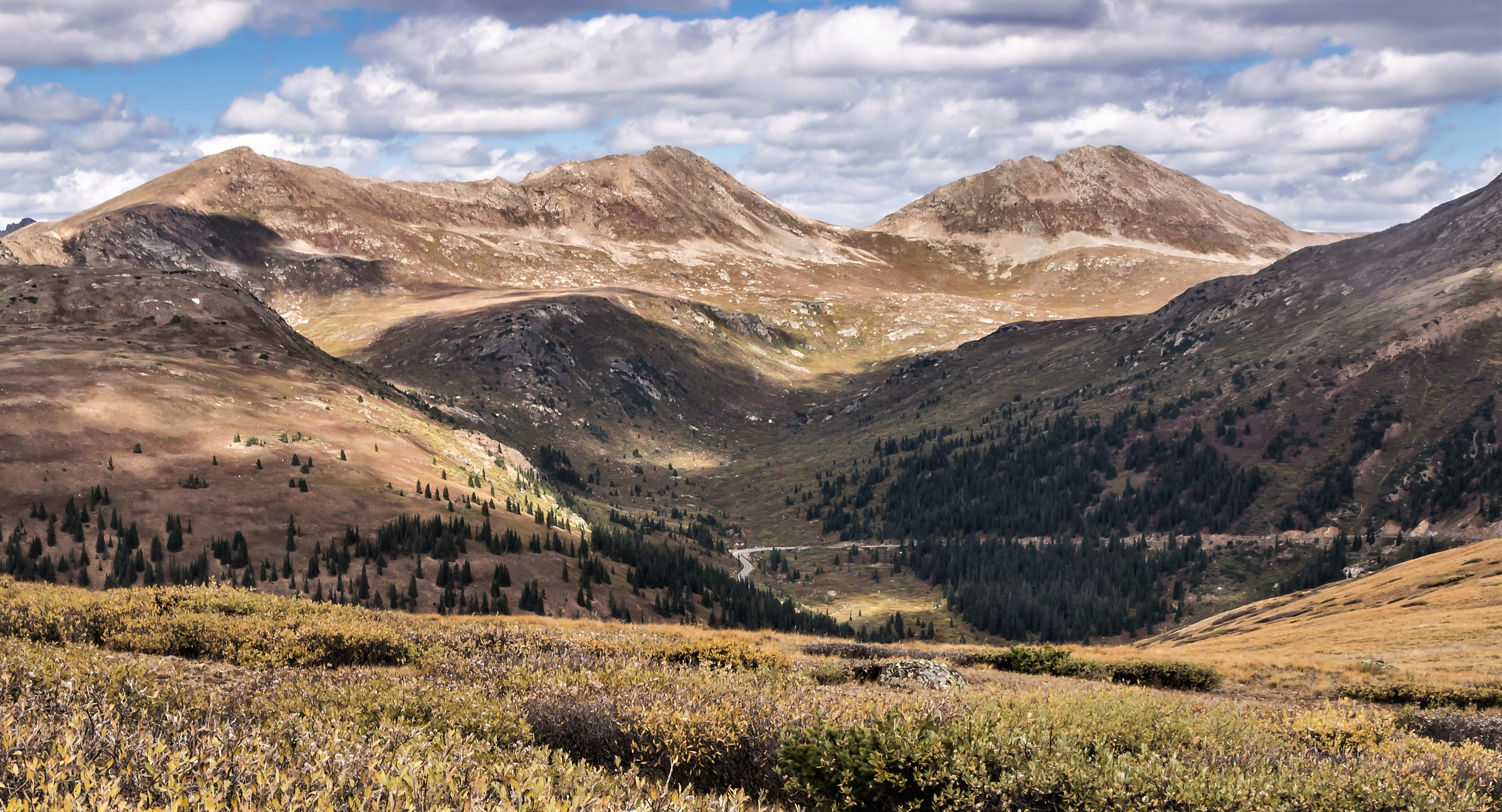
- South aspect West peak centered, East summit to right

Highest point
- Elevation: 13,381 ft (4,079 m)
- Prominence: 575 ft (175 m)
- Parent peak: Twining Peak (13,711 ft)
- Isolation: 0.82 mi (1.32 km)
- Coordinates: 39°08′55″N 106°34′23″W

Geography
- Location within Colorado Location within the United States
- Country: United States
- State: Colorado
- County: Pitkin County
- Protected area: Hunter–Fryingpan Wilderness
- Parent range: Rocky Mountains; Sawatch Range
- Topo map: USGS Mount Champion

Climbing
- Easiest route: class 2 hiking

Geissler Mountain is a 13,381-foot (4,079 m) summit in Pitkin County, Colorado, United States.

== Description ==
Geissler Mountain is set 1 mile (1.6 km) west of the Continental Divide and north of Independence Pass in the Sawatch Range which is a subrange of the Rocky Mountains. The mountain is located 14 miles (23 km) east of the community of Aspen in the Hunter–Fryingpan Wilderness, on land managed by White River National Forest. It ranks as the fourth-highest peak within the wilderness. The mountain has two primary peaks, the higher East summit (13,381') and West summit (13,308'), and the USGS places the summit on the east peak. Precipitation runoff from the mountain's south slope drains into headwaters of the Roaring Fork River and from the north slope into Lost Man Creek which is a tributary of the Roaring Fork. Topographic relief is modest as the summit rises 1,780 feet (543 m) above Lost Man Creek in approximately one mile (1.6 km) and 930 feet (283 m) above Lost Man Lake in 0.25 miles (0.40 km). An ascent of the summit involves hiking five miles (8.0 km) with 1,730 feet (527 m) of elevation gain. The mountain's toponym has been officially adopted by the United States Board on Geographic Names, and has been recorded in publications since at least 1943.

== Climate ==
According to the Köppen climate classification system, Geissler Mountain is located in an alpine subarctic climate zone with cold, snowy winters, and cool to warm summers. Due to its altitude, it receives precipitation all year, as snow in winter, and as thunderstorms in summer, with a dry period in late spring.

== Gallery ==
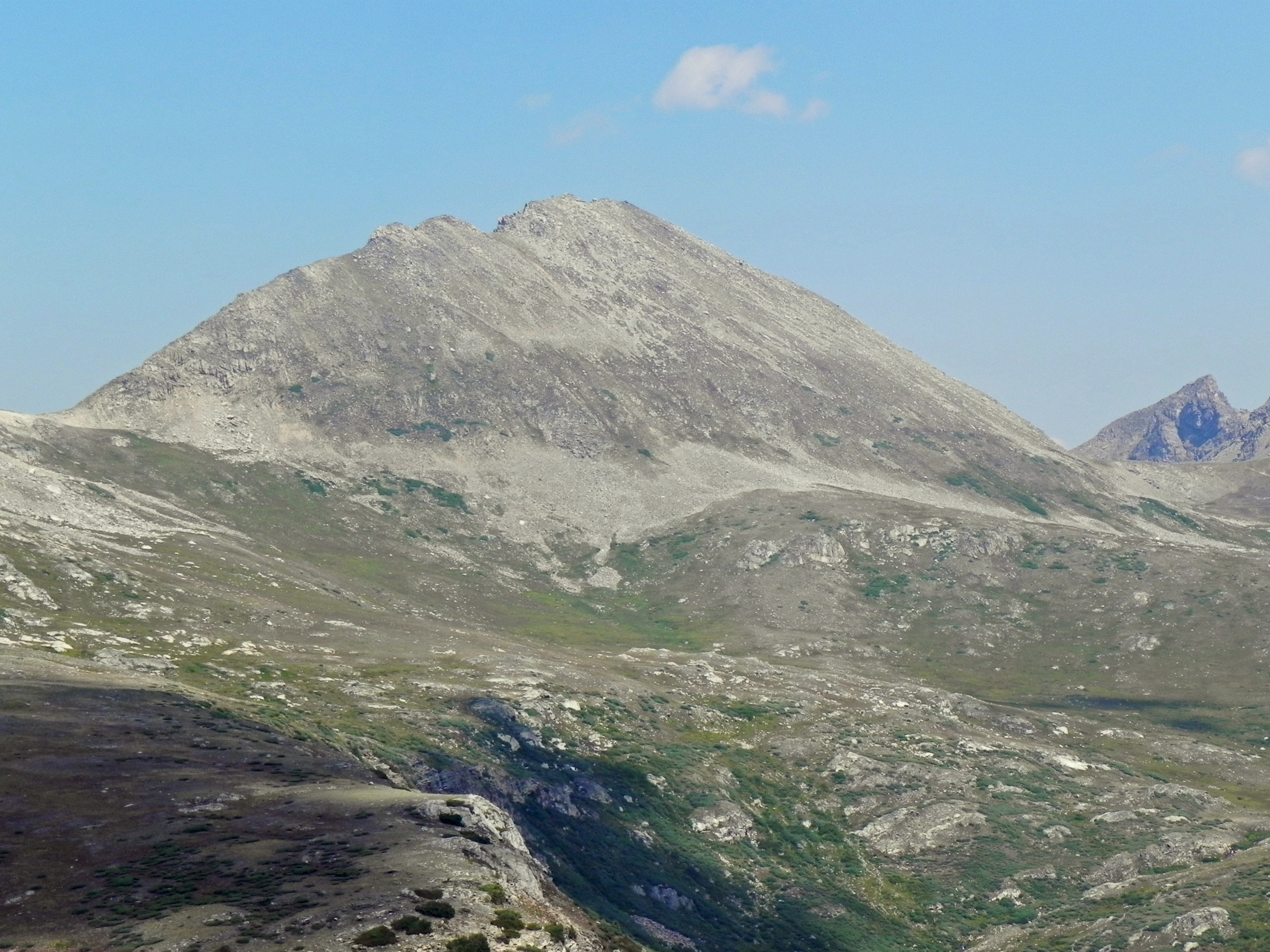
East summit

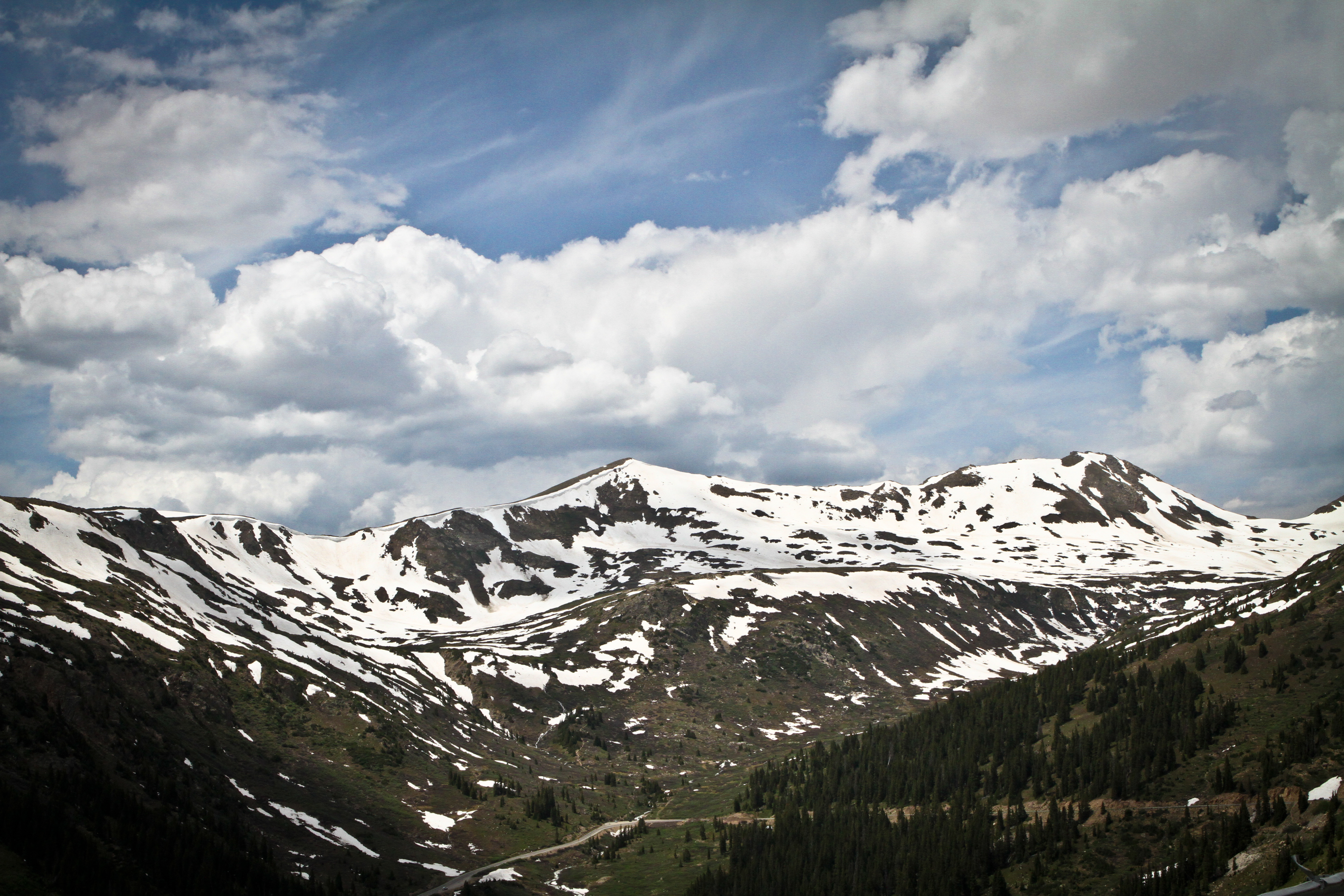
West peak of Geissler (right) with Highway 82 visible at bottom of frame

== See also ==
- List of mountain peaks of Colorado
- Thirteener
