= Independence Lake (Colorado) =

Lake in Pitkin County, Colorado

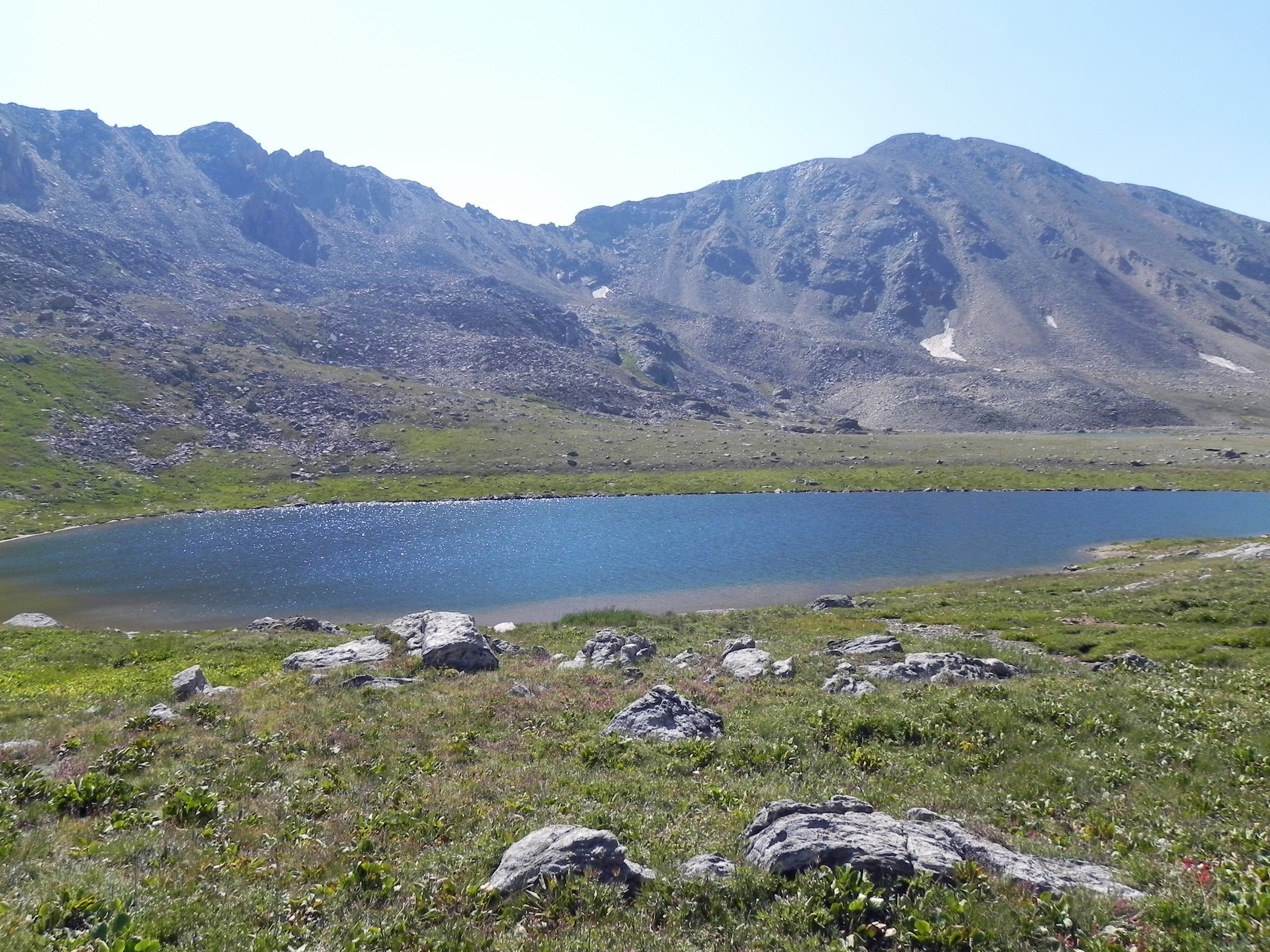
- Independence Lake and Twining Peak

- Location within Colorado Location within the United States
- Location: Pitkin County, Colorado, United States
- Coordinates: 39°08′38″N 106°34′03″W
- Lake type: Glacial
- Primary outflows: Roaring Fork River
- Basin countries: United States
- Max. length: 0.23 mi (0.37 km)
- Max. width: 0.09 mi (0.14 km)
- Surface elevation: 12,497 ft (3,809 m)

Independence Lake is an alpine lake in Pitkin County, Colorado, United States, located high in the Sawatch Range in the Hunter-Fryingpan Wilderness of White River National Forest. It is the source of the Roaring Fork River and is located south and over a pass from Lost Man Lake and north of Twining Peak. The lake is accessible via a trail from State Highway 82 west of Independence Pass.
