= Norrie, Colorado =

Unincorporated community in Pitkin County, CO, USA

- Census-designated place
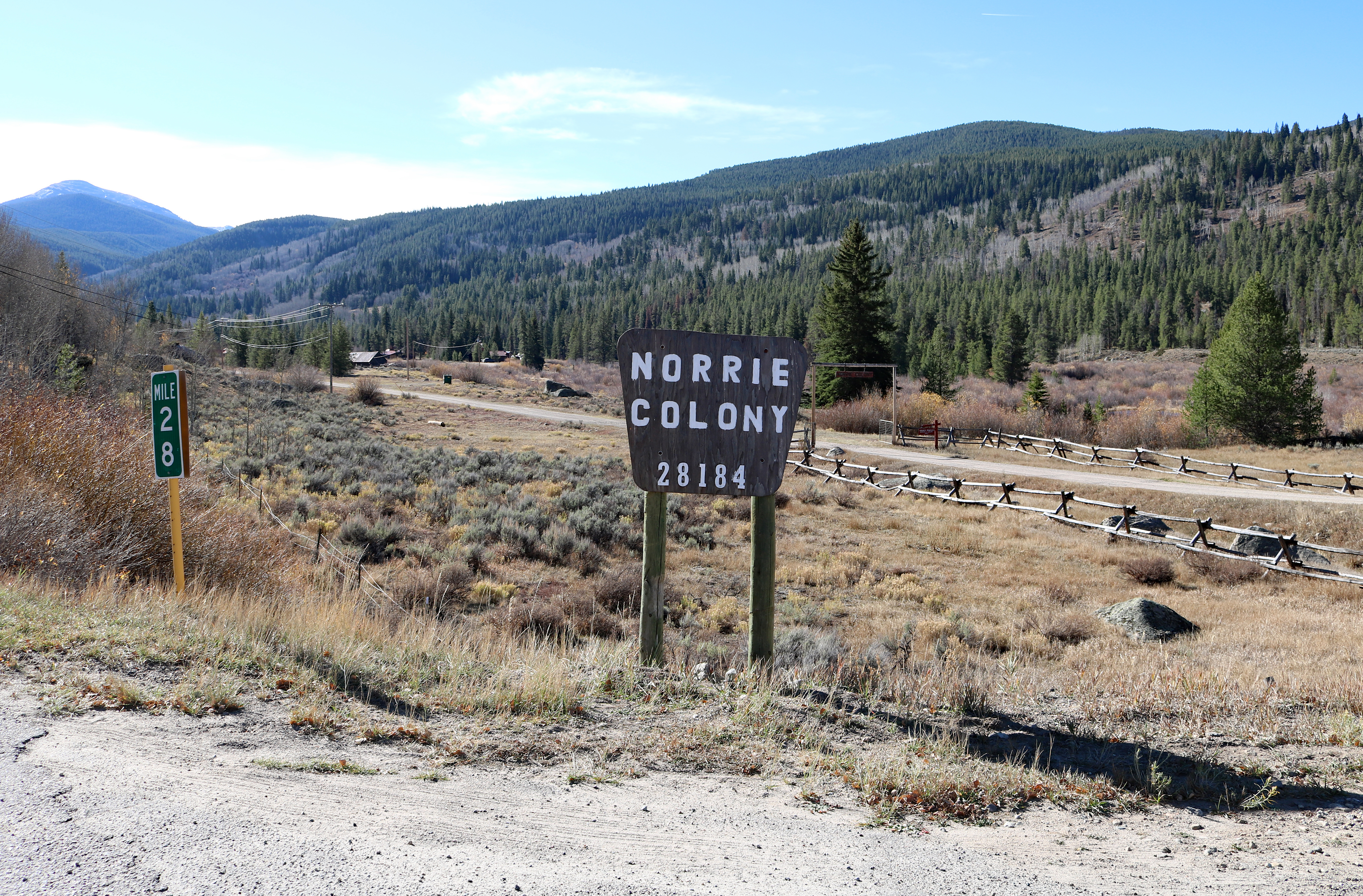
- The entrance to Norrie along Frying Pan Road at mile marker 28.

- Location of the Norrie CDP in Pitkin County, Colorado.
- Coordinates: 39°19′41″N 106°39′23″W
- Country: United States
- State: Colorado
- County: Pitkin

Government
  - Type: Unincorporated community

Area
  - Total: 0.188 sq mi (0.487 km^{2})
  - Land: 0.188 sq mi (0.487 km^{2})
  - Water: 0 sq mi (0.000 km^{2})
- Elevation: 8,449 ft (2,575 m)

Population (2020)
  - Total: 7
  - Density: 37/sq mi (14/km^{2})
- Time zone: UTC-7 (MST)
  - Summer (DST): UTC-6 (MDT)
- ZIP Code: Meredith 81642
- Area code: 970
- GNIS feature ID: 2583272

Norrie (also known as the Norrie Colony) is a census-designated place (CDP) located in and governed by Pitkin County, Colorado, United States. The population of the Norrie CDP was 7 at the United States Census 2020. The Meredith post office (Zip Code 81642) serves the area. The CDP is a part of the Glenwood Springs, CO Micropolitan Statistical Area.

== History ==
Norrie was originally settled in the late 1880s. It began as a camp for railroad workers building the Colorado Midland Railway route along the Fryingpan River. The workers harvested trees used in the railroad construction, and they made ice in the local ponds, ice used in the railroad's refrigerator cars. Now, many privately owned summer cabins line the community's quiet streets.

== Geography ==
The Norrie CDP has an area of 120 acres (0.487 km^{2}), all land.

== Climate ==
The weather station at Nast Lake is 3 miles (4.83 km) south-east of Norrie, at an elevation of 8,700 feet (2,652 m).

Climate data for Nast Lake, Colorado, 1991–2020 normals, 1985-2020 extremes: 8700ft (2652m)
| Month | Jan | Feb | Mar | Apr | May | Jun | Jul | Aug | Sep | Oct | Nov | Dec | Year |
|---|---|---|---|---|---|---|---|---|---|---|---|---|---|
| Record high °F (°C) | 67 (19) | 63 (17) | 75 (24) | 76 (24) | 87 (31) | 91 (33) | 94 (34) | 93 (34) | 88 (31) | 80 (27) | 71 (22) | 51 (11) | 94 (34) |
| Mean maximum °F (°C) | 52 (11) | 55 (13) | 61 (16) | 67 (19) | 77 (25) | 84 (29) | 87 (31) | 85 (29) | 81 (27) | 72 (22) | 61 (16) | 51 (11) | 88 (31) |
| Mean daily maximum °F (°C) | 36.5 (2.5) | 40.2 (4.6) | 47.5 (8.6) | 52.5 (11.4) | 62.4 (16.9) | 74.0 (23.3) | 79.2 (26.2) | 76.0 (24.4) | 69.4 (20.8) | 57.6 (14.2) | 45.2 (7.3) | 36.1 (2.3) | 56.4 (13.5) |
| Daily mean °F (°C) | 19.1 (−7.2) | 22.3 (−5.4) | 30.1 (−1.1) | 36.5 (2.5) | 45.0 (7.2) | 53.7 (12.1) | 59.3 (15.2) | 57.1 (13.9) | 50.5 (10.3) | 40.3 (4.6) | 29.2 (−1.6) | 19.2 (−7.1) | 38.5 (3.6) |
| Mean daily minimum °F (°C) | 1.4 (−17.0) | 4.2 (−15.4) | 12.5 (−10.8) | 20.4 (−6.4) | 28.3 (−2.1) | 33.5 (0.8) | 39.4 (4.1) | 38.0 (3.3) | 31.5 (−0.3) | 23.0 (−5.0) | 12.7 (−10.7) | 2.2 (−16.6) | 20.6 (−6.3) |
| Mean minimum °F (°C) | −18 (−28) | −16 (−27) | −7 (−22) | 5 (−15) | 19 (−7) | 26 (−3) | 32 (0) | 31 (−1) | 22 (−6) | 7 (−14) | −8 (−22) | −18 (−28) | −21 (−29) |
| Record low °F (°C) | −32 (−36) | −31 (−35) | −20 (−29) | −7 (−22) | 8 (−13) | 19 (−7) | 19 (−7) | 12 (−11) | 7 (−14) | −10 (−23) | −23 (−31) | −32 (−36) | −32 (−36) |
| Average precipitation inches (mm) | 2.10 (53) | 1.99 (51) | 2.18 (55) | 2.64 (67) | 1.81 (46) | 0.90 (23) | 1.46 (37) | 1.54 (39) | 1.29 (33) | 1.54 (39) | 1.86 (47) | 1.83 (46) | 21.14 (536) |
Source 1: XMACIS2
Source 2: NOAA (Precipitation)

== Demographics ==
Norrie CDP, Colorado
| Year | Pop. | ±% |
|---|---|---|
| 2010 | 7 | — |
| 2020 | 7 | +0.0% |
Source: United States Census Bureau

The United States Census Bureau initially defined the Norrie CDP for the United States Census 2010.

== Education ==
It is in the Roaring Fork School District RE-1.
