= Linkins Lake =

Lake in Pitkin County, Colorado

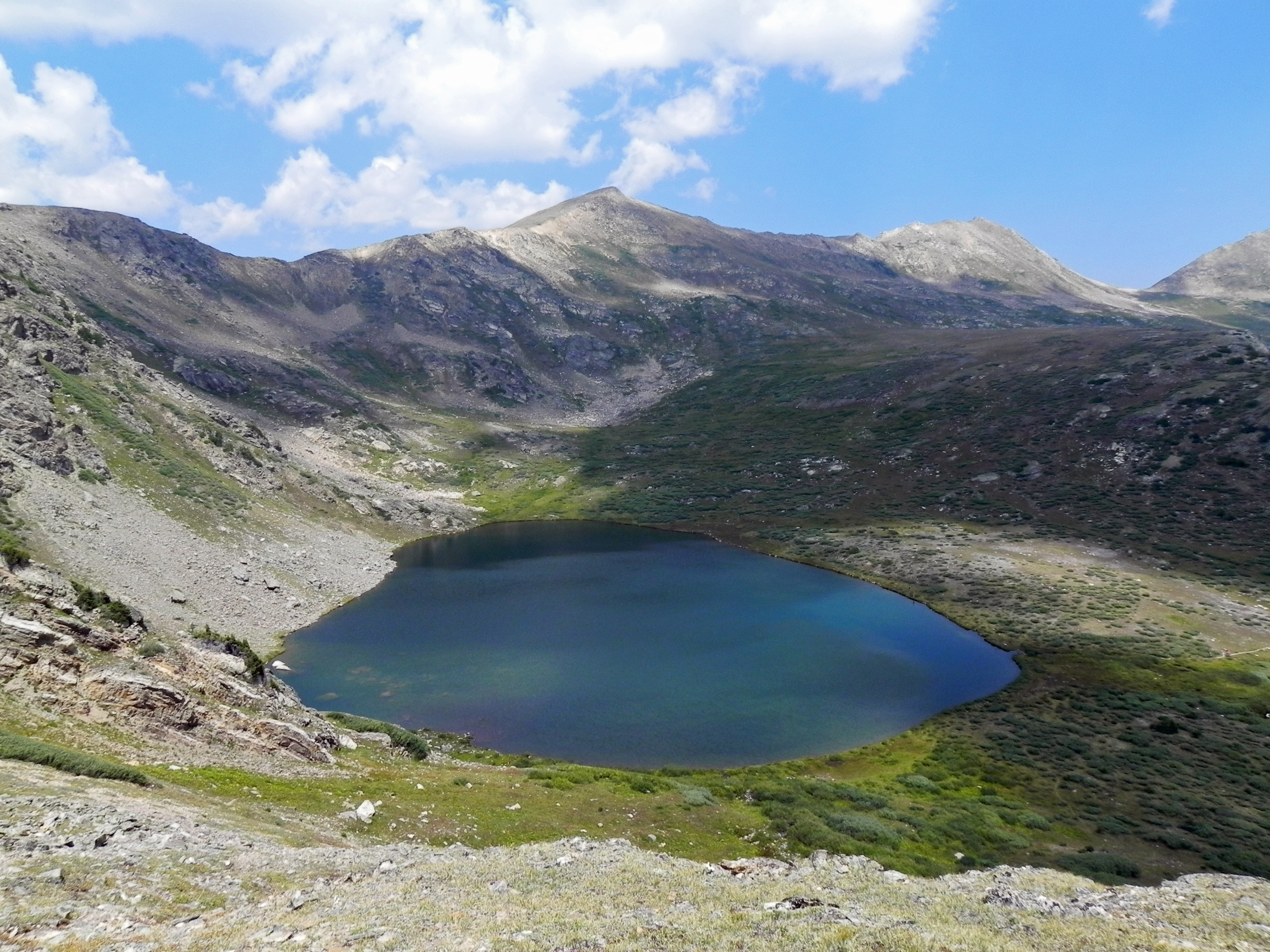
- Linkins Lake

- Location within Colorado Location within the United States
- Location: Pitkin County, Colorado, United States
- Coordinates: 39°07′43″N 106°35′19″W
- Type: Glacial
- Primary outflows: Creek to Roaring Fork River
- Basin countries: United States
- Max. length: 0.20 mi (0.32 km)
- Max. width: 0.13 mi (0.21 km)
- Surface elevation: 12,008 ft (3,660 m)

Linkins Lake is an alpine lake in Pitkin County, Colorado, United States, located high in the Sawatch Range in the Hunter-Fryingpan Wilderness of White River National Forest. The lake is accessible via a 0.6 miles (0.97 km) trail from State Highway 82 west of Independence Pass.
