= Independence Pass =

Highest paved crossing of North America's Continental Divide

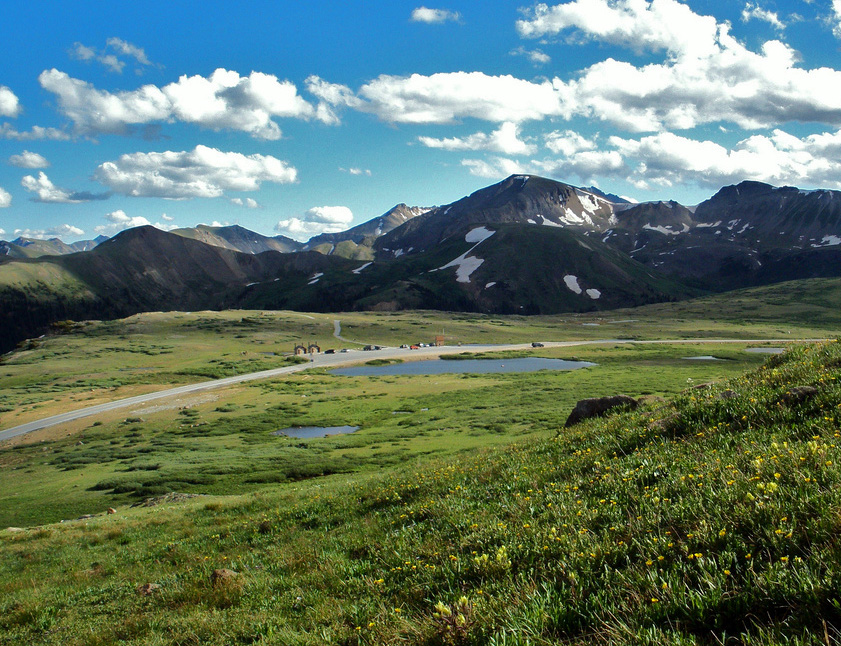
- View across pass from slopes of unnamed peak to the north

- Location within Colorado
- Elevation: 12,095 feet (3,687 m) NAVD 88
- Traversed by: SH 82

Location
- Location: Lake and Pitkin counties, Colorado, United States
- Range: Sawatch
- Coordinates: 39°06′29″N 106°33′52″W
- Topo map: USGS Independence Pass

Independence Pass, originally known as Hunter Pass, is a high mountain pass in central Colorado, United States. It is at elevation 12,095 ft (3,687 m) on the Continental Divide in the Sawatch Range of the Rocky Mountains. The pass is midway between Aspen and Twin Lakes, on the border between Pitkin and Lake counties.

State Highway 82 traverses it, and after Cottonwood Pass to the south, is the second highest elevation of a paved Colorado state highway on a through road. (Note: State Highway 5, the highest paved road in North America, is a dead-end route reaching 14,127 feet (4,306 m), just below the summit of Mount Blue Sky. The recently paved Pikes Peak Highway is another dead-end road and is only slightly lower, with an elevation of 14,115 feet (4,302 m) on the summit of the mountain. Trail Ridge Road in Rocky Mountain National Park, part of U.S. Highway 34, reaches a maximum elevation of 12,183 feet (3,713 m).) It is also the second-highest pass with an improved road in the state, the fourth-highest paved road in the state and the second highest paved crossing of the Continental Divide in the U.S. Because of the heavy snowfall at its elevation, it is closed in wintertime, isolating Aspen from direct access from the east during the ski season.

When the pass is open in warmer weather, it is a popular destination. A scenic overlook near the pass allows visitors to take in the alpine tundra environment above treeline, and offers excellent views to the east of Mount Elbert, Colorado's highest peak and the second-highest mountain in the contiguous United States. Rock climbers are drawn to nearby bouldering opportunities, and informal paths lead to nearby mountain summits of even higher elevation. Backcountry skiers make use of the slopes during the late spring and early summer. Since 2011 the pass has been on the route of the USA Pro Cycling Challenge.

The pass was formed by glacial action and erosion in the region, and its first recorded sighting was by Zebulon Pike in 1806. Ferdinand Hayden surveyed it in 1873. As part of the Continental Divide, it was the limit of European settlement in the region at the time, with the land to the west reserved for the Ute people. Prospectors who defied governor Frederick Walker Pitkin's order crossed the pass on July 4, 1879, giving it its current name and setting up a similarly named village (now a ghost town) to its west. A toll road built across the pass was abandoned and neglected after a railroad connection was made to Aspen. A new road replaced it in the 1920s; portions of the old route can still be seen along the western approach. The Independence Pass Foundation, based in Aspen, works to repair damage to the pass's environment caused by both roads since 1984.

== Geography ==
At the pass, the main ridge of the Sawatch Range, and thus the Continental Divide, turns from running generally south to more southwesterly. North of the pass slopes rise to an unnamed 13,440-foot (4,100 m) peak a half-mile (1 km) away; a ridge of about the same length connects it to the nearest named summit, 13,711-foot (4,179 m) Twining Peak. To the south the ridge rises more gently around Mountain Boy Gulch to an unnamed 13,198-foot (4,023 m) summit 2 miles (3.2 km) distant. The first named summit in this direction is Grizzly Peak, Colorado's highest thirteener.

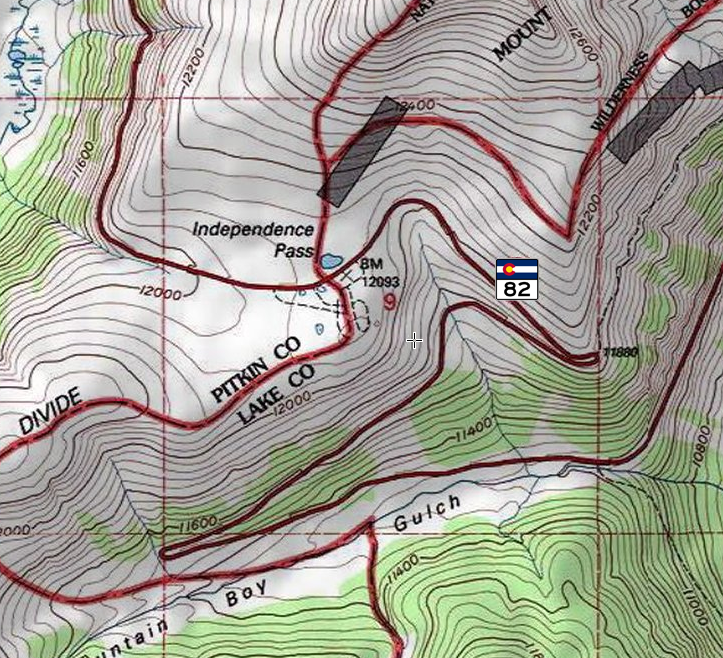
U.S. Geological Survey topographic map of pass

The terrain is level enough, and the ridge broad enough, to allow for a 500-foot (150 m) parking lot along the south side of Highway 82 at the height of land. The pass is split evenly between Pitkin and Lake counties, as well as White River and San Isabel national forests. Boundaries of the Collegiate Peaks Wilderness and the Mount Massive Wilderness are near the pass on the south and north respectively. The Hunter–Fryingpan Wilderness is also nearby.

West of the parking area is a small maintenance shed; on the east are toilet facilities. Both are maintained by the U.S. Forest Service. A paved walkway system extends to a pair of overlooks 500 feet (150 m) to the south allowing views in that direction over the Lake Creek valley to Mount Elbert, at 14,440 feet (4,400 m) the highest peak both in Colorado and the Rocky Mountains, and La Plata Peak, another fourteener and the state's fifth-highest peak. A wide dirt path continues southward three miles (4.8 km) along the ridge to an unnamed 13,020-foot (3,970 m) summit. Across the road a use path leads 2.5 miles (4.0 km) to the summits of the unnamed peak and Twining.

The pass comes roughly in the middle of a 32-mile (51 km) stretch of Highway 82 between the two winter gates, a corridor that is sometimes referred to in its entirety as Independence Pass. Aspen is 19 miles (31 km) to the west, with Twin Lakes 18 miles (29 km) to the east. Beyond Aspen the highway continues down the valley to the mouth of the Roaring Fork at Glenwood Springs. East of Twin Lakes Highway 82 continues a short distance to its eastern terminus at U.S. Highway 24, 15 miles (24 km) south of Leadville.

On both approaches, the dropoff is steep enough for Highway 82 to require a 6 percent grade and switchbacks: one on the west and three on the east. The former approach uses the narrow valley of the Roaring Fork River, a tributary of the Colorado, which rises from Independence Lake west of the pass. Its walls are steeper but shallower than those of the North Fork of Lake Creek, which drains into Twin Lakes Reservoir and the headwaters of the Arkansas River, on the east.

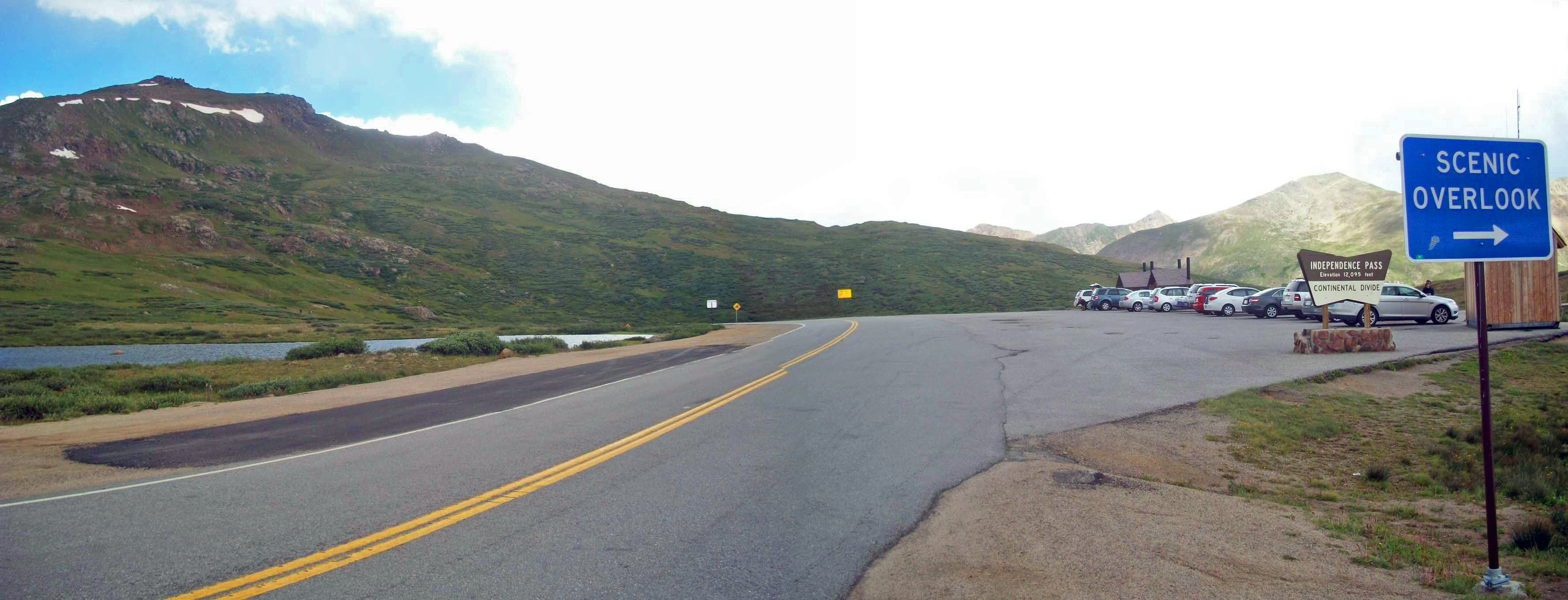
Highway 82 and parking lot

The pass is above tree line, so the surrounding terrain is alpine tundra. Open grassy expanses are occasionally broken by low shrubbery and bare patches of rock, particularly on the steep slope to the north. Snow lingers in some areas year-round. Adjacent to the road and parking area are small ephemeral pools on the southwest, with a larger, permanent one north of the road.

=== Climate ===
Independence Pass has a subarctic climate (Köppen Dfc). Independence Pass experiences a large amount of snowfall, receiving an average of 335 inches (850 cm) a year.

Climate data for Independence Pass, Colorado, 1991–2020 normals, 1985-2020 extremes: 10,600 ft (3,200 m)
Month	Jan	Feb	Mar	Apr	May	Jun	Jul	Aug	Sep	Oct	Nov	Dec	Year
Record high °F (°C)	55 (13)	58 (14)	64 (18)	66 (19)	76 (24)	80 (27)	81 (27)	80 (27)	77 (25)	69 (21)	65 (18)	53 (12)	81 (27)
Mean maximum °F (°C)	46 (8)	47 (8)	54 (12)	58 (14)	65 (18)	73 (23)	76 (24)	74 (23)	70 (21)	62 (17)	53 (12)	46 (8)	76 (24)
Mean daily maximum °F (°C)	30.9 (−0.6)	32.3 (0.2)	39.7 (4.3)	45.3 (7.4)	53.5 (11.9)	63.9 (17.7)	69.1 (20.6)	66.3 (19.1)	59.9 (15.5)	48.7 (9.3)	37.7 (3.2)	30.2 (−1.0)	48.1 (9.0)
Daily mean °F (°C)	16.7 (−8.5)	17.9 (−7.8)	24.6 (−4.1)	31.0 (−0.6)	39.6 (4.2)	48.4 (9.1)	53.7 (12.1)	51.8 (11.0)	45.6 (7.6)	35.4 (1.9)	24.0 (−4.4)	16.2 (−8.8)	33.7 (1.0)
Mean daily minimum °F (°C)	2.6 (−16.3)	3.4 (−15.9)	9.3 (−12.6)	16.7 (−8.5)	25.6 (−3.6)	32.9 (0.5)	38.4 (3.6)	37.4 (3.0)	31.3 (−0.4)	22.1 (−5.5)	10.2 (−12.1)	2.2 (−16.6)	19.3 (−7.0)
Mean minimum °F (°C)	−16 (−27)	−15 (−26)	−9 (−23)	0 (−18)	12 (−11)	24 (−4)	32 (0)	31 (−1)	20 (−7)	4 (−16)	−11 (−24)	−18 (−28)	−20 (−29)
Record low °F (°C)	−36 (−38)	−26 (−32)	−24 (−31)	−18 (−28)	2 (−17)	10 (−12)	22 (−6)	21 (−6)	4 (−16)	−12 (−24)	−21 (−29)	−32 (−36)	−36 (−38)
Average precipitation inches (mm)	2.95 (75)	2.97 (75)	3.31 (84)	3.98 (101)	2.35 (60)	1.22 (31)	1.96 (50)	1.90 (48)	1.91 (49)	2.30 (58)	2.79 (71)	2.61 (66)	30.25 (768)
Average snowfall inches (cm)	50.1 (127)	38.6 (98)	58.8 (149)	45.1 (115)	20.6 (52)	3.8 (9.7)	0.0 (0.0)	0.0 (0.0)	4.9 (12)	20.3 (52)	43.0 (109)	50.8 (129)	336 (852.7)
Source 1: XMACIS2
Source 2: NOAA (Precipitation)

The weather station, Brumley, is situated on the eastern side of Independence Pass, at an elevation of 10,600 feet (3,200 m).

Climate data for Brumley, Colorado, 1991–2020 normals, 1986-2020 extremes: 10,600 ft (3,200 m)
Month	Jan	Feb	Mar	Apr	May	Jun	Jul	Aug	Sep	Oct	Nov	Dec	Year
Record high °F (°C)	56 (13)	54 (12)	63 (17)	62 (17)	75 (24)	77 (25)	80 (27)	76 (24)	75 (24)	69 (21)	62 (17)	54 (12)	80 (27)
Mean maximum °F (°C)	48 (9)	47 (8)	53 (12)	57 (14)	65 (18)	72 (22)	75 (24)	72 (22)	70 (21)	63 (17)	53 (12)	48 (9)	76 (24)
Mean daily maximum °F (°C)	31.7 (−0.2)	32.8 (0.4)	39.5 (4.2)	44.2 (6.8)	52.8 (11.6)	63.1 (17.3)	68.2 (20.1)	65.7 (18.7)	59.8 (15.4)	49.2 (9.6)	38.4 (3.6)	31.3 (−0.4)	48.1 (8.9)
Daily mean °F (°C)	17.8 (−7.9)	18.5 (−7.5)	24.6 (−4.1)	30.5 (−0.8)	39.3 (4.1)	47.8 (8.8)	52.8 (11.6)	51.2 (10.7)	45.4 (7.4)	36.0 (2.2)	24.9 (−3.9)	17.5 (−8.1)	33.9 (1.0)
Mean daily minimum °F (°C)	3.7 (−15.7)	4.1 (−15.5)	9.4 (−12.6)	16.8 (−8.4)	25.8 (−3.4)	32.4 (0.2)	37.4 (3.0)	36.8 (2.7)	30.9 (−0.6)	22.7 (−5.2)	11.4 (−11.4)	3.7 (−15.7)	19.6 (−6.9)
Mean minimum °F (°C)	−15 (−26)	−14 (−26)	−8 (−22)	0 (−18)	13 (−11)	25 (−4)	32 (0)	31 (−1)	21 (−6)	6 (−14)	−8 (−22)	−16 (−27)	−19 (−28)
Record low °F (°C)	−24 (−31)	−28 (−33)	−19 (−28)	−12 (−24)	0 (−18)	19 (−7)	26 (−3)	21 (−6)	10 (−12)	−9 (−23)	−20 (−29)	−30 (−34)	−30 (−34)
Average precipitation inches (mm)	2.02 (51)	2.21 (56)	2.41 (61)	2.87 (73)	2.34 (59)	1.20 (30)	1.69 (43)	1.74 (44)	1.69 (43)	1.83 (46)	2.12 (54)	2.00 (51)	24.12 (611)
Source 1: XMACIS2
Source 2: NOAA (Precipitation)

== History ==
Like the surrounding mountains, the pass was created by glaciation and erosion over thousands of years. Before European-American settlers arrived, it was in the territory of the Ute Native American tribe. One of the earliest sightings by a European-American was in 1806, when Zebulon Pike, mapping the southern boundary of the Louisiana Purchase, spotted the gap in what would later be named the Sawatch Range from the upper Arkansas River valley. It was not explored until Ferdinand Hayden and his team surveyed it in 1873. At the time it was known as Hunter Pass.

Three years later, in 1876, Colorado became a state. At the time settlement had pushed as far west from its capital, Denver, as Leadville. There was a variety of metals and minerals in the surrounding mountains, and some miners had become rich from their claims there. Those who had not been so successful heard about reports from prospectors of abundant silver deposits farther west, over the Divide.

Governor Frederick Walker Pitkin had ordered all settlers to stay to the east of the Divide, as the state and federal governments had not made peace with the Utes. Nevertheless, some defied the order, drawn by the prospect of mining fortunes. Settlers sometimes used Hunter Pass to get to Ashcroft, an early camp on Castle Creek above the Roaring Fork. However, they preferred to take the southern route over the slightly higher Cottonwood Pass through Taylor Park and then back over Taylor Pass to get there, even though this made for a 100-mile (160 km) journey, 40 miles (64 km) more than the direct route offered by Hunter Pass.

On July 4, 1879, a group from Leadville struck gold in the uppermost Roaring Fork valley below the pass. Four miles (6.4 km) to the west, they established a settlement in the upper Roaring Fork Valley that eventually took the name Independence from the holiday on which it was established. The pass, the lake from which the Roaring Fork rises and another nearby mountain all took that name as well. The Twin Lakes and Roaring Fork Toll Company, established to build a road through to the camps in the lower Roaring Fork Valley, improved the original path over the pass sufficiently enough by 1880 that horses could be used for the trip.

Independence grew quickly when more gold was found in the nearby mountains. Within two years of its settlement permanent buildings had replaced the original tents, and a mining concern from Leadville had bought up all the claims. In two years they produced gold worth $190,000 ($6.34 million in modern dollars), funding the construction of a stamping mill and sawmill. In Aspen, farther down the valley, silver was found in even greater abundance than Independence's gold. B. Clark Wheeler, an early investor in those mines, funded the construction of a stage road to Leadville, the first road to cross the pass. It opened in November 1881, with winter already in full swing at the pass.

The road charged 25 cents ($8 in modern dollars) for saddle horses and twice that for two-axle stagecoaches. The tolls, collected at three separate gates, primarily reflected the cost of retaining a large crew of men with snow shovels to keep the road open in wintertime; they were able to keep the road open through its first five winters. When the snow was too deep, sleighs were used instead. During the summer the stages were able to take the switchbacks at full speed, with dogs running in advance to warn other traffic. A typical voyage over the pass required 10–25 hours and five changes of horses.

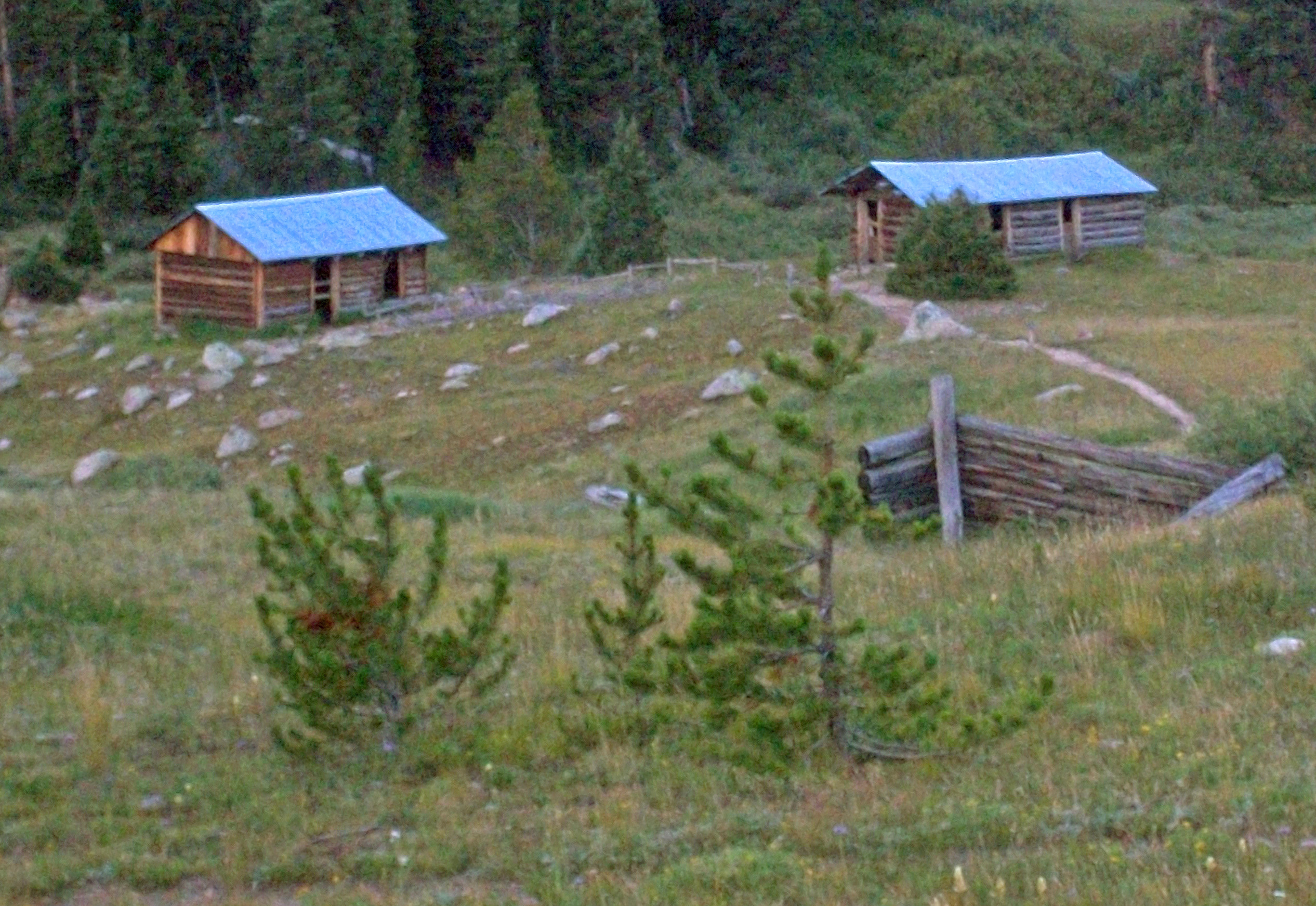
Some of the remaining buildings of Independence, 2010.

The road improved Independence's economy, since coaches often stopped there on the multi-day journey. However, the year of its construction would turn out to be the settlement's economic peak year. Gold production dropped off after 1884. Independence's decline in population, remote location and severe high-altitude winters cost it the opportunity to be seat of newly formed Pitkin County to Aspen, located on a larger plain farther down the river and growing much more rapidly due to the Colorado Silver Boom. When a rail connection was made to that city in 1888, the stage road fell into disuse, further hurting Independence's economy. All but one of the remaining residents decamped as a group to Aspen on improvised cross-country skis during the severe winter of 1899. The holdout, J.R. Williams, remained until 1920. The nearby Williams Mountains were named for him.

By then Aspen's prosperity had receded as well. Congress repealed the Sherman Silver Purchase Act in response to the Panic of 1893, which took the largest buyer of the city's silver out of the market. Aspen began a period of steady decline known today as "the quiet years" as mines gradually closed down. The route over the pass remained useful, however. In 1895 a telephone line was routed over it.

Although its population had dropped below a thousand by the late 1920s, in 1927 the state replaced the stage road with what eventually became Highway 82. Unlike the stage road, it was closed during the winter months. While most of the old route was used for the new road, a portion of the original grade remains three miles below the pass on the east side. It includes the foundation of the gatekeeper's house and the remains of the gate.

During the Great Depression, another large public works project involved the pass. The federal Works Progress Administration (WPA) oversaw the construction of the Twin Lakes Tunnel, which diverted water from Grizzly Reservoir, on Lincoln Creek, a southern tributary of the Roaring Fork, to Twin Lakes, where it was used for irrigation purposes by beet and watermelon farmers in the Rocky Ford and Ordway areas. Starting in 1935, a volume of 50,000 acre-feet (62 million cubic meters) were made available this way.

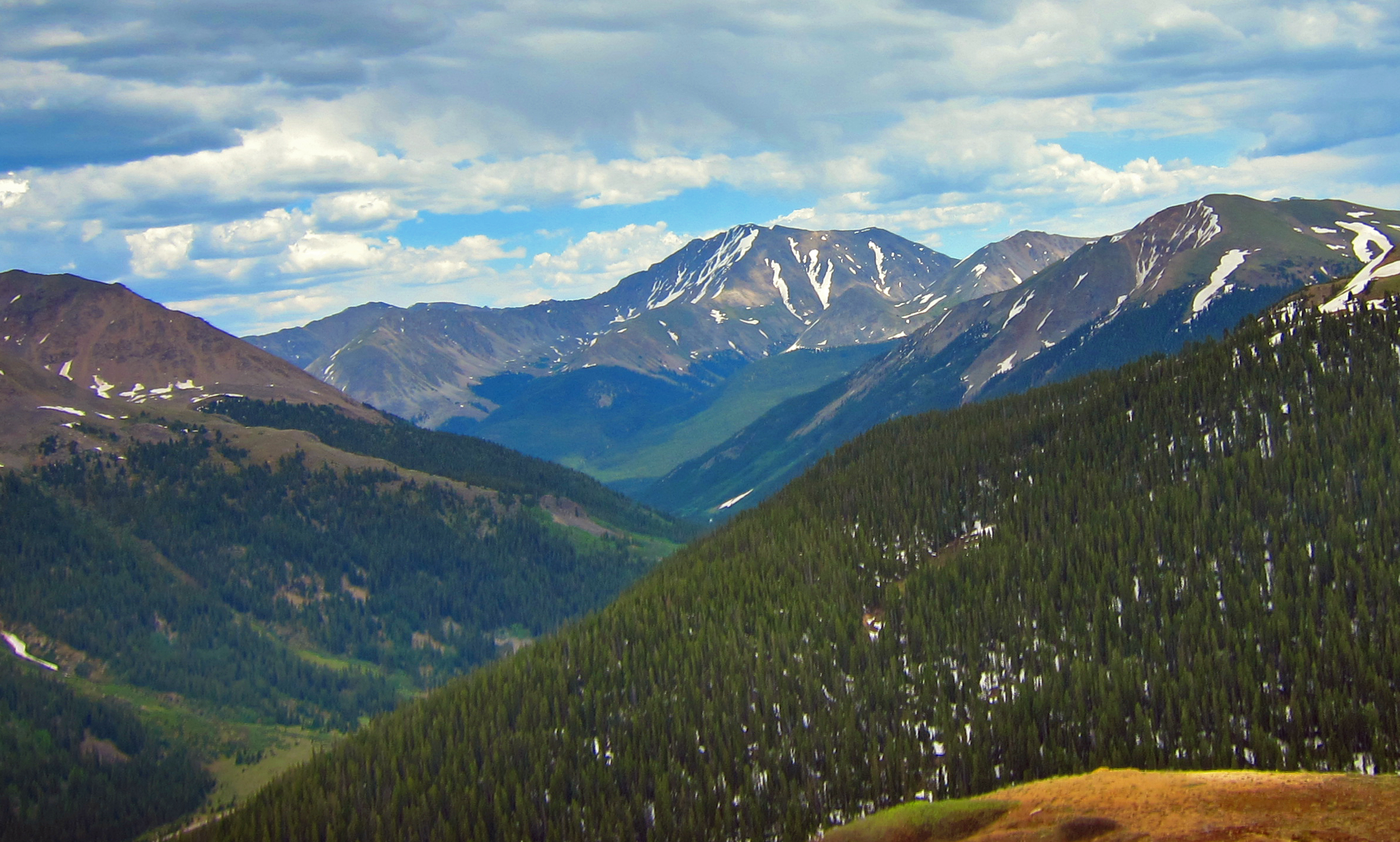
View of La Plata Peak from the pass

Another WPA effort recognized the pass as a scenic attraction. A travel guidebook for automobile touring produced by the Federal Writers' Project gave as one route the trip along Highway 82 from Twin Lakes. It noted the distinctive landscape of the pass:

The highway rises in a series of loops and curves towards the Continental Divide. Thinning pines, gnarled and stubby from their fight for existence, give way to bare boulders, hardy grasses and the alpine vegetation of a world above the clouds. The road along the sheer face of the mountain, while steep, is one of the safest traversing a pass in Colorado. A stone monument and several small lakes mark the summit of Independence Pass, the highest and probably the most impressive automobile pass in the state. An arctic meadowland overshadowed only by the topmost notches of the Sawatch Range, it rises far above the peaks that towered high when viewed from the Lake Creek valley.

After World War II, Aspen began to grow and prosper again due to the establishment of a popular ski resort, an annual music festival, and a relaxed lifestyle which attracted many celebrities and corporate executives to the city. Visitors to Aspen generally had to take Highway 82 up from Glenwood Springs or fly in, as few wanted to drive over the unpaved pass road. In 1967 the State Highway Department remedied this by paving the road over the pass. It has since been designated part of Colorado's "Top of the Rockies" scenic byway by the state and federal departments of transportation.

== Environment ==
The alpine tundra biome of the pass extends below it on either side to an elevation of approximately 11,500 feet (3,500 m), or about the altitude of the Linkins Lake trailhead on the western side, Highway 82's uppermost crossing of the Roaring Fork. Below it is a subalpine zone where lodgepole pine, Engelmann spruce, subalpine fir and aspen dominate the forest. A few patches of those trees persist above that elevation, but they are mostly stunted krummholz.

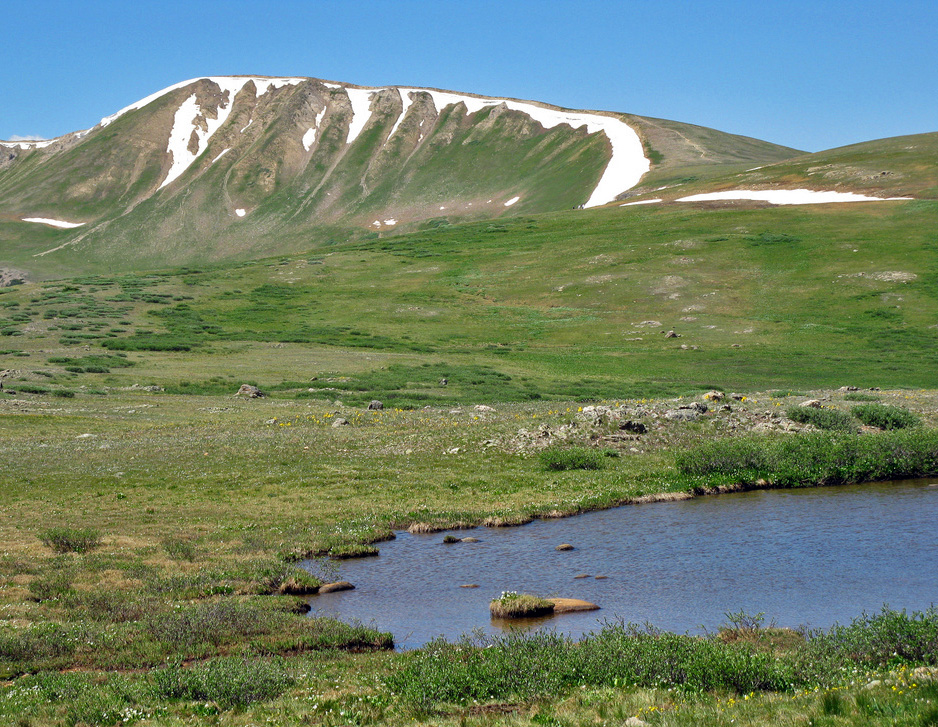
Alpine tundra and pool south of the pass

Tree growth above those patches is curtailed by the alpine climate of the pass. It is characterized by severe changes in temperature, high winds and the deep winter snow. The resulting short growing season is made even shorter by the thin soil.

The most predominant plant species in the alpine zone around the pass are the grass species adapted to the harsh climate. Other alpine flora, such as moss and lichens on the rocks, and wildflowers in season, make appearances. Shrubs that survive among them include strawberry, snowberry, willows and bog birch. Animals in the alpine zone include ptarmigans, small burrowing species like pika, marmots, and pocket gopher, and mountain goats.

Two types of rock are found in the pass and its vicinity. Quartz monzonite forms many of the cliffs, while the crags are biotite gneiss. The glaciation, which dates to as recently as 12,000 years ago, smoothed much of the rock to the point of it being slippery.

== Visitor attractions ==
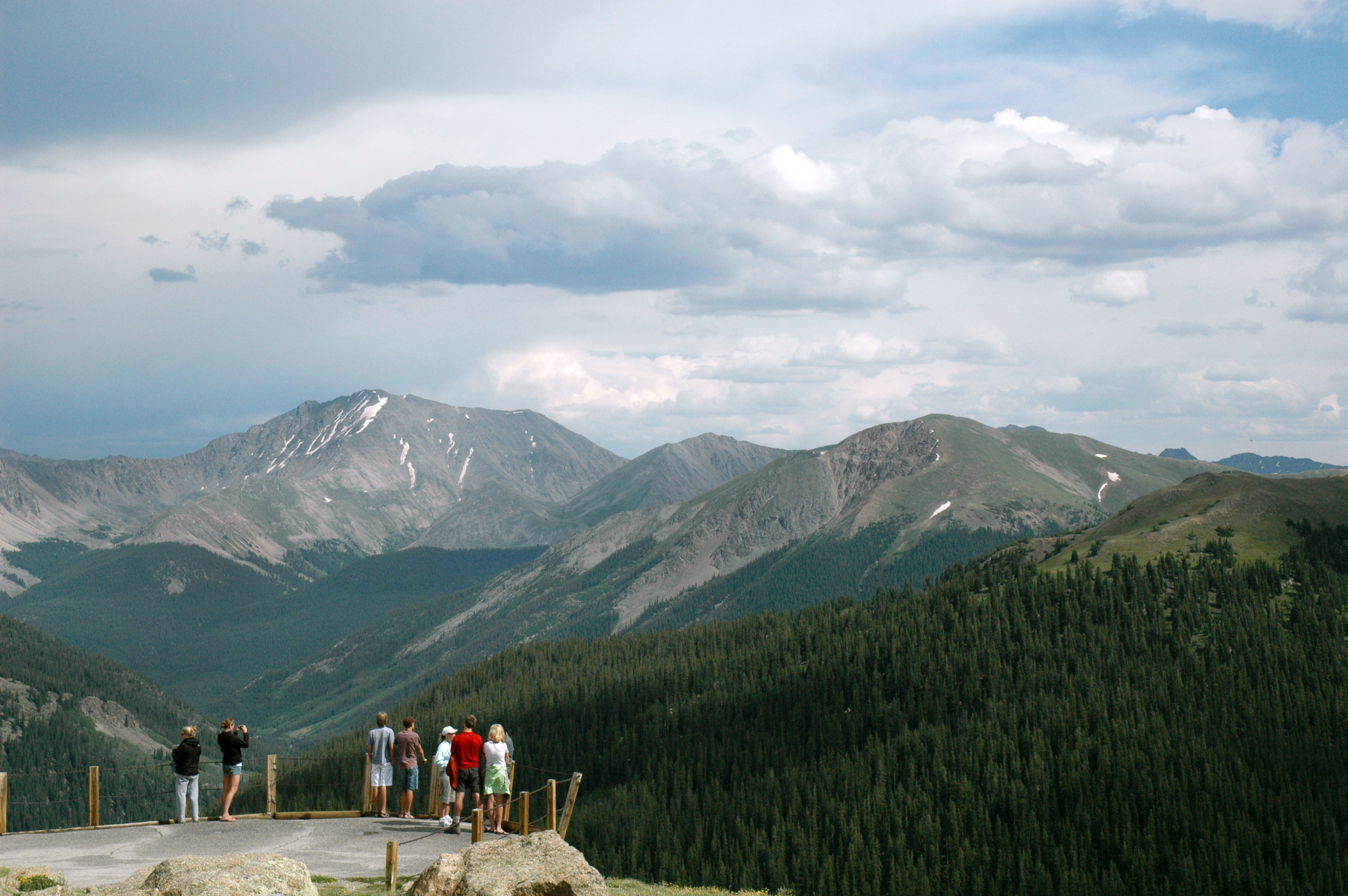
Scenic overlook with view southeast

Many visitors stop at the parking lot and walk the paved path to the scenic overlook. In clear enough weather it offers views east of Mount Elbert, Colorado's highest peak, and La Plata Peak, the state's fifth-highest at 14,336 feet (4,370 m). To the west more fourteeners—the Maroon Bells, Snowmass Mountain and Capitol Peak—stand out among the mountains. A trail with Braille interpretive plaques is available for visually impaired visitors.

Other outdoor recreation opportunities exist at and near the pass. Between the pass and Difficult Campground, 3 miles (4.8 km) east of Aspen, there are many popular rock climbing areas, some with grades up to 5.12 under the Yosemite Decimal System. The Grotto Wall across from Lincoln Gulch campground is a frequent destination. Closer to the pass are Instant Karma Cliff and Putterman's Dome. A pair of rocks along either side of Highway 82 on the east approach to the pass are popular bouldering spots.

On the days after the pass reopens in the spring, backcountry skiers often take advantage of the remaining snow on the slopes. In years following heavy winters, skiing is possible into July.

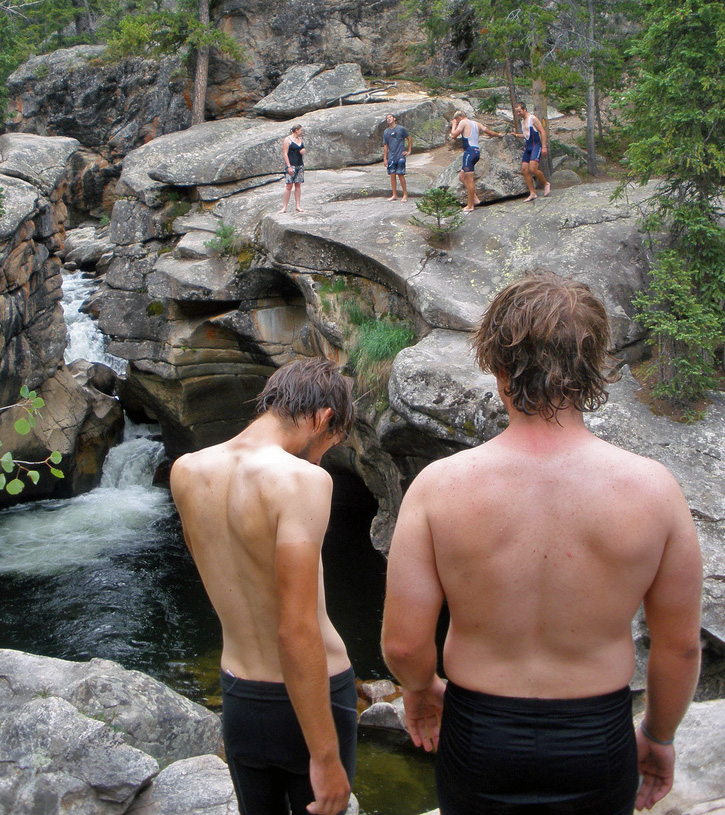
Swimmers at Devil's Punchbowl

Water-based recreation is available near the pass as well, particularly on the Roaring Fork side. At the Grottos climbing cliffs eight miles (13 km) to the west of the pass, a short trail leads to an area along the river known as the Devil's Punchbowl, with high stone cliffs on either side and waterfalls. It is a popular swimming hole due to its deep and cool waters. The river is popular with anglers casting for trout as well, and some even make the hike from the pass up to Blue Lake for its lake and cutthroat trout stocks.

Four miles (6.4 km) west of the pass is the site of Independence, the village whose establishment on July 4 led to the pass's current name. It has been a ghost town since the early 20th century. In 1973 it was listed on the National Register of Historic Places. Most of its buildings were cannibalized for their building supplies, but a few log cabins remain. The Aspen Historical Society, in conjunction with the U.S. Forest Service, built an interpretive trail with plaques.

In 2011 the USA Pro Cycling Challenge bicycle race around Colorado was held for the first time. A 131-mile (211 km) stage from Gunnison to Aspen was routed over both Cottonwood and Independence passes. Spectators were allowed to camp at the pass; their impact on the pass's environment led to a ban on camping within 10 miles (16 km) of it for the following year's event. The Forest Service posted signs reminding spectators at the pass of the fragility of the surrounding tundra.

== Travel advisories and restrictions ==
The Colorado Department of Transportation (CDOT) restricts the use of Highway 82 through the pass. Most significant is the winter closure. The road is typically closed after the first significant winter snowfall, or by November 7 at the latest (but there have been exceptions.). CDOT tries to reopen just before Memorial Day weekend in late May, the traditional beginning of summer in the United States, when enough of the accumulated snowpack has melted to make it possible to clear and repair the road. Some years, after light winters, the pass has reopened as early as May 12. Two gates, just east of Aspen on the west end and west of the remaining buildings of the stage stop of Everett on the east, prevent motor vehicles from passage. When the road is closed, Aspen is isolated from the east and Highway 82 up the valley from Glenwood Springs becomes the only vehicular access to the city during its busy ski season.

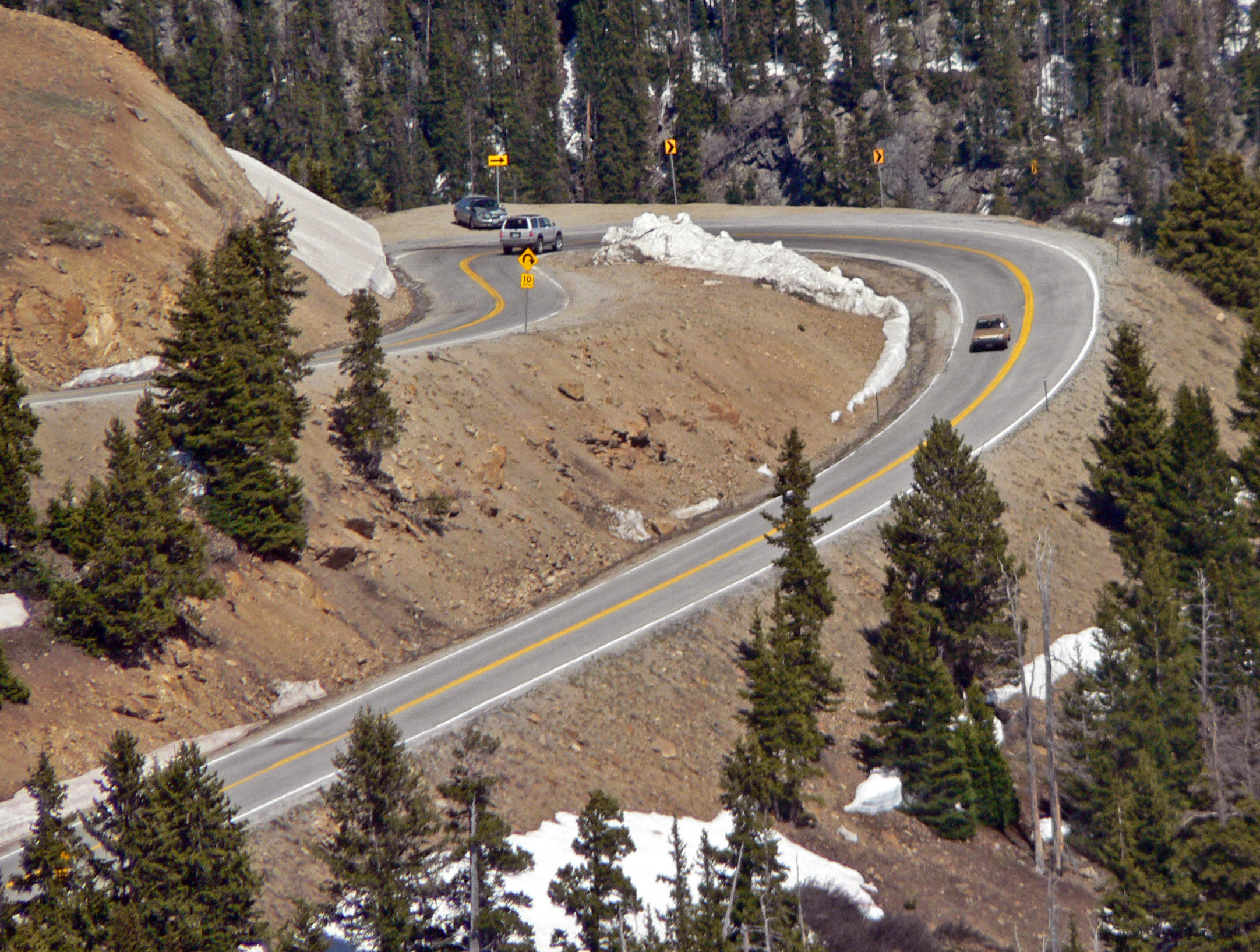
Switchback on east approach

Even when the pass is open, not all vehicles may use the road. Oversized and overweight vehicles are prohibited from the pass, as are all vehicles or vehicle combinations longer than 35 feet (11 m) regardless of weight or size. This precludes use of the pass by tractor trailers, buses, and recreational vehicles.

Some truck drivers use the pass despite the prohibition. They are generally either unaware of the restriction and following routes plotted by their GPS devices, or aware of it and willing to risk the fine for the sake of the time and distance saved. The resulting accidents have sometimes forced the closure of the pass. CDOT put up larger signs advising drivers of the ban and worked with GPS device manufacturers so their software notes the restriction. Aspen officials have suggested increasing the fines as a deterrent.

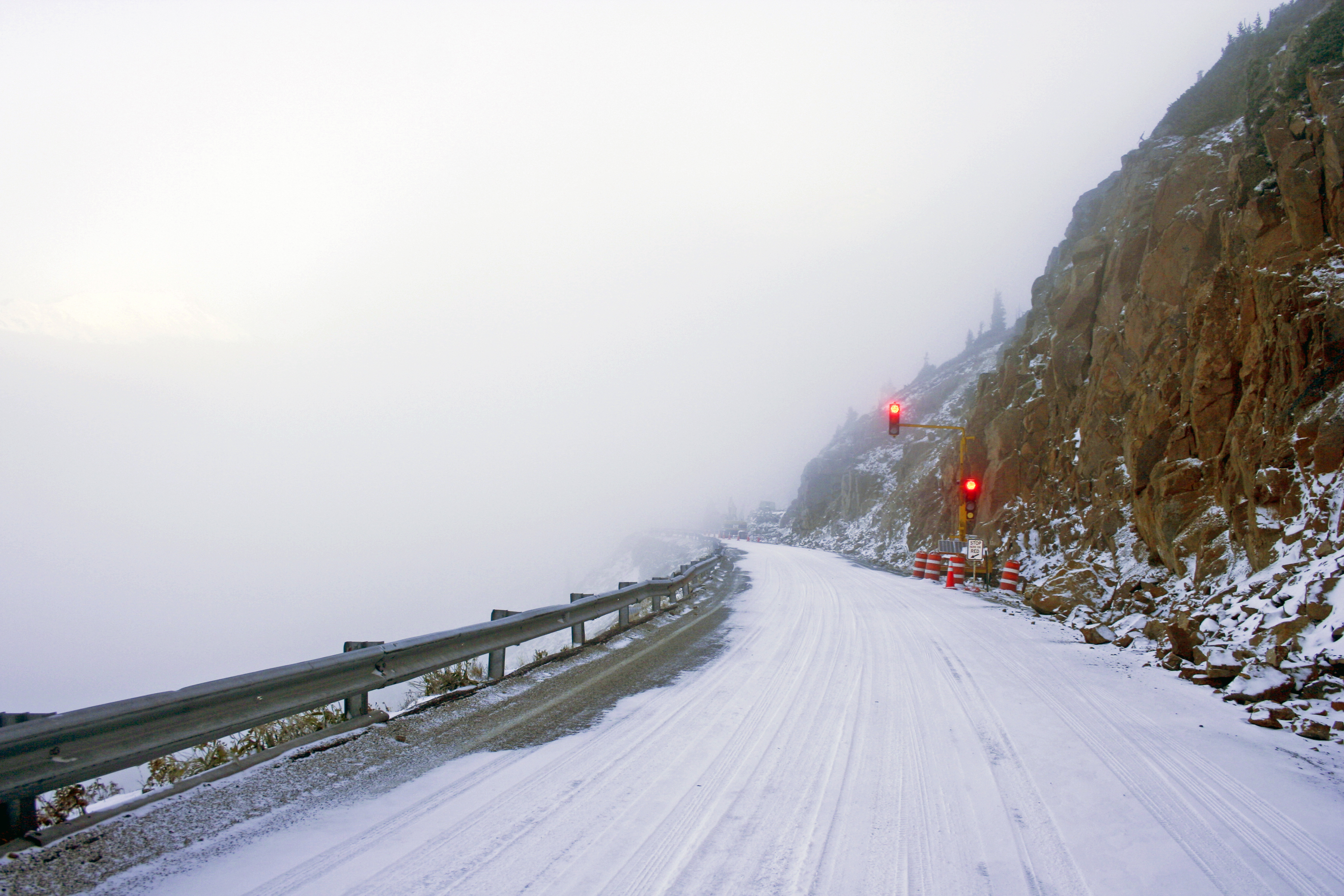
Snow, single-lane sections, and steep dropoffs are among the many hazards encountered on Highway 82 through the pass

Driving through the pass is challenging. Both approaches require 6% grades due to the height of the pass, and require navigating hairpin turns with advisory speeds of 10 mph (16 km/h). Rockfalls, particularly on the approach from Aspen, have narrowed some sections to a single lane 12 feet (3.7 m) wide with temporary traffic lights. On the Twin Lakes approach, they have resulted in temporary closures. Other vehicles frequently enter the road unexpectedly at the many parking areas for campgrounds and other recreational attractions, and bicyclists make frequent use of Highway 82 as well. Lastly, the weather at the pass can be unpredictable and vary considerably from conditions in either Aspen or Twin Lakes. There may be thunderstorms on otherwise clear days, and snow can occur at any time of the year. CDOT advises anyone coming to the pass for outdoor recreation to take precautions against the effects of the high altitude and the changeable weather.

== Independence Pass Foundation ==
Since the days of the stage road, avalanches and rockfalls often forced closures of the highway, partly due to the massive disturbance of the land during the road's construction. No attempt was made to remedy this until shortly after the automobile road was built. In the 1930s, as a relief project during the Great Depression, a crew from the Civilian Conservation Corps replanted the slopes around Independence, by then abandoned for two decades.

At that time, Aspen was a faded mining town whose population had dwindled to fewer than a thousand. Later in the decade the first efforts to develop a ski resort began. They continued after World War II, and in the later decades of the 20th century the city began to grow again. Other than paving the road, CDOT was unable to undertake any significant improvements to the highway corridor due to its projects elsewhere in the state and the requirement to coordinate efforts with the Forest Service, which owns most of the damaged land.

Beginning in 1976, Bob Lewis, an environmental activist in Aspen, organized revegetation efforts on some sections of the pass near the road that were having serious erosion problems. He realized eventually that a dedicated nonprofit organization would be a better way to address the many issues that remained. The Independence Pass Foundation (IPF) was established in 1989. Its first project, coordinated with the Forest Service, CDOT and Pitkin County, was the reconstruction of a curve near the popular Weller Lake trailhead.

The success of the Weller Curve project cleared the way for work on the Top Cut, the 1.5-mile (2.4 km) stretch just below the summit on the western side, which includes the most seriously eroded slopes anywhere in the pass corridor. Lewis had always intended to focus the IPF's efforts on it, and the organization began the first of several ongoing projects there in 1996. Work included the construction of stone retaining walls as well as revegetation. By the 2010s the results were evident.

With the success of these projects, IPF has been doing revegetation projects along the road below the Top Cut since 2004. Compost blankets were applied to large sections of the soil to replace lost nutrients. In 2009 the foundation began removing metal and rebar snow fences embedded in the soil just below the pass summit during the 1960s as part of an abortive project to increase meltwater capture by the Twin Lakes Tunnel. According to the IPF, they were an aesthetic blight as well as an environmental problem, and had to be removed using a team of mules and helicopters due to the wilderness area restrictions. The last fence material was removed in 2012.

IPF has undertaken other projects to promote awareness of the work that needs to be done at the pass to protect its distinctive environment. Groups from local schools have spent a day up in the pass working and learning. Many have adopted the same sites and work on them with a new class each year. Along with the Aspen Center for Environmental Studies, the foundation also cosponsors a "My Independence" all-day walking tour of the pass for adults that covers ecological topics in depth.

Since 1994, the foundation has held a 'Ride for the Pass' charity bicycle race in May, just before CDOT reopens the pass. The event serves as an outreach event and fundraiser. It follows a 9.5-mile (15.3 km) route from the gate east of Aspen to the Independence townsite, climbing 2,500 feet (760 m) in the process. By 2012, the IPF had canceled the event twice due to poor weather.

== See also ==
- Colorado mountain passes
- List of mountain passes
- List of Rocky Mountain passes on the continental divide
