= W. H. Twining =

American politician (1876–1946)

Warren Hugh Twining (January 12, 1876 – July 1946) was an American politician who served as speaker of the Colorado House of Representatives.

== Biography ==
Twining was born in Wisconsin. He would become a physician and was instrumental in establishing Western College in Gunnison.

== Political career ==
Twining was a member of the House of Representatives from 1925 to 1934, serving as Speaker from 1933 to 1934. He was a Democrat. He served as mayor of Aspen from 1905 to 1907.

== Honors ==
In 1974, Twining Peak was officially named in his honor. The peak is located 15 miles east of Aspen.
