= Meredith, Colorado =

Unincorporated community in Pitkin County, CO, USA

- Unincorporated community
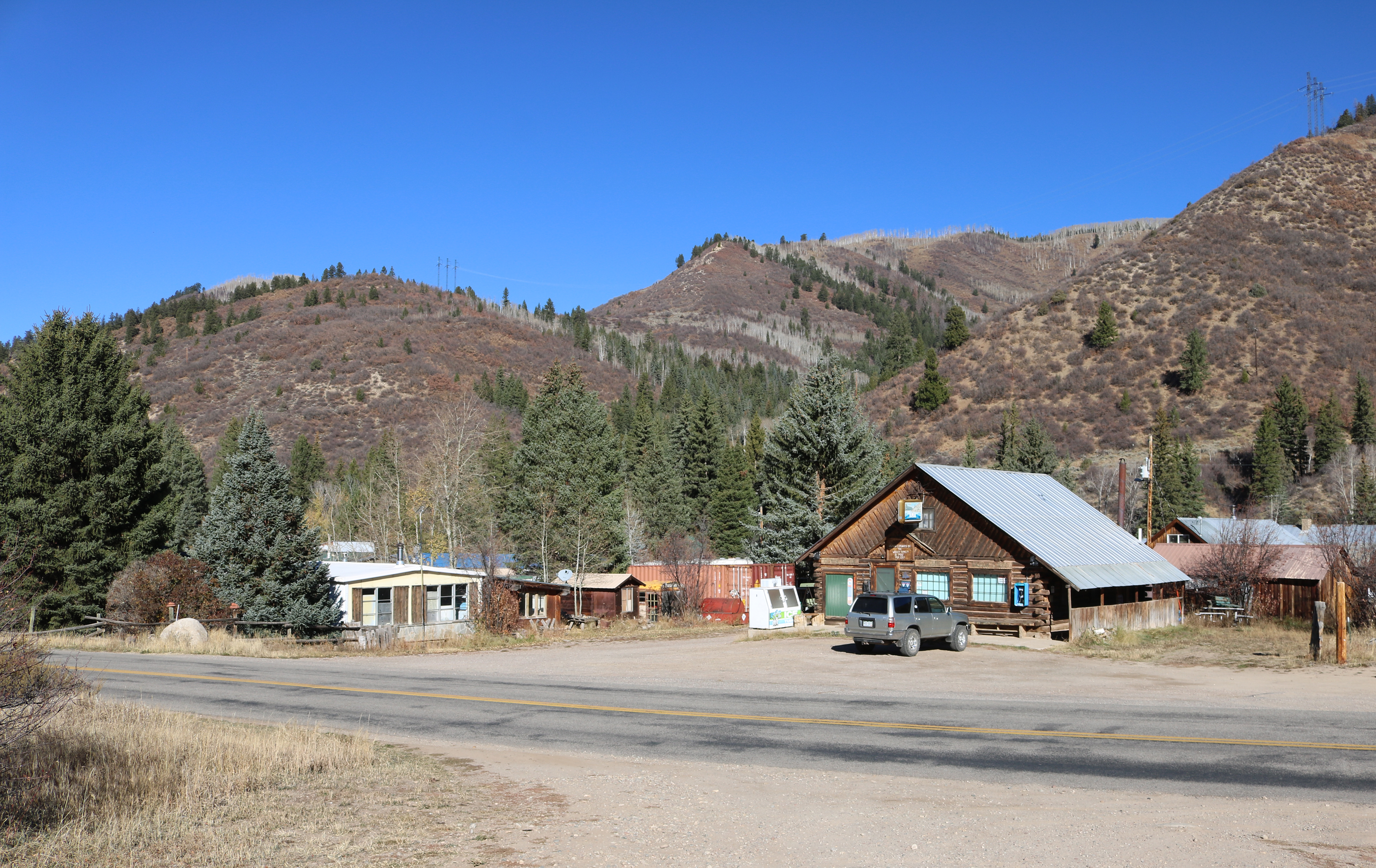
- A view of Meredith from across Frying Pan Road

- Location in Pitkin County and the state of Colorado Meredith, Colorado (the United States)
- Coordinates: 39°21′47″N 106°43′48″W
- Country: United States
- State: Colorado
- County: Pitkin
- Elevation: 7,773 ft (2,369 m)
- Time zone: UTC-7 (MST)
  - Summer (DST): UTC-6 (MDT)
- ZIP code: 81642
- GNIS feature ID: 179732

Meredith is an unincorporated community and a U.S. Post Office in Pitkin County, Colorado, United States. The Meredith Post Office has the ZIP Code 81642.

Meredith was a limestone quarry town as well as a lumber camp in the 1890s. It is now mainly a "resort area". There are many original occupied buildings.

== Climate ==
Climate data for Meredith, Colorado, 1991–2020 normals: 7825ft (2385m)
Month	Jan	Feb	Mar	Apr	May	Jun	Jul	Aug	Sep	Oct	Nov	Dec	Year
Record high °F (°C)	58 (14)	59 (15)	65 (18)	75 (24)	89 (32)	91 (33)	98 (37)	93 (34)	90 (32)	80 (27)	68 (20)	59 (15)	98 (37)
Mean maximum °F (°C)	48 (9)	50 (10)	56 (13)	66 (19)	76 (24)	85 (29)	89 (32)	87 (31)	83 (28)	73 (23)	60 (16)	50 (10)	92 (33)
Mean daily maximum °F (°C)	34.1 (1.2)	35.7 (2.1)	42.9 (6.1)	51.0 (10.6)	62.9 (17.2)	74.5 (23.6)	81.1 (27.3)	79.7 (26.5)	71.2 (21.8)	61.1 (16.2)	44.6 (7.0)	33.7 (0.9)	56.0 (13.4)
Daily mean °F (°C)	18.8 (−7.3)	20.7 (−6.3)	28.1 (−2.2)	35.8 (2.1)	45.6 (7.6)	54.3 (12.4)	60.4 (15.8)	59.4 (15.2)	51.6 (10.9)	42.2 (5.7)	28.9 (−1.7)	19.2 (−7.1)	38.7 (3.8)
Mean daily minimum °F (°C)	3.5 (−15.8)	5.7 (−14.6)	13.2 (−10.4)	20.6 (−6.3)	28.4 (−2.0)	34.1 (1.2)	39.7 (4.3)	39.1 (3.9)	31.9 (−0.1)	23.3 (−4.8)	13.2 (−10.4)	4.7 (−15.2)	21.5 (−5.8)
Mean minimum °F (°C)	−17 (−27)	−16 (−27)	−7 (−22)	7 (−14)	17 (−8)	25 (−4)	31 (−1)	31 (−1)	21 (−6)	11 (−12)	−7 (−22)	−15 (−26)	−22 (−30)
Record low °F (°C)	−29 (−34)	−38 (−39)	−30 (−34)	−7 (−22)	6 (−14)	17 (−8)	23 (−5)	23 (−5)	12 (−11)	−5 (−21)	−21 (−29)	−35 (−37)	−38 (−39)
Average precipitation inches (mm)	1.50 (38)	1.57 (40)	1.85 (47)	2.15 (55)	1.87 (47)	1.05 (27)	1.70 (43)	1.65 (42)	1.97 (50)	1.71 (43)	1.53 (39)	1.15 (29)	19.7 (500)
Average snowfall inches (cm)	19.0 (48)	14.6 (37)	11.6 (29)	7.7 (20)	1.9 (4.8)	0.0 (0.0)	0.0 (0.0)	0.0 (0.0)	0.2 (0.51)	3.4 (8.6)	10.5 (27)	19.1 (49)	88 (223.91)
Source 1: NOAA
Source 2: XMACIS (records & monthly max/mins & Basalt precip/snowfall)

== See also ==
- Protected areas of Colorado
