= Hunter–Fryingpan Wilderness =

Protected area in Colorado, US

Hunter-Fryingpan Wilderness
- IUCN category Ib (wilderness area)
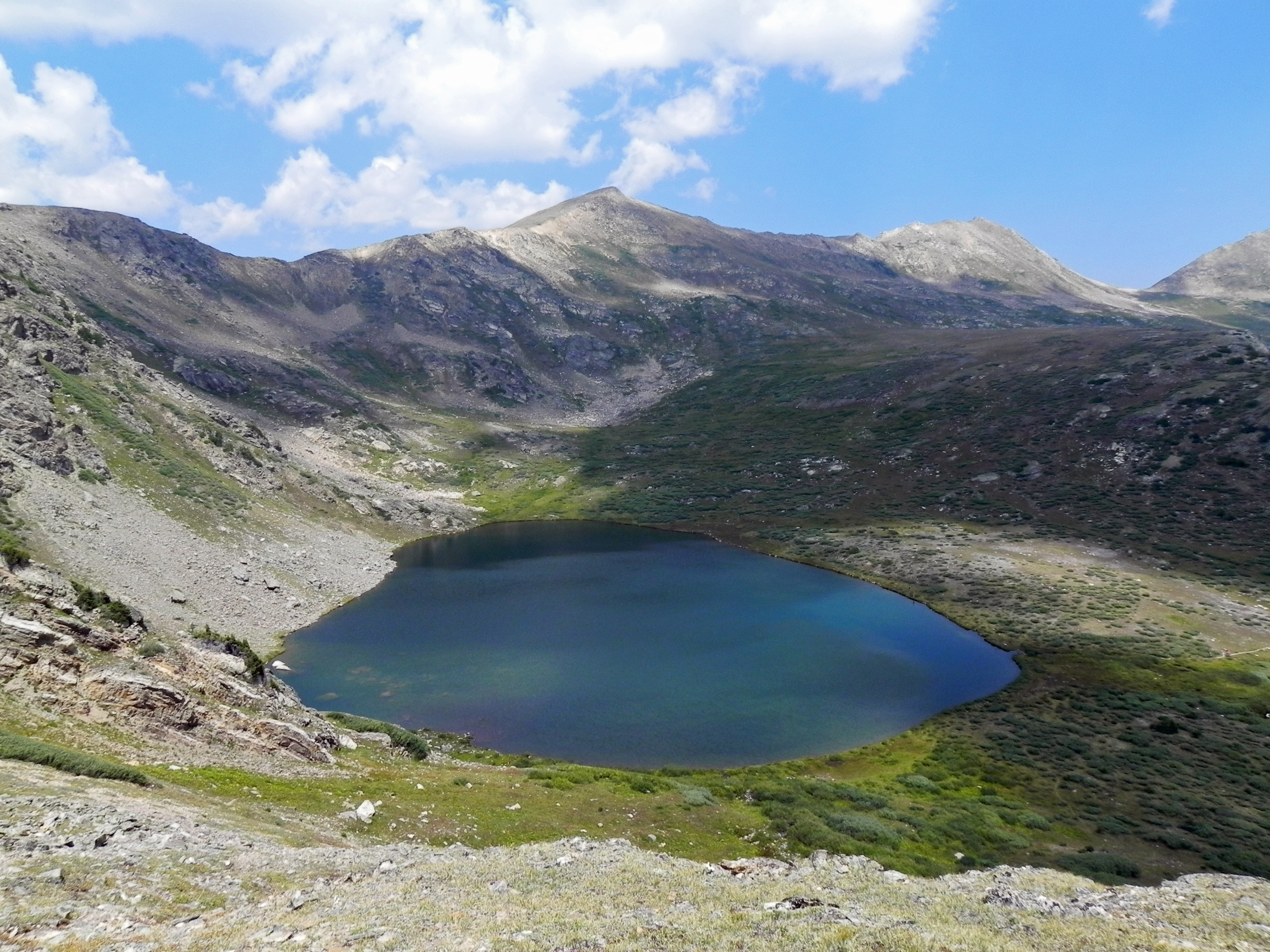
- Linkins Lake in the Hunter-Fryingpan Wilderness

- Location within Colorado Location within the United States
- Location: Pitkin County, Colorado, United States
- Nearest city: Aspen, CO
- Coordinates: 39°12′00″N 106°37′00″W
- Area: 82,026 acres (331.95 km^{2})
- Established: 1978
- Governing body: U.S. Forest Service

The Hunter–Fryingpan Wilderness is a U.S. Wilderness Area located in White River National Forest east of Aspen, Colorado. The 82,026-acre (331.95 km^{2}) wilderness established in 1978 includes the headwaters of Hunter Creek and the Fryingpan River plus many peaks of the Williams Mountains. It borders on the Mount Massive Wilderness to the east, separated only by the continental divide. There are 50 miles (80 km) of trails in the wilderness area.

== Photo gallery ==
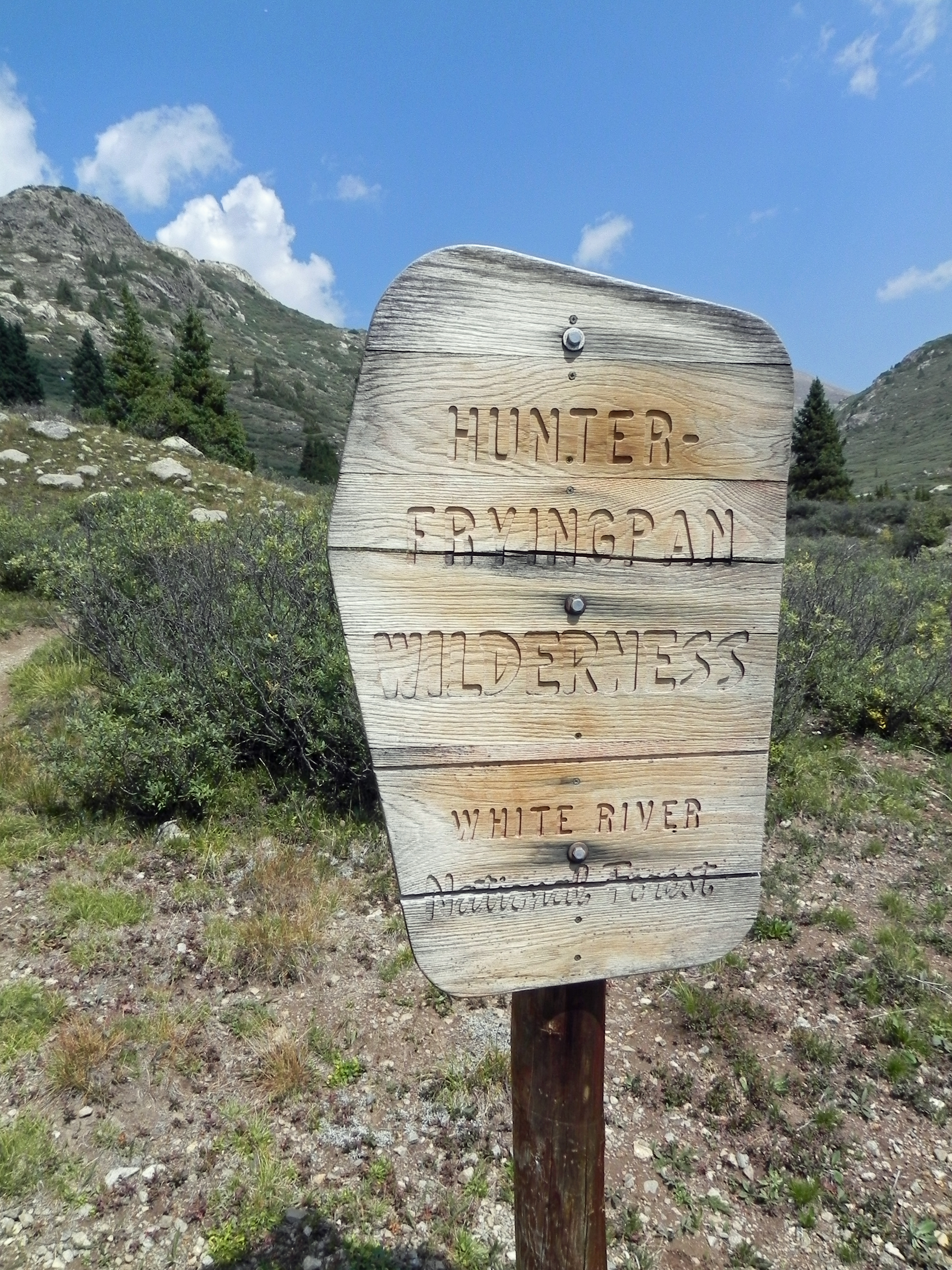
Wilderness sign

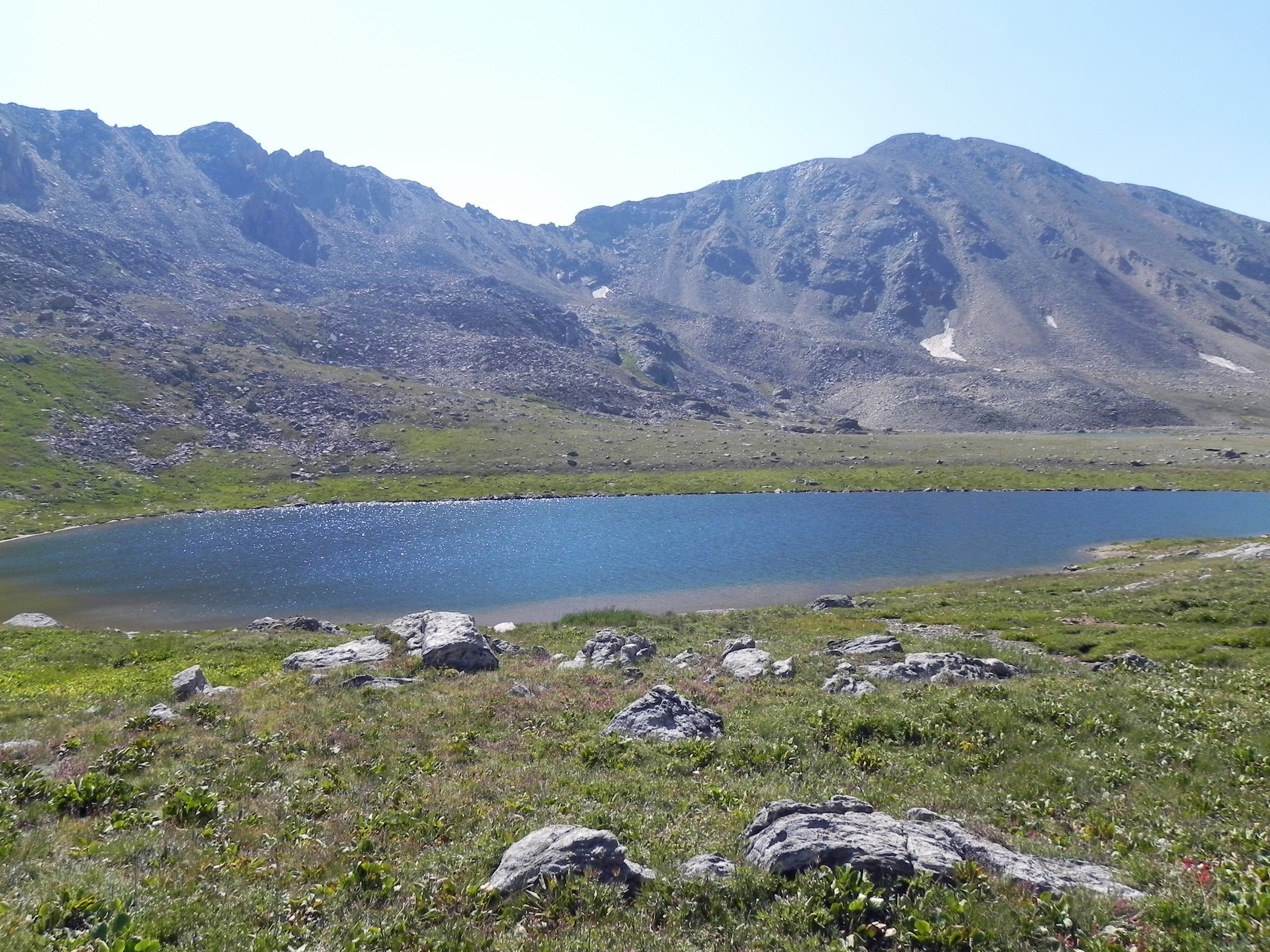
Independence Lake

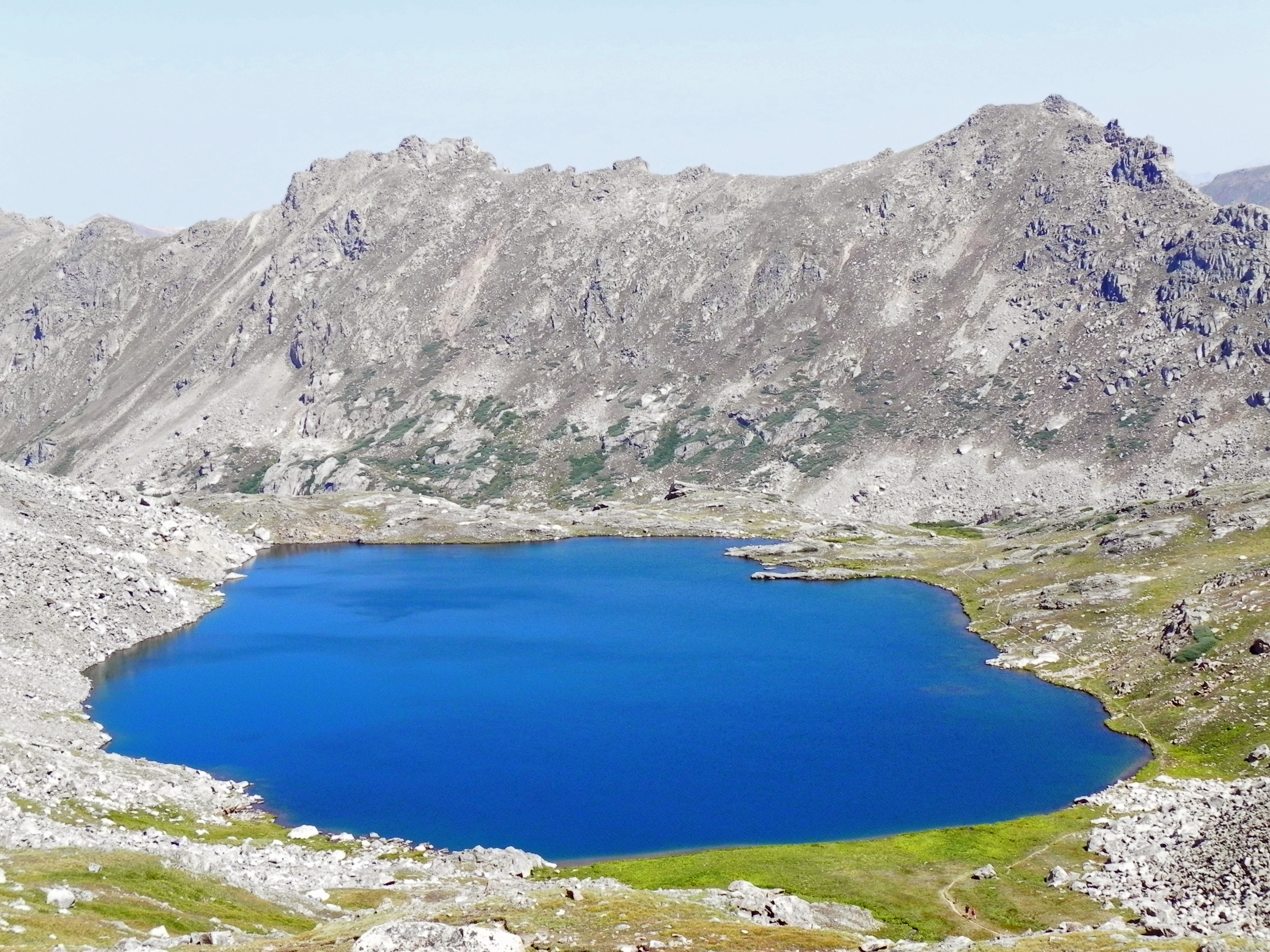
Lost Man Lake
