= Pitkin County, Colorado =

County in Colorado, United States

- County
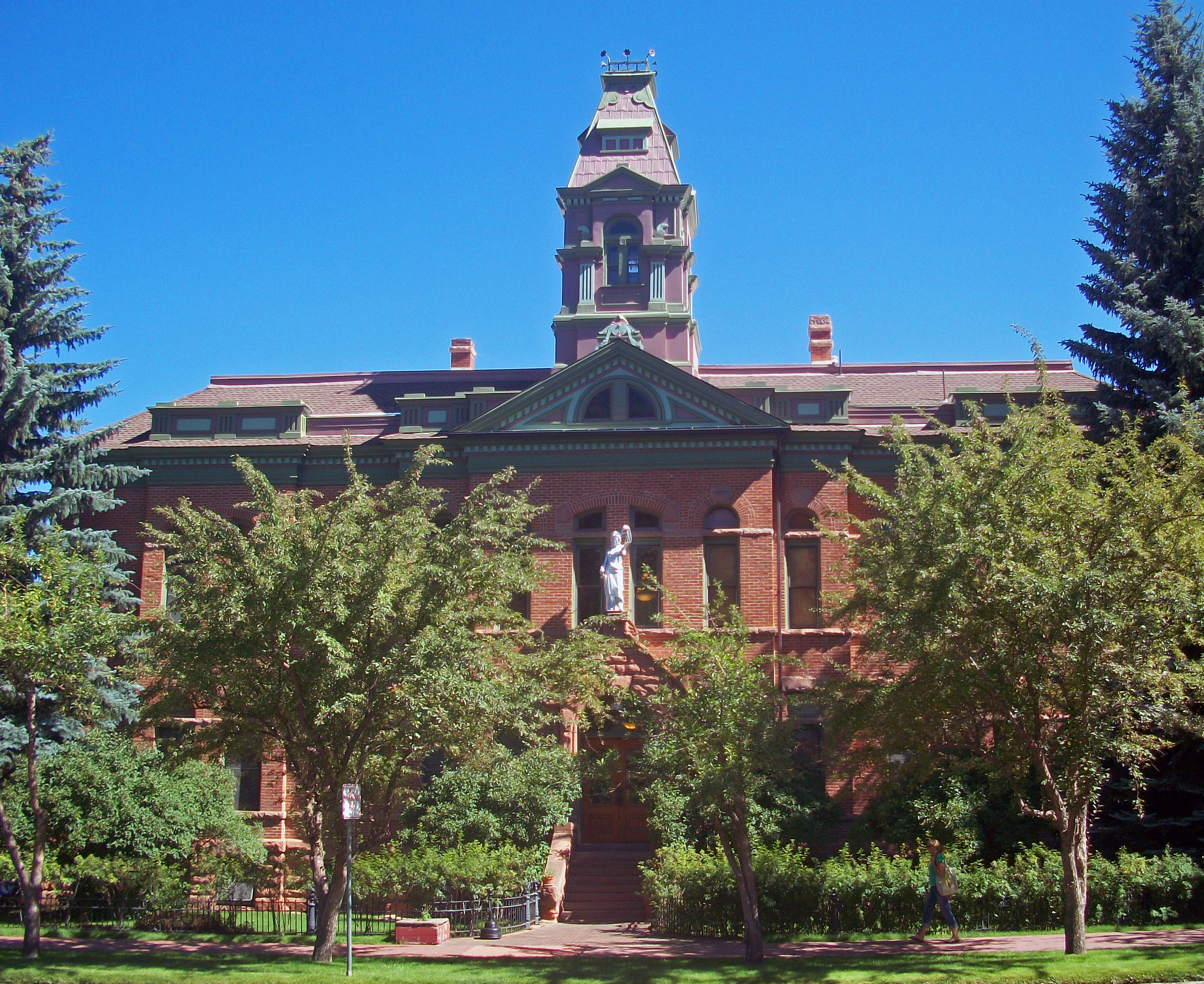
- Pitkin County Courthouse

- Location within the U.S. state of Colorado
- Coordinates: 39.22°N 106.92°W
- Country: United States
- State: Colorado
- Founded: February 23, 1881
- Named for: Frederick Walker Pitkin
- Seat: Aspen
- Largest city: Aspen

Area
  - Total: 973 sq mi (2,520 km^{2})
  - Land: 971 sq mi (2,510 km^{2})
  - Water: 2.5 sq mi (6.5 km^{2}) 0.3%

Population (2020)
  - Total: 17,358
  - Estimate (2025): 16,625 ▼
  - Density: 17.9/sq mi (6.90/km^{2})
- Time zone: UTC−7 (Mountain)
  - Summer (DST): UTC−6 (MDT)
- Congressional district: 3rd
- Website: www.pitkincounty.com

Pitkin County is a county in the U.S. state of Colorado. As of the 2020 census, the population was 17,358. The county seat and largest city is Aspen. The county is named for Colorado Governor Frederick Walker Pitkin. Pitkin County is included in the Glenwood Springs Micropolitan Statistical Area, which is also included in the Edwards-Glenwood Springs Combined Statistical Area.

== Geography ==
According to the U.S. Census Bureau, the county has an area of 973 square miles (2,520 km^{2}), of which 971 sq mi (2,510 km^{2}) is land and 2.5 sq mi (6.5 km^{2}) (0.3%) is water. The county's highest point is Castle Peak, a fourteener with a height of 14,265 feet (4,348 m). It is 20 miles (32 km) south of Aspen on the Gunnison County border.

=== Adjacent counties ===
- Eagle County – northeast
- Lake County – east
- Chaffee County – southeast
- Gunnison County – south
- Mesa County – west
- Garfield County – northwest

=== Major highways ===
- State Highway 82
- State Highway 133

=== National protected areas ===
- White River National Forest
- Collegiate Peaks Wilderness
- Holy Cross Wilderness
- Hunter-Fryingpan Wilderness
- Maroon Bells-Snowmass Wilderness

=== Trails and byways ===
- American Discovery Trail
- Continental Divide National Scenic Trail
- West Elk Loop Scenic Byway

== Demographics ==
Historical population
Census	Pop.	Note	%±
1890	8,929		—
1900	7,020		−21.4%
1910	4,566		−35.0%
1920	2,707		−40.7%
1930	1,770		−34.6%
1940	1,836		3.7%
1950	1,643		−10.5%
1960	2,381		44.9%
1970	6,185		159.8%
1980	10,338		67.1%
1990	12,661		22.5%
2000	14,872		17.5%
2010	17,148		15.3%
2020	17,358		1.2%
2025 (est.)	16,625	▼	−4.2%
U.S. Decennial Census; 1790-1960 1900-1990; 1990-2000 2010-2020

=== 2020 census ===
As of the 2020 census, the county had a population of 17,358. Of the residents, 16.6% were under the age of 18 and 18.5% were 65 years of age or older; the median age was 43.0 years. For every 100 females there were 105.8 males, and for every 100 females age 18 and over there were 106.6 males. 67.0% of residents lived in urban areas and 33.0% lived in rural areas.

Pitkin County, Colorado – Racial and ethnic composition Note: the US Census treats Hispanic/Latino as an ethnic category. This table excludes Latinos from the racial categories and assigns them to a separate category. Hispanics/Latinos may be of any race.
Race / Ethnicity (NH = Non-Hispanic)	Pop 2000	Pop 2010	Pop 2020	% 2000	% 2010	% 2020
White alone (NH)	13,479	15,067	14,433	90.63%	87.86%	83.15%
Black or African American alone (NH)	55	82	94	0.37%	0.48%	0.54%
Native American or Alaska Native alone (NH)	35	25	36	0.24%	0.15%	0.21%
Asian alone (NH)	161	204	280	1.08%	1.19%	1.61%
Pacific Islander alone (NH)	6	10	7	0.04%	0.06%	0.04%
Other race alone (NH)	20	15	82	0.13%	0.09%	0.47%
Mixed race or Multiracial (NH)	143	184	534	0.96%	1.07%	3.08%
Hispanic or Latino (any race)	973	1,561	1,892	6.54%	9.10%	10.90%
Total	14,872	17,148	17,358	100.00%	100.00%	100.00%

The racial makeup of the county was 85.2% White, 0.6% Black or African American, 0.4% American Indian and Alaska Native, 1.7% Asian, 0.1% Native Hawaiian and Pacific Islander, 4.8% from some other race, and 7.1% from two or more races. Hispanic or Latino residents of any race comprised 10.9% of the population.

There were 8,027 households in the county, of which 23.2% had children under the age of 18 living with them and 25.8% had a female householder with no spouse or partner present. About 35.2% of all households were made up of individuals and 10.9% had someone living alone who was 65 years of age or older.

There were 13,245 housing units, of which 39.4% were vacant. Among occupied housing units, 60.1% were owner-occupied and 39.9% were renter-occupied. The homeowner vacancy rate was 1.9% and the rental vacancy rate was 11.2%.

=== 2000 census ===
As of the census of 2000, there were 14,872 people, 6,807 households, and 3,185 families living in the county. The population density was 15 people per square mile (5.8 people/km^{2}). There were 10,096 housing units at an average density of 10 units per square mile (3.9 units/km^{2}). The racial makeup of the county was 94.33% White, 0.53% Black or African American, 0.27% Native American, 1.12% Asian, 0.04% Pacific Islander, 2.37% from other races, and 1.34% from two or more races. Of the population, 6.54% were Hispanic or Latino of any race.

There were 6,807 households, out of which 21.10% had children under the age of 18 living with them, 38.70% were married couples living together, 5.30% had a female householder with no husband present, and 53.20% were non-families. Of all households, 35.80% were made up of individuals, and 3.50% had someone living alone who was 65 years of age or older. The average household size was 2.14 and the average family size was 2.77.

In the county, the population was spread out, with 16.70% under the age of 18, 7.70% from 18 to 24, 38.30% from 25 to 44, 30.50% from 45 to 64, and 6.80% who were 65 years of age or older. The median age was 38 years. For every 100 females, there were 115.10 males. For every 100 females age 18 and over, there were 117.40 males.

The median income for a household in the county was $59,375, and the median income for a family was $75,048. Males had a median income of $40,672 versus $33,896 for females. The per capita income for the county was $40,811. About 3.00% of families and 6.20% of the population were below the poverty line, including 4.40% of those under age 18 and 5.60% of those age 65 or over.

== Life expectancy ==
According to a report in the Journal of the American Medical Association, residents of Pitkin County had a 2014 life expectancy of 86.52 years, the second-longest in the nation. Both men and women live longer in Pitkin County than nearly every other county in the United States. The life expectancy at birth is 85.2 years for men and 88.0 years for women. Two contiguous counties, Summit and Eagle counties, rank first and third in the nation respectively in life expectancy.

Factors contributing to the high life expectancy in Pitkin County are "high education, high income, high access to medical care, the people are physically active, obesity is lower than anywhere else—so you're doing it right", said Ali Mokdad, one of the study's co-authors.

In June 2021, U.S. News & World Report ranked the county with the nation's fourth-best life expectancy, at 93.4 years.

== Communities ==
=== City ===
- Aspen

=== Towns ===
- Basalt
- Snowmass Village

=== Census-designated places ===
- Norrie
- Redstone
- Woody Creek

=== Other unincorporated communities ===
- Buttermilk
- Emma
- Meredith
- Snowmass
- Wingo

=== Ghost towns ===
- Ashcroft
- Independence
- Lenado

== Politics ==
Pitkin County favored the Republican nominee in the 1884 and 1888 presidential elections, but in 1892 supported the Populist nominee, James B. Weaver, when Democratic nominee Grover Cleveland wasn't on the ballot in Colorado. Pitkin County favored the Democratic nominees from 1896 to 1916, voting for them in every election in that period, and being one of the few Western counties to support Alton B. Parker in 1904. From 1920, Pitkin County followed national trends until being narrowly carried by losing candidate Thomas E. Dewey in 1944. Pitkin was largely Republican-leaning until the growing ski resort community drew its residents to the liberal George McGovern – rejected by a majority of the electorates of all but 129 other counties – in 1972. Like many ski destination counties, since 1988 Pitkin has turned heavily Democratic. The last Republican to carry the county was Ronald Reagan in 1984. George H. W. Bush was the last Republican to gain even a third of Pitkin County's vote since then. Joe Biden's performance in the 2020 election was the best by a Democrat in the county since 1900.

In this modern era, Pitkin has also frequently been one of the leading counties for third-party candidates, being the fourth-best county in the nation for Eugene McCarthy in 1976 and the third-best for John B. Anderson in 1980.

United States presidential election results for Pitkin County, Colorado
Year	Republican		Democratic		Third party(ies)	
Year	No.	%	No.	%	No.	%
1884	605	55.81%	479	44.19%	0	0.00%
1888	1,524	54.82%	1,217	43.78%	39	1.40%
1892	445	13.69%	0	0.00%	2,805	86.31%
1896	27	0.71%	3,763	98.97%	12	0.32%
1900	458	16.43%	2,305	82.71%	24	0.86%
1904	922	40.21%	1,120	48.84%	251	10.95%
1908	531	27.74%	1,262	65.94%	121	6.32%
1912	208	15.53%	770	57.51%	361	26.96%
1916	263	20.50%	915	71.32%	105	8.18%
1920	478	49.38%	417	43.08%	73	7.54%
1924	442	47.27%	204	21.82%	289	30.91%
1928	485	50.95%	454	47.69%	13	1.37%
1932	239	23.62%	727	71.84%	46	4.55%
1936	305	29.99%	659	64.80%	53	5.21%
1940	484	48.50%	503	50.40%	11	1.10%
1944	368	50.83%	355	49.03%	1	0.14%
1948	319	42.48%	409	54.46%	23	3.06%
1952	556	64.13%	309	35.64%	2	0.23%
1956	550	62.15%	334	37.74%	1	0.11%
1960	679	58.18%	488	41.82%	0	0.00%
1964	540	35.90%	958	63.70%	6	0.40%
1968	1,135	56.16%	728	36.02%	158	7.82%
1972	2,064	44.16%	2,531	54.15%	79	1.69%
1976	2,955	53.61%	2,194	39.80%	363	6.59%
1980	2,153	39.75%	1,760	32.49%	1,504	27.76%
1984	3,117	56.39%	2,293	41.48%	118	2.13%
1988	2,801	44.28%	3,420	54.06%	105	1.66%
1992	1,686	22.57%	3,820	51.14%	1,963	26.28%
1996	1,969	28.19%	3,949	56.54%	1,067	15.28%
2000	2,565	32.88%	4,137	53.04%	1,098	14.08%
2004	2,784	30.08%	6,335	68.44%	137	1.48%
2008	2,484	24.92%	7,349	73.74%	133	1.33%
2012	3,024	30.01%	6,849	67.98%	202	2.00%
2016	2,550	24.23%	7,333	69.69%	640	6.08%
2020	2,780	23.25%	8,989	75.18%	188	1.57%
2024	2,992	26.79%	7,932	71.02%	245	2.19%

United States Senate election results for Pitkin County, Colorado2
Year	Republican		Democratic		Third party(ies)	
Year	No.	%	No.	%	No.	%
2020	2,935	24.75%	8,761	73.88%	163	1.37%

United States Senate election results for Pitkin County, Colorado3
Year	Republican		Democratic		Third party(ies)	
Year	No.	%	No.	%	No.	%
2022	2,281	23.81%	7,157	74.70%	143	1.49%

Colorado Gubernatorial election results for Pitkin County
Year	Republican		Democratic		Third party(ies)	
Year	No.	%	No.	%	No.	%
2022	1,907	19.91%	7,565	79.00%	104	1.09%

== Education ==
There are two school districts with different portions of the county: Aspen School District 1 and Roaring Fork School District RE-1.

== See also ==
- Bibliography of Colorado
- Geography of Colorado
- History of Colorado
  - Hunter S. Thompson
  - National Register of Historic Places listings in Pitkin County, Colorado
- Index of Colorado-related articles
- List of Colorado-related lists
  - List of counties in Colorado
  - List of statistical areas in Colorado
- Outline of Colorado
  - Roaring Fork Transportation Authority
