= Aspen Snowmass =

Winter resort complex

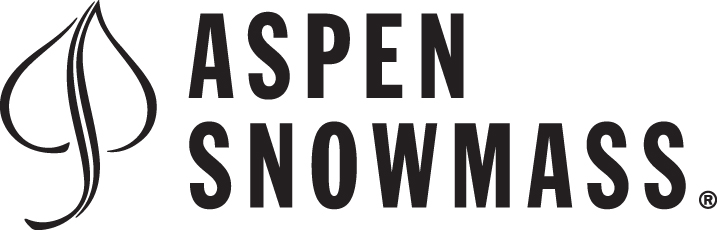
Aspen Snowmass stacked logo

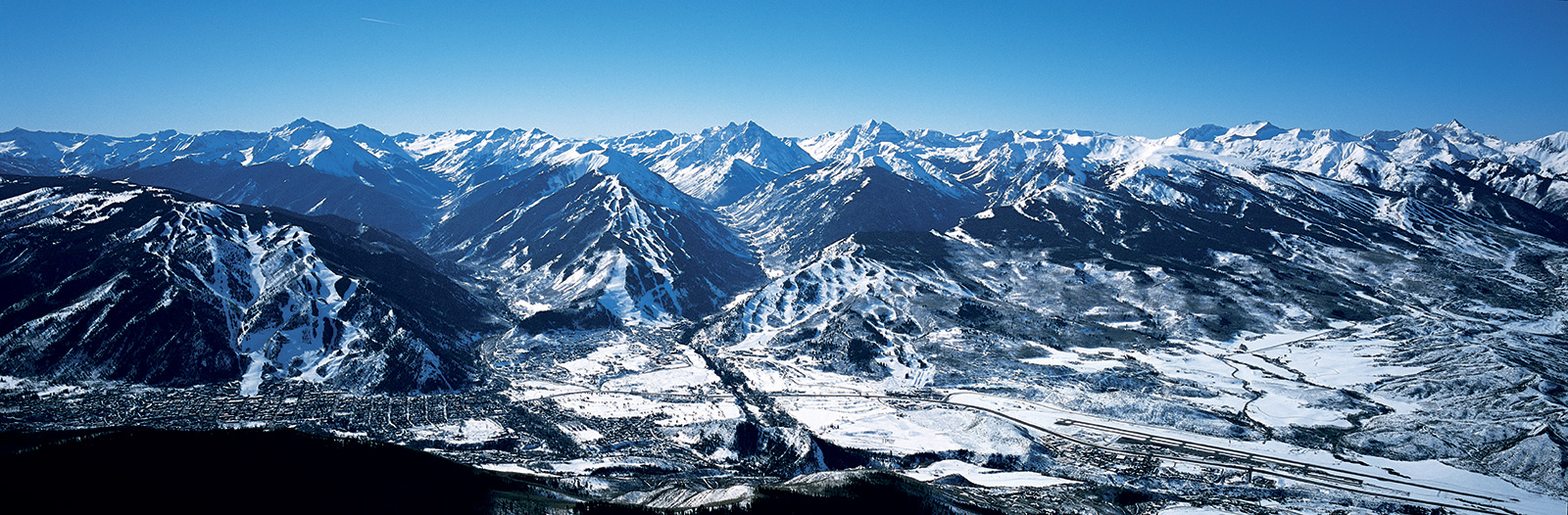
All four Aspen Snowmass resorts (Aspen Mountain, Aspen Highlands, Buttermilk, and Snowmass) from the air.

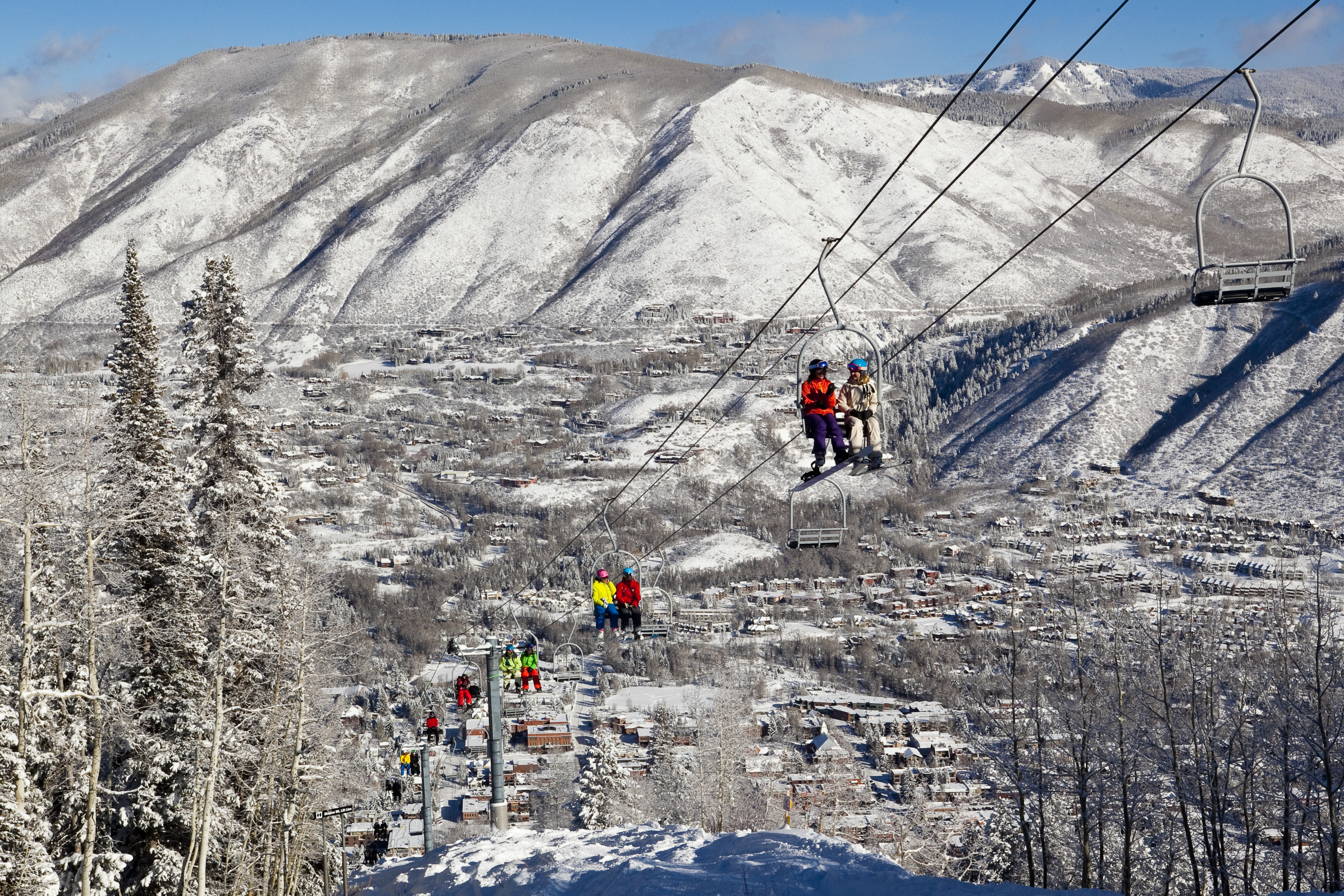
Skiers and snowboarders ride up the iconic Lift 1A on Aspen Mountain with downtown Aspen in the background.

Aspen Snowmass is a winter resort complex located in Pitkin County in western Colorado in the United States. Owned and operated by the Aspen Skiing Company it comprises four skiing/snowboarding areas on four adjacent mountains in the vicinity of the towns of Aspen and Snowmass Village. The four areas collectively form one of the most famous winter resorts in the world and are annually the destination for visitors from all over the world.

The four ski areas of the complex are:

- Aspen Mountain, the oldest of the four areas, located on Bell Mountain and the Aspen Mountain above the town of Aspen.
- Aspen Highlands, located on Highland Peak and Loge Peak just north of Aspen.
- Buttermilk, a low elevation family-oriented ski area just north of Aspen Highlands, but also known for its world class terrain park, host of the X Games.
- Snowmass, the largest of the four areas (bigger than the other three combined), located near Snowmass Village.
