= Whip Jones =

American entrepreneur and ski industry pioneer

Whipple Van Ness Jones
- Born: November 8, 1909; Oconomowoc, Wisconsin
- Died: June 29, 2001 (aged 91); Tallahassee, Florida
- Other name: Whip
- Occupations: ski industry pioneer; founder; developer
- Title: founder of Aspen Highlands

Whipple Van Ness "Whip" Jones (November 8, 1909 – June 29, 2001) was a ski industry pioneer, founder, developer and the original operator for 35 years, of the Aspen Highlands ski area in Aspen, Colorado. Whip Jones and the company he founded, Aspen Highlands, won a US Supreme Court case against his rival, the Aspen Skiing Company. Jones was also a philanthropist, and was inducted into The Colorado Ski Hall of Fame and The Aspen Hall of Fame for his work with Aspen Highlands.

== Early years ==
Jones was born in Oconomowoc, Wisconsin, to Esther Olin Whipple (1884–1977) and Frank William Jones I (1876–1936). While enrolled at Oconomowoc, he won two doubles tennis state championships (1926-1927). He was a 1932 graduate of Harvard University.

== Founder of Aspen Highlands ==
Jones was the builder and the owner of the Aspen Highlands, one of the four ski areas of Aspen, Colorado.

Jones started the project on his own, and laid out a well-balanced set of ski runs: 25% beginner, 50% intermediate, 25% advanced. Jones financed the project by selling the lumber from the cleared ski runs and using low cost labor. The base area of Highlands Mountain is located 1 1/2 miles from the village of Aspen.

== Supreme Court antitrust case ==
Throughout his ownership, Aspen Highlands and founder Jones remained at odds with the local rival Aspen Skiing Company, which owned and operated the three other ski areas Aspen Mountain (Ajax), Buttermilk and Snowmass in Aspen, with Jones owning the remaining independent ski area, Aspen Highlands. In 1979, Jones sued the Aspen Skiing Company, alleging violations of the Sherman Act. Aspen Highlands and Aspen Skiing had, for several years, cooperated to sell an "all-Aspen" ticket that allowed a skier to visit Aspen Skiing's three mountains and Aspen Highlands. However, the rival companies were unable to agree on a means to administer this program and distribute proceeds. In 1978, Aspen Skiing decided to discontinue the all-Aspen ticket, and to instead sell only the ticket to the three Aspen Skiing mountains. Aspen Skiing also refused to sell Aspen Highlands any lift tickets to the Aspen Skiing mountains (even at full price), thereby preventing Aspen Highlands from offering its own multi-mountain package. The issue made it to the US Supreme Court and was decided as 472 U.S. 585 (1985) with Jones winning over $10 million in treble damages.

== Death ==
On June 29, 2001 he died in Tallahassee, Florida.

== Harvard endowment ==
Jones donated the Highlands to Harvard University in 1992. The $18.3 million gift remains one of the largest donations the University has ever received. The proceeds endow the "Whipple V.N. Jones Cornerstone Scholarship Fund" and the "Whipple V.N. Jones Professor of Economics Chair" once held by Andrei Shleifer and currently held by Xiao-Li Meng.

== See also ==
- Aspen Highlands
- Aspen Skiing Company
