= Betty Haas Pfister =

American aviator (1921–2011)

Elizabeth Haas Pfister
- Born: Elizabeth Haas; July 23, 1921; Great Neck, New York, U.S.
- Died: November 17, 2011 (aged 90); Aspen, Colorado, U.S.
- Occupation: Aviator
- Spouse: Art Pfister
- Children: 3, including Nancy Pfister
- Family: Kalman Haas (grandfather)

Elizabeth Haas Pfister (née Haas; July 23, 1921 – November 17, 2011) was an American aviator.

== Biography ==
Haas Pfister was born Elizabeth Haas in Great Neck, New York, the second of three children of Merle (née Simon) and Robert Kalman Haas Sr. (son of California retailer Kalman Haas). She expressed an interest in aviation from an early age, and she began taking flying lessons while attending Bennington College in Vermont. By the time she graduated (early, with a degree in marine biology), she had enough flight hours to be a candidate to join the Women Airforce Service Pilots.

As a member of WASP, starting in 1943, she flew military aircraft within the United States, ferrying them from factory to airfield or airfield to port. Like other WASP members, she also assisted with aerial target practice, towing airborne targets, and flew test flights.

After World War II ended, Haas Pfister purchased (for $750) a decommissioned Bell P-39 Airacobra fighter plane. The plane, with serial number 44-2433, never saw combat during the war. Haas Pfister named it "Galloping Gertie", painted it red and white, and used it in races and exhibitions. The plane was loaned to the Smithsonian Institution in 1950, with the donation becoming permanent in 1956. In her racing career, Haas Pfister twice won the All Women's International Air Race, in 1950 and 1952.

In her later career, Haas Pfister undertook a number of aviation endeavors. After the war, she worked for Pan American Airways as a stewardess and served as an aviation instructor. She started flying other aircraft like gliders and balloons, and in 1953, she earned her helicopter license, the 52nd American woman to do so. She competed with the U.S. Helicopter Team in the 1973 and 1978 world championships and later served as a judge.

Haas Pfister advocated for upgrades to the Aspen–Pitkin County Airport that allowed it to accommodate major commercial traffic. She supervised the construction of the Aspen Valley Hospital Heliport. She also helped found the Pitkin County Air Rescue Group, flying numerous rescue missions in the mountains. She founded the Aspen chapter of the Ninety-Nines International Organization of Women Pilots and the Snowmass, Colorado, Balloon Festival.

== Awards and honors ==
Haas Pfister was inducted into the Colorado Aviation Hall of Fame in 1984. The National Aeronautic Association gave her the Katharine Wright Memorial Award in 1992 and the Elder Statesman of Aviation Award in 1994. Whirly-Girls International, which she served as president from 1985–1987, gave her their Livingston Award in 1995.

In 2010, Haas Pfister was in attendance when the members of WASP, as a group, were awarded the Congressional Gold Medal.

== Personal life ==
Haas Pfister married Arthur Pfister in 1954; he died in 2008. They had three children: Suzanne Pfister Jensen, Christina Pfister Smith, and Nancy Pfister.
