= Temerity =

Section of the Aspen Highlands ski area, Colorado

Temerity is a section of steep, gladed skiing terrain at Aspen Highlands, one of the four mountains owned and operated by the Aspen Skiing Company in Aspen, Colorado. "Boldness, to the point of being foolish," Temerity is designated as double-diamond experts-only terrain. Skiers and snowboarders should be practiced in tree skiing and aware of the dangers involved, and comfortable on experts-only mogul skiing runs such as Steeplechase before attempting.

== Location ==
Temerity encompasses all the terrain between the Steeplechase runs and the Highlands Bowl - that is, between Kessler's and the Y-Zones. Temerity is serviced by the Loge Peak and Deep Temerity lifts. From the top of these head south (further up the mountain), either along the Dorksacker traverse through the trees or along the ridge that defines the top of the mountain. Drop in anywhere in the forest, and you are skiing in Temerity. Entering from the ridge affords the opportunity of skiing the area above the traverse, which is often untracked. The ridge can be hiked, but a complimentary snowcat also runs along it to the edge of the Temerity forest. The snowcat picks up only a hundred yards from the top of Loge Peak lift and picks up every twenty minutes from 10:30am until 2:30pm, weather and conditions permitting.

== The Runs ==
Temerity is remarkable for the sheer length and constantly steep pitch of its gladed runs. The shortest runs drop about 1690 vertical feet. The terrain includes glades of varying density, former avalanche chutes, and steep open clearings. The main runs are - in order from North to South - Lucky Find, South Castle, Mushroom, Canopy Cruiser, and Hyde Park.

== History ==
The Temerity area has been inside the Aspen Highlands permit area boundary since that permit was first granted in 1958, and even back then it was clear that the forest near Loge Peak would make for excellent steep tree skiing if it could be done safely. The principal issue was the safety of the dangerous avalanche chutes cutting through the forest, which would have to be controlled before commercial skiers could traffic the area. Also, the forest is in many places too dense for most skiers and would have to be thinned out.

Hope came for the actualization of opening Temerity in the 77-78 season, when the natural avalanche chutes of Steeplechase opened. Steeplechase was made safe by a bootpacking program whereby hikers were paid to march up and down the slopes, mashing down the early-season snow so it would hold throughout the season. Constant skier traffic effectively mashed down the subsequent layers of snow so that avalanche conditions would never be reached.

However, due to the expense associated with opening it, Temerity was not to be opened for another eighteen years. The tree removal was an expensive process, as the trees had to be removed by helicopter so as not to damage rest of the forest. Finally, before the 95-96 season the bootpacking and tree removal were accomplished, and Temerity was open.

Initially, however, the runs were much shorter than they are now because no lift serviced the area. A long catwalk called the OK traverse brought skiers back to Steeplechase's Grand Traverse, which brought them back to the bottom of Loge Peak lift. That unfortunate arrangement changed in the 05-06 season with the opening of the Deep Temerity lift, which approximately doubled the length of the Temerity and Steeplechase runs, allowing skiers to ski much more terrain and traverse much less. Deep Temerity, a triple chair that rises 1,690 ft (515 m)., also makes much more of the Highlands Bowl accessible. The opening of Deep Temerity was a landmark event for the Aspen Skiing Company because it opened up so much experts-only terrain, and it hoped to establish Aspen as a center for extreme skiing. Posters were issued with the slogan, "Aspen Goes Deep."

== Environmental impact ==
The opening of Temerity has disrupted the natural functioning of the avalanche chutes that cut through the forest. Powerful avalanches would rip through the chutes periodically, destroying trees on the edges of the chutes and at the bottom. Now that the avalanches have stopped, trees have begun to grow closer into the chutes.
