= Aspen Highlands =

Ski area in Colorado, United States

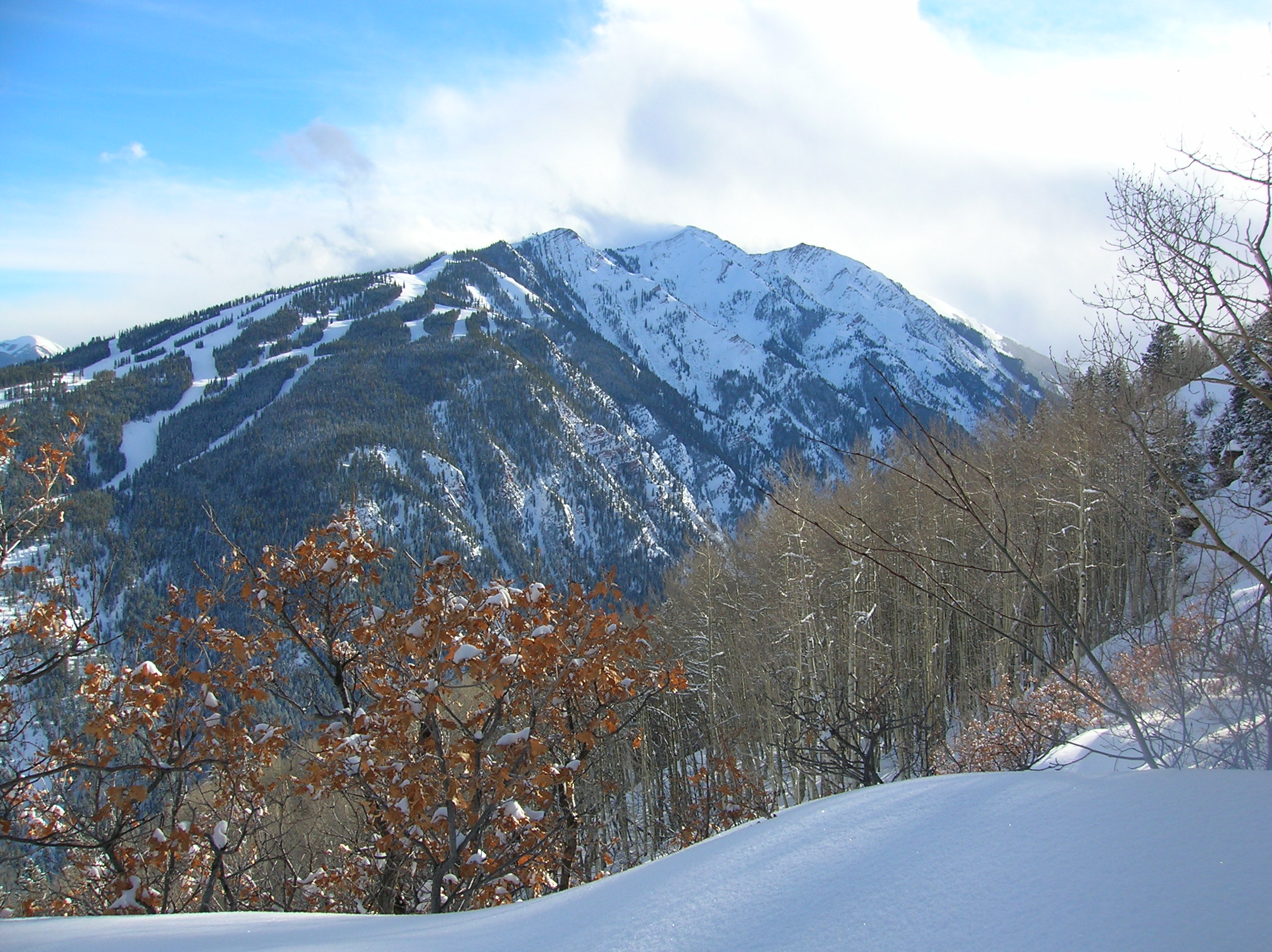
- Summit of Aspen Highlands and the backside of the Highland Bowl from Buttermilk Mountain

- Location in Colorado Aspen Highlands (the United States)
- Location: Pitkin County, Colorado, United States
- Nearest major city: Aspen, Colorado
- Coordinates: 39°10′52″N 106°51′23″W
- Status: Operating
- Owner: Aspen Skiing Company
- Vertical: 3,638 feet (1,109 m)
- Top elevation: 12,392 feet (3,777 m)
- Base elevation: 8,040 feet (2,450 m)
- Skiable area: 1,010 acres (4.1 km^{2})
- Trails: 118 total: 0 Beginner; 23 Intermediate; 12 Advanced; 65 Expert
- Longest run: 3.5 miles (5.6 km)
- Lift system: 5 total (3 high-speed quad chairs, 2 triple chairs)
- Terrain parks: No
- Snowfall: 300 in/year (7.62 m/year)
- Website: http://www.aspensnowmass.com

Aspen Highlands is a skiing mountain in Aspen, Colorado, famous for the Highland Bowl ski area. The Aspen Skiing Company operates Aspen Highlands.

== History ==
Aspen Highlands was founded and the land developed in 1958 by Aspen resident Whip Jones. In 1993 Jones donated it to his alma mater, Harvard University. Harvard sold the resort to Houston, Texas developer Gerald D. Hines for $18.3 million. It later became part of the Aspen Skiing Company.

== The mountain ==
Aspen Highlands has become most famous for the Highland Bowl and other experts only terrain. However, the Bowl wasn't completely opened until 2002. Most of the mountain's terrain flows off of the narrow ridge extending from Highland Peak.

=== Mid and lower mountain terrain ===
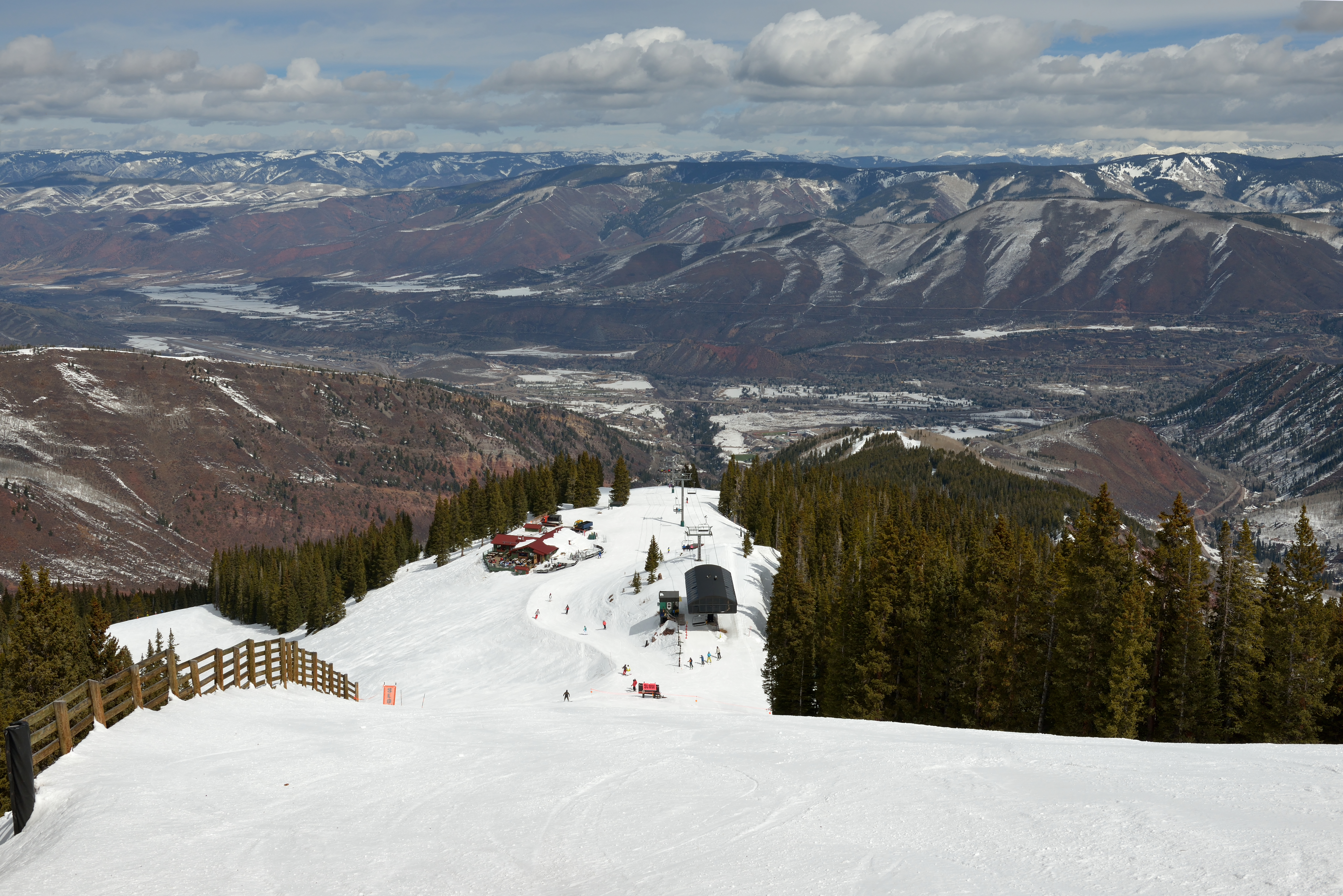
View of Cloud Nine

Rolling wide intermediate trails through thick lodgepole pine forest constitute most of the mid-to-lower mountain terrain. The very bottom of the mountain is dominated by the Thunderbowl, an expansive steep intermediate run that normally hosts most of the ski competitions on the mountain. The lower mountain also contains challenging expert runs such as Lower Stein, Golden Horn Woods, and The P-Chutes. It is served by the Exhibition and Thunderbowl lifts. The Mid-Mountain area is anchored by the 60s era Merry-Go-Round restaurant, with a large, south-facing deck. The Merry-Go-Round also serves as the hub of the major chairlifts on mountain. The Cloud Nine lift serves primarily intermediate and difficult runs on the mid-mountain as well as Scarlett's, a mogul run. The summit of Cloud Nine lift is the location of Cloud Nine Bistro, with views of the Maroon Bells. As of December 2017, Aspen Highlands has changed its trail map so that there is no more beginner terrain. This is presumably to encourage novice skiers to go to Buttermilk or Snowmass.

=== Upper mountain terrain ===
What attracts most skiers to Highlands is the dramatic, just-above-timberline summit of the mountain. The upper mountain is primarily served by the Loge Peak high speed quad originating at the Merry-Go-Round. The ridge that extends down from Loge Peak (the lift-served summit) has only one intermediate run, Broadway, which follows the ridge spine. On the skiers' right side is Steeplechase, an area of long and steep terrain with some runs reaching upwards of 45 degrees. Farther down is the Olympic bowl which contains steep slopes in and out of glades. Views of the Maroon Bells, Pyramid Peak, Hayden Mountain, and the Highland Bowl greet skiers at the summit.

=== The Highland Bowl ===
Since 2002, the Highland Bowl has been the crown jewel of Aspen Highlands. Most of the terrain is accessed only by hiking from the top of Loge Peak, although a snowcat can cut the distance by a third. Including the hike-to terrain in Highland Bowl, Highlands' skiable vertical descent increases to 4,342 feet (1,323 m). The Highlands ski patrol monitors the Bowl and conducts avalanche control for skier safety. The Bowl faces primarily east, towards Aspen Mountain. Generally, the best snow to be found is in the north-facing G-Zones ("G" corresponds to green ski wax, for the coldest temperature snow). The B-Zones (for blue wax) face east and descend down the center of the bowl from the 12,392 ft (3,777 m) summit of Highland Peak. The south-facing Y-Zones (yellow wax), are the steepest, with slopes as steep as 48 degrees, according to Aspen Highlands trail maps. These can be skied without hiking. Prior to the construction of the Deep Temerity lift in 2005, a run down the Highland Bowl required then taking the Grand Traverse, a long, flat catwalk, to get back to the Loge Peak lift. The Highland Bowl also offers access from the summit into the steep and highly avalanche prone backcountry Five Fingers Bowl.

On March 31, 1984, ski patrolmen Chris Kessler, Tom Snyder, and Craig Soddy were completing avalanche control work in Highland Bowl. The three set off explosive charges near the top of the Bowl. Their bombs yielded no sign of danger and they continued to do explosive work. Their second explosion triggered a slide and before the three could escape an avalanche fell from above them. All three died. A monument in their memory has been erected near the top of the Loge Peak lift above the ski runs named in their honor (Kessler's Bowl, Snyder's Ridge, and Soddbuster).

=== Terrain aspects ===
- North: 50%
- West: 15%
- East: 35%

== New terrain ==
Just before the 2005–2006 season The Aspen Skiing Company completed work on the new fixed grip triple lift "Deep Temerity". The $2.7 million project eliminated the lengthy trek out from the bottom of the Highland Bowl, the Temerity glades, and Steeplechase. 180 acres (0.73 km^{2}) of new terrain accompany the Deep Temerity lift for the 05–06 season, with the ultimate potential for 270 acres (1.1 km^{2}) of new terrain. This will push Aspen Highlands' total area over 1,000 acres (4.0 km^{2}).

== Filmography ==
Aspen Highlands, was the backdrop for the bowl skiing in the 1993 movie Aspen Extreme.

== Spring skiing on the highlands ==
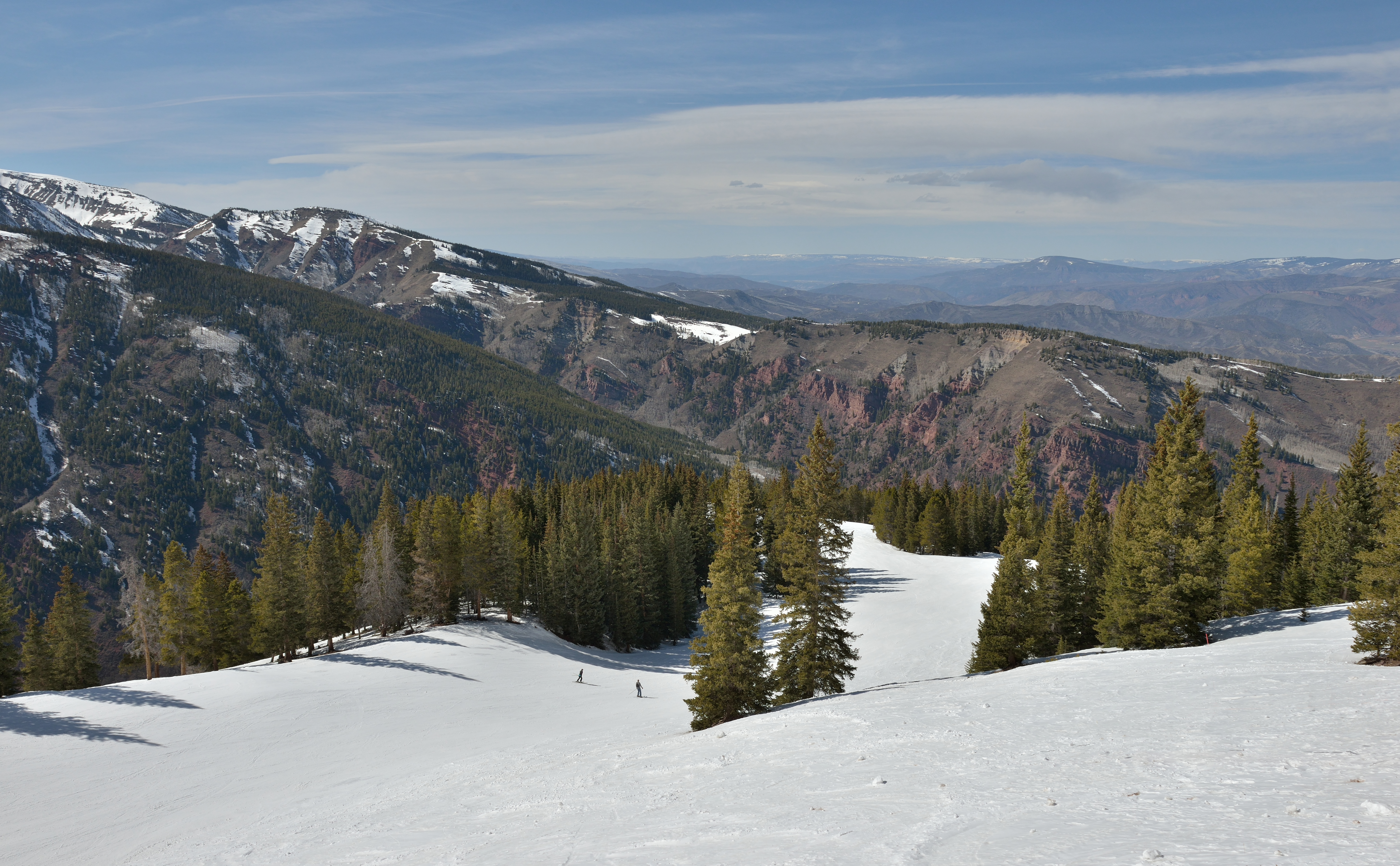
The Lower Olympic run, from the top of the Cloud 9 chairlift

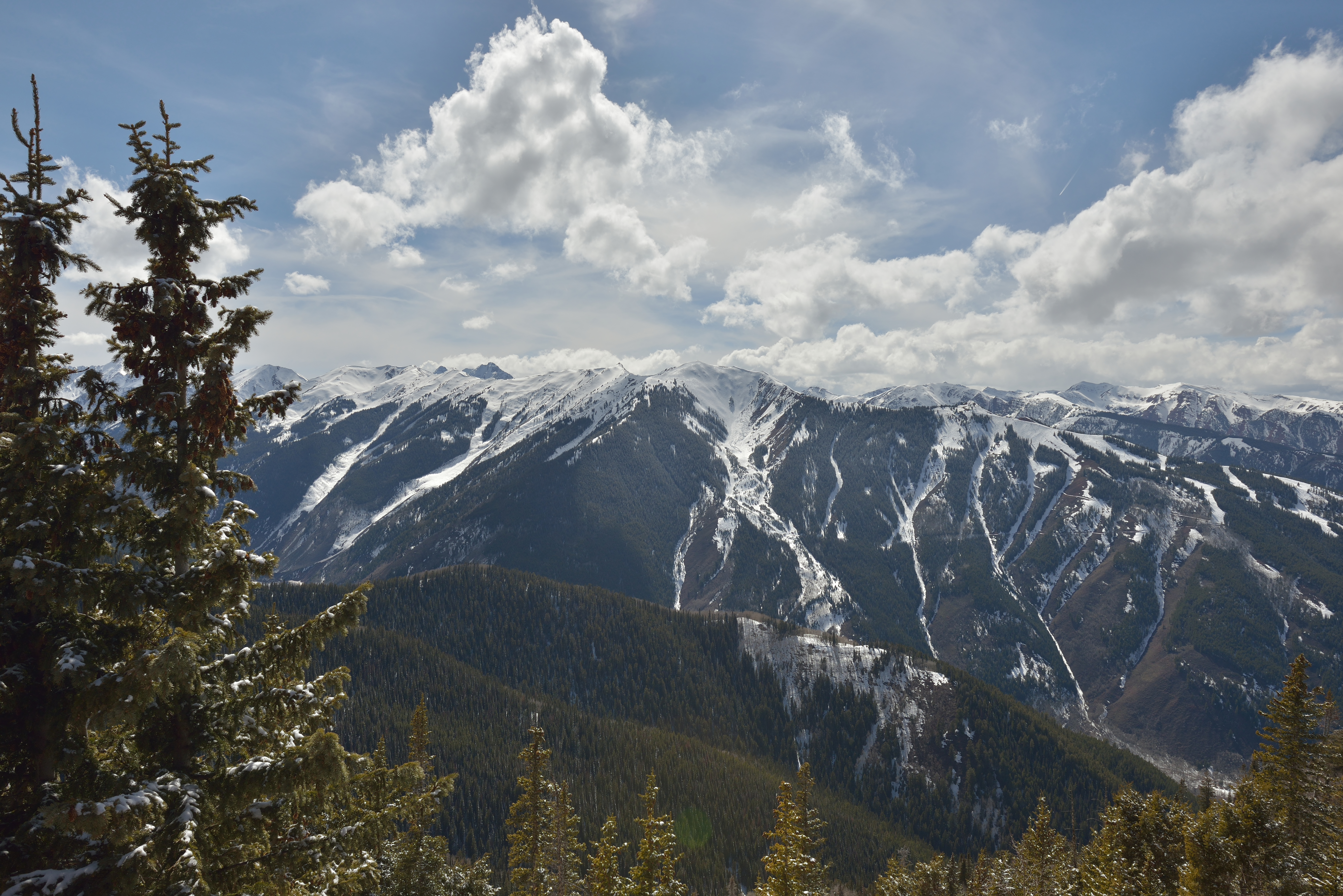
The Highland Bowl, view from Aspen Mountain

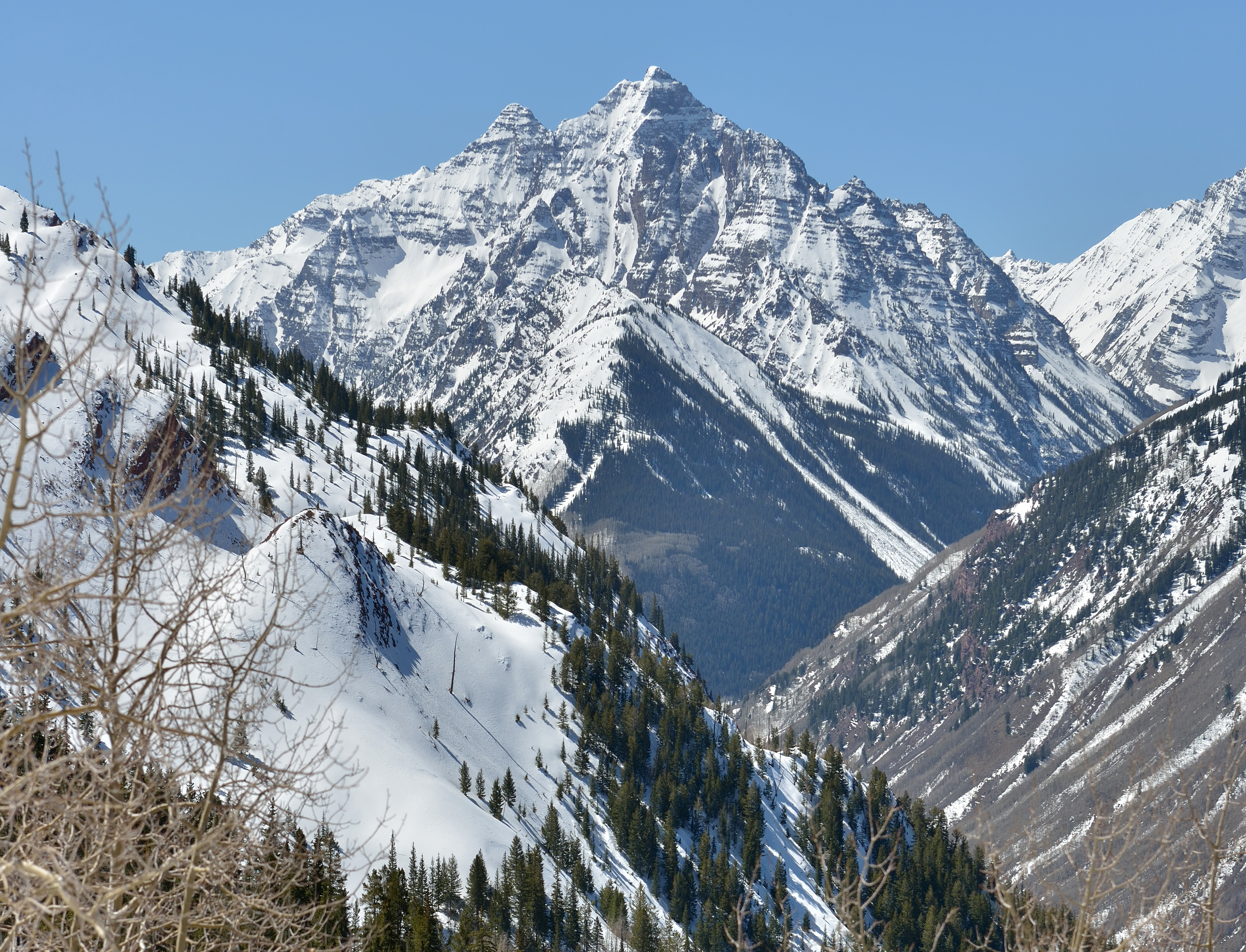
View of Pyramid Peak from Highlands

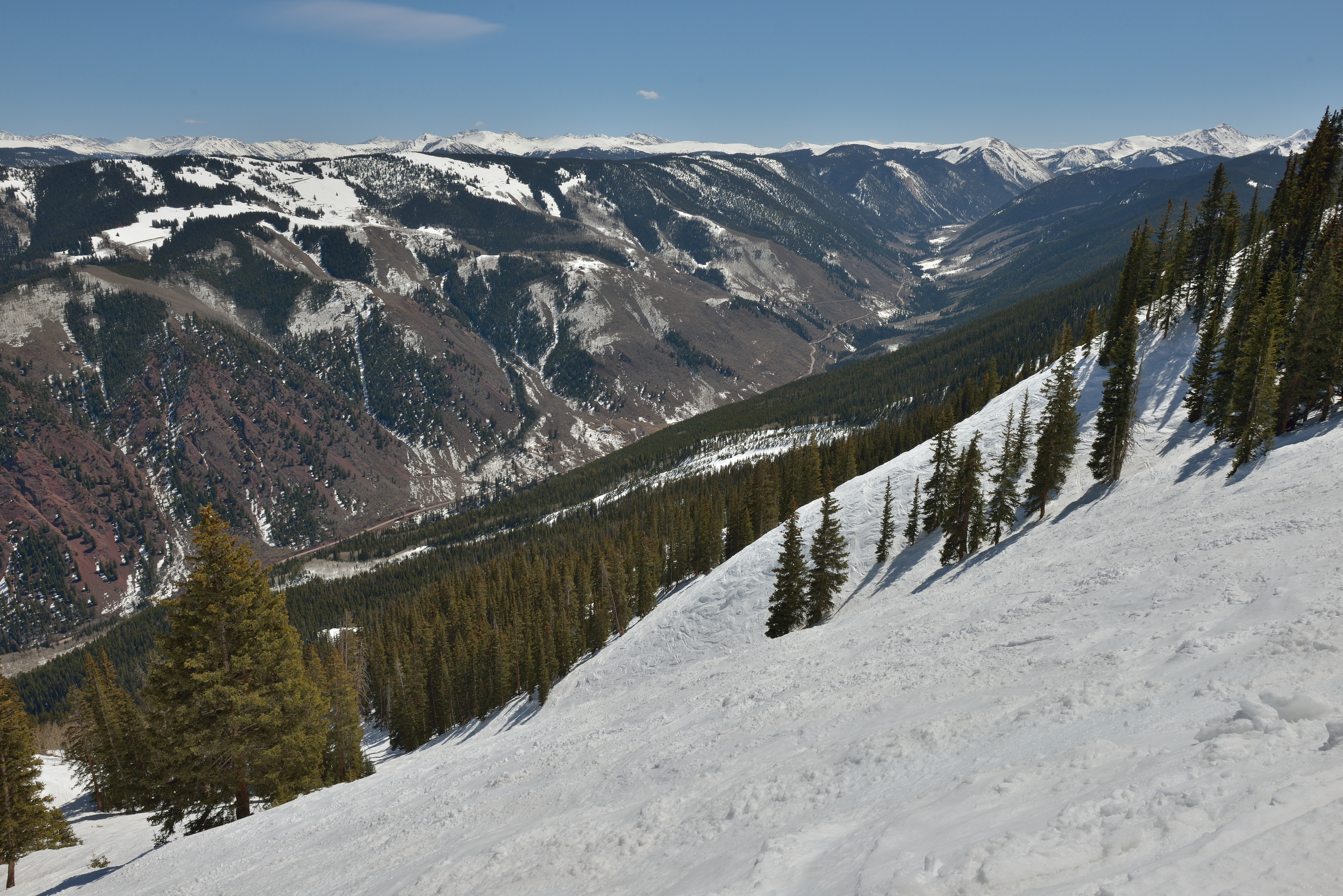
Aspen Highlands Steeplechase run

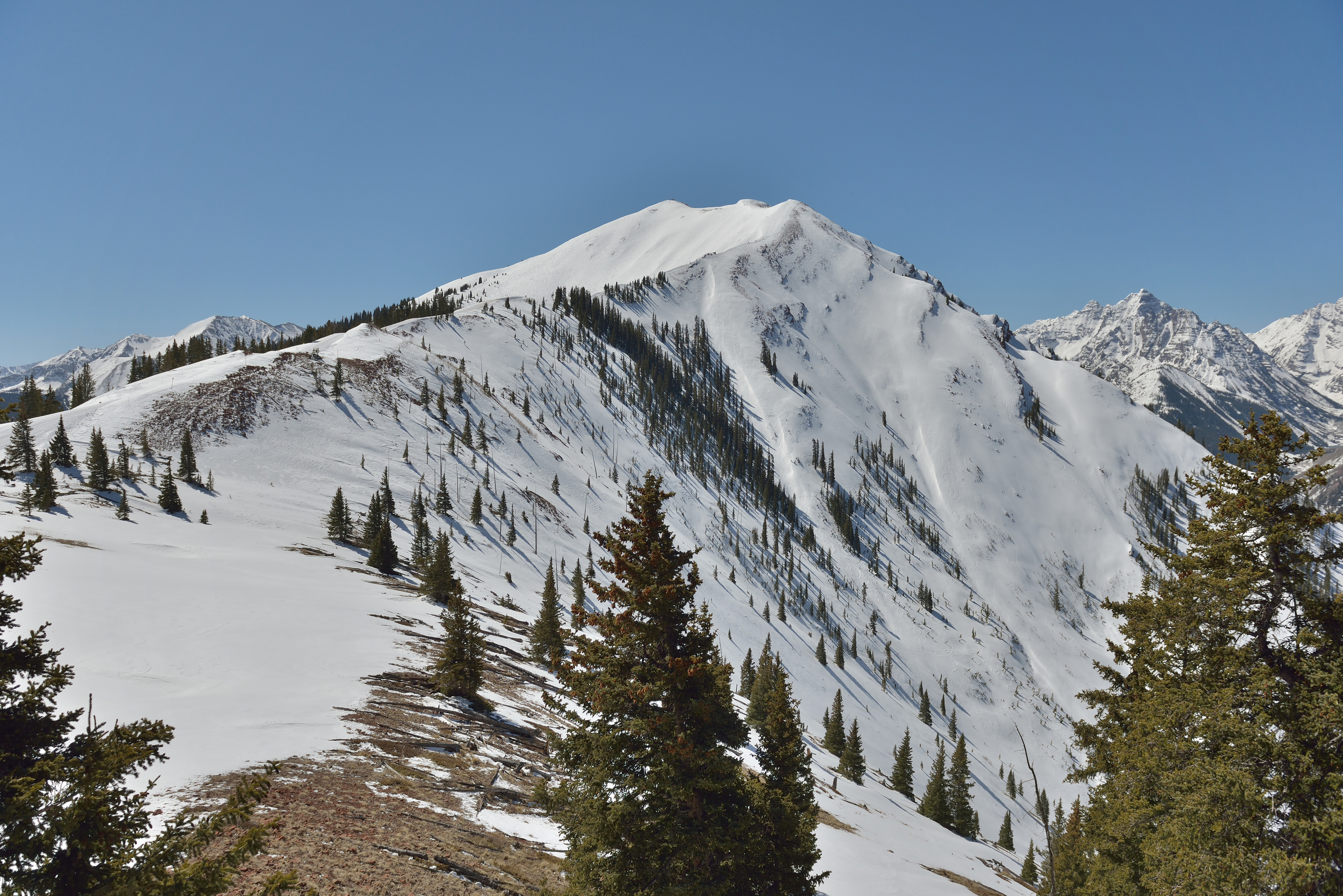
Highland Peak

== See also ==
- Whip Jones, Founder
- Aspen Mountain (Ajax)
- Snowmass
- Buttermilk
- Aspen Skiing Company
