= Murder of Nancy Pfister =

2014 murder in Buttermilk, Colorado, United States

- Pfister in an undated photo
- Born: Nancy Merle Pfister; July 4, 1956; Orofino, Idaho, U.S.
- Died: February 26, 2014 (aged 57); Buttermilk, Colorado, U.S.
- Cause of death: Murder (exsanguination and blunt force trauma)
- Occupation: Tour guide
- Children: 2
- Parent(s): Art and Betty Pfister

Nancy Merle Pfister was an American woman who was found murdered on February 26, 2014, in a walk-in closet of her secluded home in the Rocky Mountains. She had been beaten in the head and chest with a hammer, ax, and lamp. Pfister has been described as having been a "small-town socialite" and was well known in her small community. In October 2014, Trey and Nancy Styler, Pfister's former roommates, were charged with the crime. Shortly thereafter, Trey confessed to her murder, and received life imprisonment in exchange for the charges against his wife to be dropped.

Styler claimed he killed Pfister as "punishment" for adding an interest rate to the couple's rent after they refused to pay for over three months. The Stylers had stopped paying rent after living with Pfister for 2 months, due to minor broken utilities in the home that she refused to fix. The case gained national notoriety and sparked many debates on renter's rights.

== Early life ==
Nancy Pfister was born on July 4, 1956. in Orofino, Idaho. She was raised in Basalt, Colorado, and attended Basalt High School. Nancy was the daughter of Art Pfister, who founded the Buttermilk Ski Resort in 1958.

Her mother, Betty Haas Pfister, was a member of the Women Airforce Service Pilots (WASP) in World War II, who in later years flew a helicopter, which she was notoriously known for parking in the family's driveway. After her mother was diagnosed with dementia, Nancy became her primary caregiver until her death in 2011, 3 years prior to the murder.

Pfister attended college at Brooklyn's Pratt Institute, but dropped out and returned home to Colorado at age 20. She continued to help run the family business which, at the time, played a major role in the local tourism industry. At age 29 and never having been married, Nancy gave birth to her daughter Juliana. She later gave birth to a son at age 39. Pfister was a member of the Roaring Fork School District PTA. Pfister raised both of her children as a single mother in a log home her father had built for her in 1991.

Shortly before the time of her death, she rented a portion of the house to retired doctor Trey Styler and his wife Nancy as a way to help pay off her mortgage. Pfister abruptly evicted the Stylers from her house, and refused to let the Stylers collect their belongings from the home after they failed to move out on the agreed upon date.

== Death ==
On the evening of Wednesday, February 26, 2014, Kathy Carpenter, a friend of Pfister, became concerned when Pfister had not returned her phone call from two days earlier.

After learning that Nancy had not shown up for her job as a tour guide for two days, Carpenter drove to Pfister's secluded log home on the north slope of Buttermilk Mountain. However, there seemed to be no trace of the missing woman. She later told police that as she entered the master bedroom, she noticed the bed in disarray, the comforter draped over the side, and the sheets pulled off one side of the mattress.

As she drew closer, she noticed a very small stain of blood spattered on the bed frame. Carpenter found the bedroom closet locked. Using a skeleton key that Pfister had given her, she was able to unlock the door and discovered Nancy Pfister's lifeless body. Carpenter immediately called 911, and investigators arrived to examine the body before taking it to the crime lab. Nancy Pfister was still in her pajamas and had a large gash in her torso, where she had been struck with an ax.

The wounds to Nancy Pfister's face were later determined to have been caused by someone beating her with a hammer. There were no defensive wounds on Nancy Pfister's body, which led the medical examiner to believe that Nancy had been beaten while she slept. He determined that the cause of her death was due to blunt force trauma to the head and exsanguination. Pfister's memorial service was held at Hotel Jerome, her favorite place in Aspen. Hundreds of people came to the memorial.

=== Investigation ===
Police immediately became suspicious when they received information that Pfister and her then 16-year-old son had abruptly returned home early from vacation a week prior to her murder. Kathy Carpenter told them that she had picked the two up from the airport, driven them home, and was asked by Pfister if she could stay at the house over the weekend. Almost immediately after arriving home, Nancy phoned her son's father and arranged for her son to spend the weekend at his house. She did not give an explanation to her son as to why he could not stay at her house that weekend.

After spending the weekend with Pfister, Carpenter got up early and left for work, leaving Pfister alone at the house. Carpenter left a note on the door for guests, saying that Pfister was sleeping, and to call her to see if she was awake enough to talk before entering the house. Another one of Nancy's friends, Billy Clayton, said that he did not want to bother Pfister while she was sleeping, so he sent her an email. Pfister never replied.

Things became even more strange on Wednesday when Pfister's roommates Trey and Nancy Styler called Kathy Carpenter to tell her that they had recently moved out. They told her that they had moved into a motel in Basalt, Colorado, returning to the home only to clear out their belongings. Carpenter drove over to care for Pfister's dog and decided to check on her later that night, then she found Nancy's body in the closet. Investigators turned their attention to the mattress, where they believed Pfister had been murdered. When they flipped the mattress over, they found a large pool of blood, indicating that whoever had killed Pfister had flipped the mattress to cover his or her tracks.

The police believed that Pfister had been dead since Monday morning and had lain in the closet for two days before Carpenter had discovered her. Based on where her body was placed, investigators also believed that she had been attacked by two people, who carried her body to the closet. Shortly afterward, they zeroed in on Trey and Nancy Styler, the couple who had been renting her house as there were no signs of forced entry.

=== Trey and Nancy Styler ===
The Stylers, each nearly 10 years older than Pfister, had met decades earlier in a hospital in Wichita, Kansas. Trey worked as a doctor and Nancy as an instructor. The couple were both said to have been incredibly smart, with genius-level IQs. Rey Styler, Trey Styler's older brother, later claimed that Trey and Nancy would "use their combined intelligence to manipulate certain situations." The Stylers were married in 1985 and had no children together, although Trey Styler had two daughters from a previous marriage.

In 1986, they moved to a large house in Valley Center, Kansas, which they had built together, and became world-renowned for their shared hobby of growing the Victoria water lily. The Stylers purchased matching Harley-Davidson motorcycles sometime in the early 1990s and began making frequent trips to the Aspen area around the same time. In 2000, Trey became ill and had to stop practicing medicine, which put a financial strain on the couple. Kansas authorities had investigated the Stylers in the mid-2000s for arson and insurance fraud after both of their cars mysteriously exploded within a 3-year period. However, police were unable to make an arrest due to lack of evidence. In July 2005, Nancy Styler was arrested and charged with assault after allegedly beating a waitress at a Wichita-area restaurant. She was sentenced to two years probation and ordered to pay the victim's hospital bills. After they were nearly fatally poisoned by carbon monoxide, Nancy Styler had the idea to permanently move to Colorado to open a spa and contacted Nancy Pfister to inquire about her real estate offer in the local paper.

In the summer of 2013, the couple sold their Kansas home, rented 2 storage units in Northglenn, Colorado, and began temporarily staying with friends in the Denver area. The Stylers moved into Nancy Pfister's home on September 24, 2013.

Police had no reason to suspect the two until they discovered that they had been in a monetary dispute with Pfister. The dispute stemmed from Pfister's refusal to fix minor broken utilities in the home, including a leaky faucet as well as various power outlets that no longer worked. The Stylers also complained about the house smelling like cigarettes (Nancy Pfister was a smoker) and accused Pfister of blaming the smell on them to keep their security deposit. Nancy Pfister was unhappy, but told her friends and family she did not feel it was right to evict the couple during the Christmas holiday season.

The Stylers paid Pfister a total of $6000 during their stay, which she kept in a safe deposit box at the same bank where Kathy Carpenter was employed. Pfister called Carpenter and told her she was kicking the couple out when she returned. By this point, the Stylers told Carpenter that they would be out by February 22. Pfister returned that day but they had not yet removed all their belongings. Pfister allowed them to come back a few times a week to move all of their belongings to the motel in Basalt.

When the couple failed to do so in a timely manner, Pfister began locking the house during the day while she went to work. After Pfister's body was discovered, the two were separately questioned by police, and they both denied any involvement in the crime. Trey Styler took and failed a polygraph test, which added to investigators' suspicions, but they could not make a murder case against the two. DNA could not be used, because it could easily be explained; the couple had lived with Pfister for five months before the murder. The Stylers were released later that day.

A few days later, a Basalt city worker was picking through a public trash bin when he discovered a bloody hammer, pill bottles with Nancy Pfister's name printed on them, and a vehicle registration for Trey and Nancy Styler's Jaguar X-Type. The city worker immediately contacted police. Police discovered that the trash bin was behind the motel where the Stylers were staying. Another important piece of evidence came when investigators discovered the owner's key to the closet in which Nancy Pfister's body was found outside the Stylers' hotel room. The Stylers were arrested on March 3, 2014.

Shortly afterward, investigators developed a theory that Kathy Carpenter had helped the two commit the crime based upon the way she made her 911 call, which supposedly contained 39 "indicators of guilt," and multiple statements Carpenter allegedly made to investigators describing items she had seen at the crime scene that seemed impossible to have been observed. Kathy Carpenter was arrested and charged with first degree murder three weeks later. Carpenter maintained her innocence.

In her interview with the police, Nancy Styler said that Pfister was a liar and an alcoholic (Pfister had been arrested on DUI charges) and hated by everyone in the community. Pfister had called her and her husband "trailer trash" and said they should be living in a "trailer park." According to Nancy Styler, Pfister treated her "like a slave" and treated Carpenter the same way. Prosecutors used this to say the Stylers and Carpenter had motive to kill Pfister.

=== Trey Styler's confession ===
Less than two weeks before the preliminary hearing, Trey Styler told police that he wanted to make a statement regarding the murder. He had taken a plea bargain: Confess and plead guilty to first degree murder, and both his wife Nancy and Kathy Carpenter would be released. Trey Styler began his statement when he told the police "I lost my mind, or at least my rational mind. It was me. It was all me."

Trey Styler described how he slipped out of his motel room while his wife Nancy was sleeping. He then drove his Jaguar to Nancy Pfister's house to confront her about the way she treated his wife when they rented her home. He then made the statement "I stuck my head in the door, far enough to ascertain that she was in fact in bed, and I called out her name again, and she still didn't respond." Styler described the gruesome details of what happened that morning. He told police that he quietly made his way to the bedroom, and while he watched Nancy Pfister sleep, all the rage that had built inside him, from the time his health began to decline, spilled out of him all at once. He began to focus his anger on Pfister and all of the difficulties she had caused.

He made his way back downstairs and grabbed a hammer and an ax. He also obtained orange extension cords and a plastic garbage bag, which he later used to tie her up. He then described how he struck her in the face with the hammer, over and over again, until she stopped moving. When he realized she was still breathing, Styler plunged the ax into her chest, killing her. Styler then wrapped Pfister's body in her bed sheet and multiple plastic bags and left her in the closet. He grabbed some of her belongings, such as her medication and cigarettes, to make it look like she was gone. He said he never told his wife. Kathy Carpenter was ruled out as a suspect. As part of the plea deal, charges were dropped against Nancy Styler and she cannot be charged for the crime in the future. Suspicion remains that Nancy Styler may have helped carry out the murder. Given Trey Styler's age and medical conditions, investigators do not believe he could have carried Pfister's body to the closet on his own.

The charges against Carpenter were dropped, but pending any future information investigators may learn, Carpenter can be charged in Pfister's murder. However, they have found no concrete evidence linking Carpenter to Nancy Pfister's death. Carpenter's possible involvement in the case has been widely disputed by friends and family of Nancy Pfister. Many believe that the police were suspicious of Kathy Carpenter due to intense media coverage in the aftermath of the murder.

In 2015, Carpenter, along with Pfister's daughter, petitioned the city of Aspen, Colorado to have Nancy Pfister's name added to the shrine titled in Memory of Friends of Aspen in Snowmass Village, Colorado. The shrine honors Colorado natives and former Aspen residents, such as John Denver and Molly Brown. Her name was added in 2016.

=== Aftermath ===
In 2015, Nancy Styler came out with the book Guilt by Matrimony: A Memoir of Love, Madness, and the Murder of Nancy Pfister. The book was poorly received in Aspen, described by the Aspen Daily News as "jarring" and "a giant hate speech." Styler describes Pfister as having borderline personality disorder and seems to glorify her husband (one chapter is titled "Trey to the Rescue"), all while maintaining she knew nothing about the murder. Styler accused Pitkin County investigators of mishandling evidence, a point about which Carpenter's attorney strongly agreed, and "having it out for her from the beginning."

Pfister's family, along with Kathy Carpenter, attempted to stop the book from being published, but failed to do so. Pitkin County Sheriff Brad Gibson said about the book "Throwing those kinds of stones at a woman who's been the victim of a murder is a horrible thing to do. That's right in line with the kind of people we're talking about. You don't need to do that. She's dead. Your husband killed her. Leave it alone."

Trey Styler pleaded guilty to first degree murder and received a life sentence, which was later commuted to 20 years. On August 6, 2015, Styler was found dead in his cell at Arrowhead Correctional Facility in Cañon City, Colorado. An autopsy later concluded that he had committed suicide by hanging. He was 67 years old. Shortly before his apparent suicide, he began divorce proceedings against Nancy Styler.

After his death, Nancy Styler filed for bankruptcy in Fall River, Massachusetts, under her maiden name, Nancy Masson. Masson went on to collect over $1 million from a life insurance policy taken out in 1985, when the couple were first married. There was no suicide clause written in the policy, meaning that the insurance company would still be liable given Trey Styler's cause of death. The bankruptcy filing temporarily protected the insurance payout from being seized by Masson's creditors.
