= Aspen Skiing Company =

Colorado ski resort operator

The Aspen Skiing Company, known locally as Ski Co, is a commercial enterprise based in Aspen, Colorado. In 2023, it reorganized internally under a new umbrella company called Aspen One. The Aspen Skiing Company operates the Aspen/Snowmass resort complex, which comprises four ski areas: Aspen Mountain, Aspen Highlands, Buttermilk, and Snowmass.

== History ==
The company was founded in 1946 by Friedl Pfeifer, an Austrian ski instructor and racing champion, Walter Paepcke, a Chicago industrialist, Judge William E. Doyle, James J. Johnston, and H. F. Klock. Paepcke also founded cultural institutions in the city, such as the Aspen Institute and the Aspen Music Festival. The Aspen Skiing Company established the Aspen Mountain Ski Resort on the mountain of the same name, above the town of Aspen, Colorado. The first chair lift, Lift-1, opened on December 14, 1946, and was the world's longest chairlift at the time. In 1950, the company hosted the FIS World Alpine Championships, the first international skiing competition in the United States. In the following decades, the company opened Buttermilk in 1958 and the Snowmass (originally the Snowmass-at-Aspen Ski Area) in 1967. In 1993 the company assumed ownership and operation of Aspen Highlands, which was founded in 1958 by Colorado Ski Hall of Famer Whip Jones. Previously, Jones had successfully sued Aspen Skiing before the Supreme Court for antitrust violations in Aspen Skiing Co. v. Aspen Highlands Skiing Corp.

The company didn't pay dividends until it was bought by Twentieth Century Fox in 1977, which is when the ticket prices began to increase. In the 1970s, ticket prices were just over 10 dollars a day; now they are more reflective of industry averages.

In 2012, the Aspen Skiing Company built a 3-megawatt methane-to-electricity plant in Somerset, Colorado, at Oxbow Carbon's Elk Creek Mine.

In addition to managing and operating four ski areas, the company operates and owns hotels including The Little Nell and The Limelight, both in Aspen, and The Limelight hotels in Ketchum, Idaho, and Snowmass, Colorado. The company also operates on-mountain and off-mountain restaurants and operates a skiing and snowboard school, The Ski and Snowboard Schools of Aspen Snowmass. The school provides group and private lessons at all four mountains and teaches all levels of students, from beginner to expert. The managing director of the ski school is Jonathan Ballou, who was appointed in the spring of 2017, succeeding Katie Ertl, who was appointed to Senior Vice President of Mountain Operations. The ski season typically runs from Thanksgiving Day to mid-April, depending on weather and snow conditions.

The Aspen Skiing Company is currently owned by the Crown family of Illinois. The Crowns also have significant holdings in General Dynamics, JP Morgan Chase, and Los Angeles real estate. The President and CEO of the company is Mike Kaplan, who succeeded Pat O'Donnell.

Aspen Skiing Co. announced in March 2022 a $23M 'makeover' plan at Buttermilk, which should be completed in time for the 2022-2023 ski season.

== Lobbying ==
The Aspen Skiing Company supported the Water Rights Protection Act. The bill would prevent federal agencies from requiring certain entities to relinquish their water rights to the United States in order to use public lands. In 2012, a court ruled "in favor of the ski companies... that seizing the privately held water rights usurped state water law." However, the United States Forest Service decided to pursue a "new regulation to demand that water rights be transferred to the federal government as a condition for obtaining permits needed to operate 121 ski resorts that cross over federal lands." The Colorado ski industry supported the Water Rights Protection Act because it believed the legislation was "needed to block a water extortion scheme by the Forest Service to withhold government permits unless the companies relinquish their valuable water rights." Vice President of the Aspen Skiing Company David Corbin testified to the House Natural Resources Subcommittee on Water and Power that the company would go out of business without the water.

== See also ==
- Aspen Community Foundation
