= Four Corners Methane Hot Spot =

Clustering of large methane sources near Four Corners, New Mexico, US

The Four Corners Methane Hot Spot (also called the San Juan Basin methane leak or New Mexico methane source or various related permutations) refers to a clustering of large methane sources near San Juan Basin, near Four Corners, New Mexico, United States. It is perhaps the largest source of methane release in the United States and accounts for about a tenth of the annual gas industry amount. The area has upwards of 40,000 oil and gas wells. The exact cause of the methane leak remained unidentified as of 2015, but appeared to be related to coalbed methane extraction.

The San Juan Basin contains the Fruitland coal formation. Ashley Ager, a geologist with LT Environmental, Inc., a company with oil and gas industry contracts, has argued that the leak is naturally occurring due to this formation contacting the surface.

However, NASA researchers concluded in 2016 that oil and gas production and distribution activities were principally responsible for the methane releases. The Four Corners area includes other methane sources such as seepage from coal mines, but researchers found these sources too small to explain the bulk of the observed emissions.

== See also ==
- Aliso Canyon gas leak
