= Aspen Community Foundation =

Charitable organisation in Colorado, US

Aspen Community Foundation is a community foundation that serves the Roaring Fork valley of Western Colorado, from Aspen to Parachute. Founded by the Aspen Skiing Company in 1980 (46 years ago) to promote philanthropy in the community, the Aspen Foundation, as it was originally named, raised funds by distributing ski passes to donors.
