= Kalman Haas =

American businessman (1847–1920)

- Born: 1840; Reckendorf, Kingdom of Bavaria
- Died: 1920 (aged 80)
- Occupation: Businessman
- Known for: Co-founder of Haas Brothers
- Spouse: Harriet Fatman
- Children: 3
- Family: Abraham Haas (cousin); Betty Haas Pfister (granddaughter)
- Website: haas-brothers.com

Kalman Haas (1847–1920) was an American businessman, co-founder of the Haas Brothers and member of the Haas family.

== Biography ==
Haas was born to a Jewish family in Reckendorf, Bavaria, one of nine children including brothers Charles A. (b. 1825) and Samuel (b. 1827), and sisters Flora, Johanna, Sophia, Babete, Lena, and Anna. He immigrated to New York at the age of 15 with his brothers where they peddled notions saving money to travel West. The brothers first worked as miners and seeing that there was more money in retailing began to sell goods to miners. In 1854, he moved to Portland, Oregon where he founded a grocery store. (His cousin, Abraham Haas, co-founder of the Hellman, Haas and Company – which became Smart & Final – began his career at the firm). In 1868, he moved to San Francisco, California and co-founded Loupe & Haas with his brother Charles and Leopold Loupe. In 1875, Loupe retired and their cousin William Haas (1849–1916) joined the firm which was renamed Haas Brothers. In 1875, there was a banking crisis in California due to a collapse in mining revenues and numerous banks closed including the Bank of California and Farmers and Merchants Bank of Los Angeles (founded by fellow Reckendorf-native Isaias W. Hellman whose brother, Herman W. Hellman was a partner with Kalman's cousin Abraham in Hellman, Haas and Company). As Haas Brothers was financially strong and the Hellman and Haas families were intertwined, Kalman announced that Farmers and Merchants Bank depositors could either redeem or transfer their accounts to Haas Brothers stores. The panic subsided and Kalman is widely credited with calming a moment that could have been disastrous; and both the Hellman and Haas families reaped the benefits of their efforts once the economy was restored. In 1886, he moved to New York where he served as the company's purchasing agent leaving the day-to-day operations to his cousin William as president and sons-in-law Leopold Klau and Carl Klau.

Haas served as a director of the Mutual Alliance Trust Company. Haas Brothers exists today as one of the largest liquor distributors on the West Coast.

== Personal life ==
In 1882, Haas married Harriet Fatman; they had three children: George Charles Haas, Edith Joan Haas Elser, and Robert Kalman Haas Sr. (director of Random House and co-founder of the Book of the Month Club). Haas died in 1920. His granddaughter was aviator Betty Haas Pfister.
