= Somerset, Colorado =

Census-designated place in Gunnison County, CO, USA

- Census-designated place
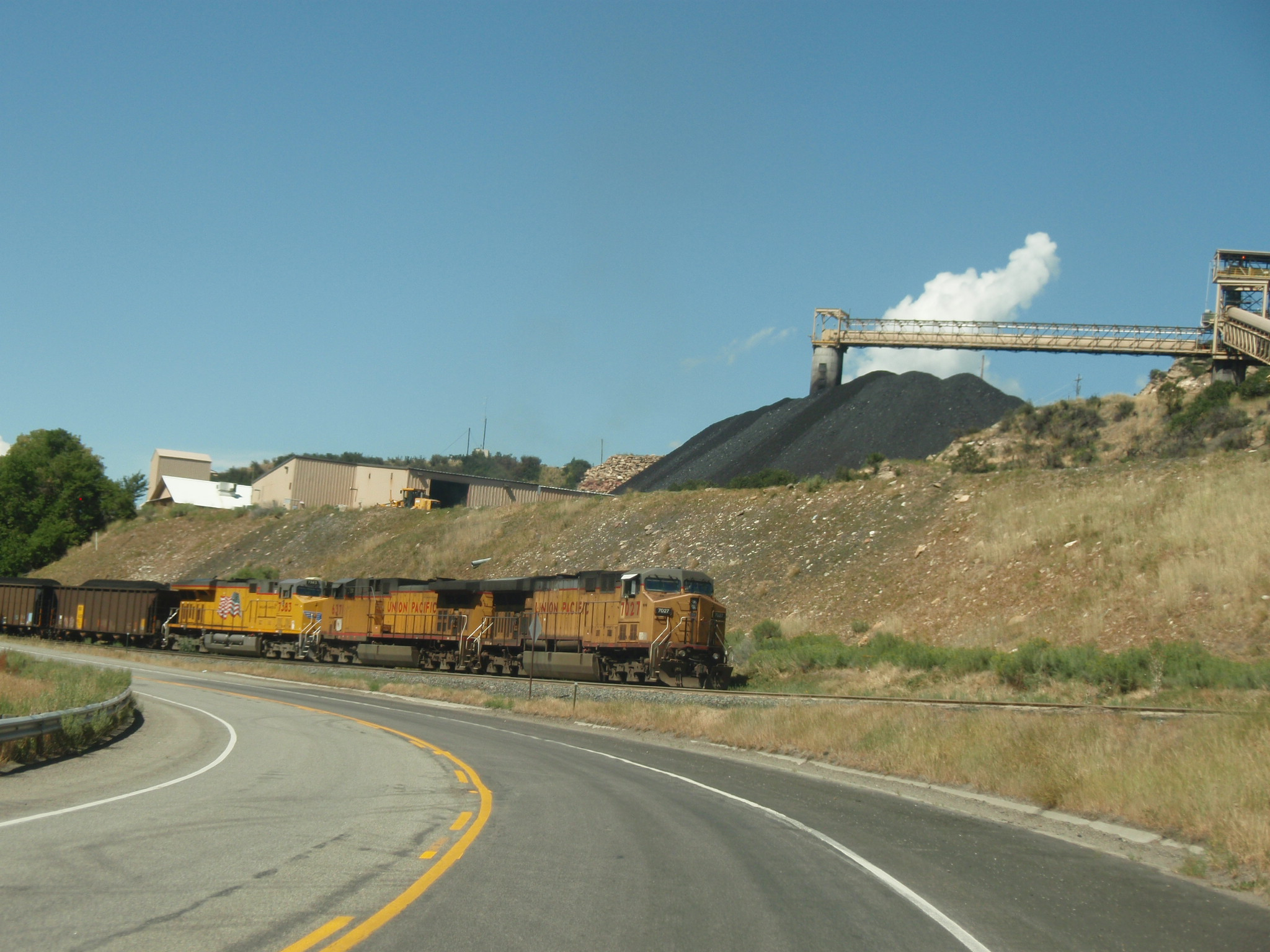
- Coal train near Somerset, August 2011

- Location of the Somerset CDP in the State of Colorado
- Coordinates: 38°55′41″N 107°28′22″W
- Country: United States
- State: Colorado
- County: Gunnison

Government
  - Type: Unincorporated town

Area
  - Total: 0.190 sq mi (0.492 km^{2})
  - Land: 0.190 sq mi (0.492 km^{2})
  - Water: 0 sq mi (0.000 km^{2})
- Elevation: 5,998 ft (1,828 m)

Population (2020)
  - Total: 55
  - Density: 290/sq mi (110/km^{2})
- Time zone: UTC-7 (MST)
  - Summer (DST): UTC-6 (MDT)
- ZIP Code: 81434
- Area code: 970
- GNIS feature ID: 2805921

Somerset is a census-designated place (CDP) and post office located in and governed by Gunnison County, Colorado, United States. The population was 55 at the 2020 census. The Somerset post office has the ZIP Code 81434.

== History ==
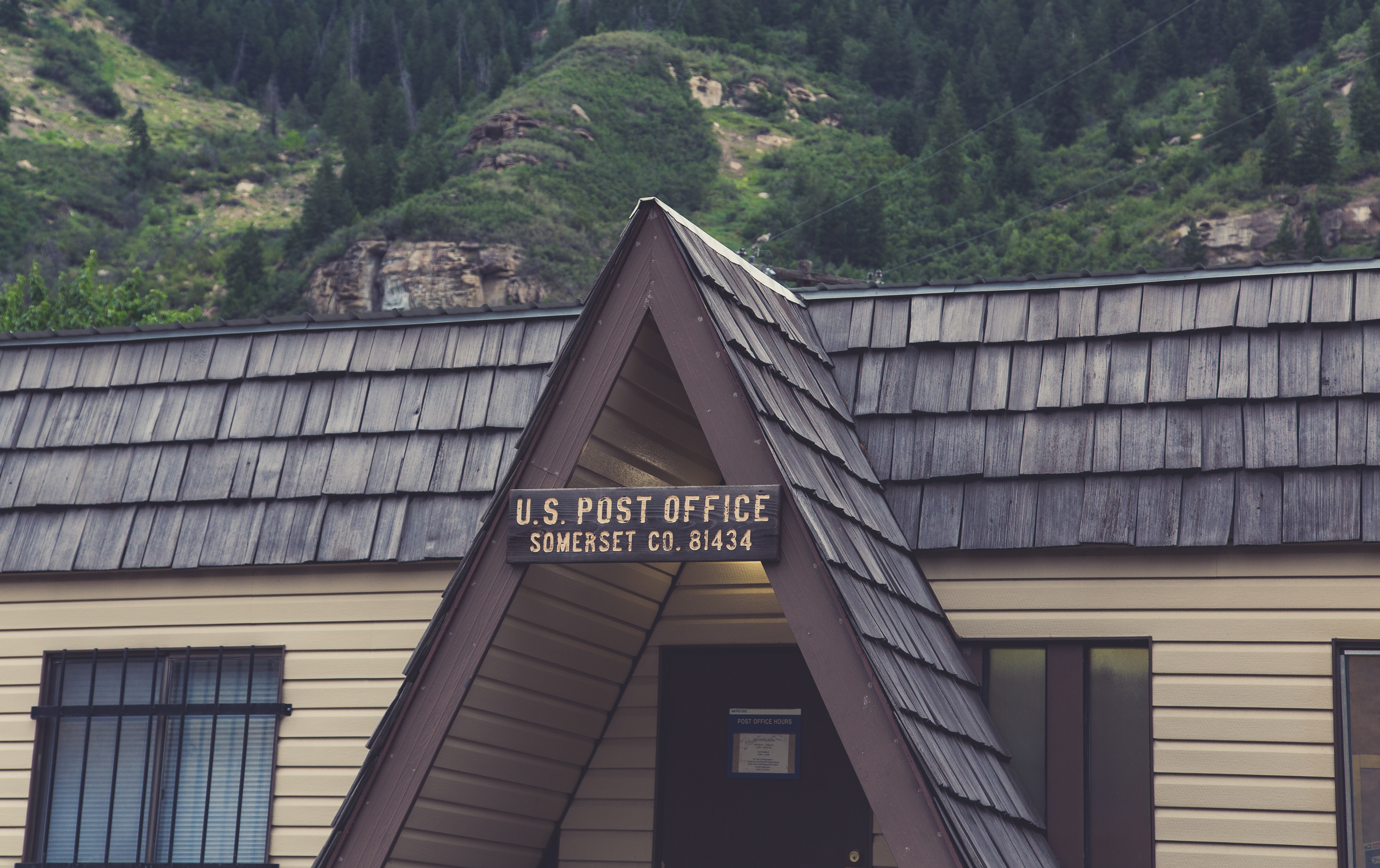
Somerset Post Office, July 2016

Somerset was named after Somerset, Pennsylvania.

In 2012, the Aspen Skiing Company built a 3-megawatt methane-to-electricity plant in Somerset at Oxbow Carbon's Elk Creek Mine.

== Geography ==
The Somerset CDP has an area of 122 acres (0.492 km^{2}), all land.

== Demographics ==
Somerset CDP, Colorado
Year	Pop.	±%
2020	55	—
Source: United States Census Bureau

The United States Census Bureau defined the Somerset CDP for the United States Census 2020.

== See also ==
- List of census designated places in Colorado
