= Highland Peak (Colorado) =

Mountain in Colorado, United States

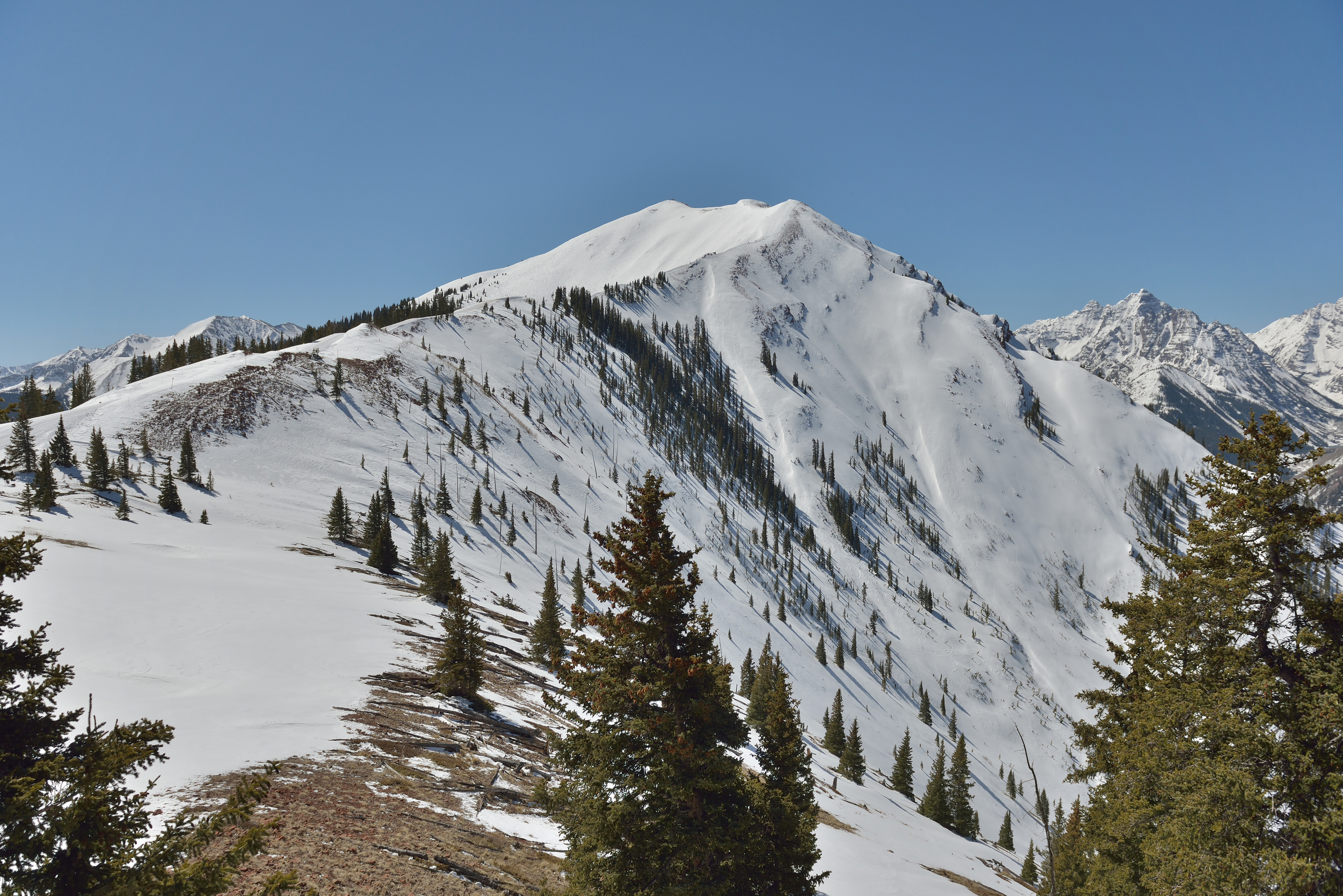
- Northeast aspect

Highest point
- Elevation: 12,381 ft (3,774 m)
- Prominence: 201 ft (61 m)
- Isolation: 0.64 mi (1.03 km)
- Coordinates: 39°07′44″N 106°52′37″W

Geography
- Location within Colorado Location within the United States
- Country: United States
- State: Colorado
- County: Pitkin County
- Protected area: Maroon Bells–Snowmass Wilderness
- Parent range: Rocky Mountains; Elk Mountains
- Topo map: USGS Highland Peak

Highland Peak is a 12,381-foot (3,774 m) mountain summit in Pitkin County, Colorado, United States.

== Description ==
Highland Peak is located 18 miles (29 km) west of the Continental Divide in the Elk Mountains which are a subrange of the Rocky Mountains. The mountain is situated 4.7 miles (7.6 km) south-southwest of the community of Aspen and set on the boundary of the Maroon Bells–Snowmass Wilderness, on land managed by White River National Forest. Precipitation runoff from the mountain's slopes drains into tributaries of the Roaring Fork River which is a tributary of the Colorado River. Topographic relief is significant as the summit rises 3,780 feet (1,152 m) above Conundrum Creek in 1.4 miles (2.3 km) and 3,780 feet (1,152 m) above East Maroon Creek in 1.3 miles (2.1 km). The mountain's toponym has been officially adopted by the United States Board on Geographic Names.

== Climate ==
According to the Köppen climate classification system, Highland Peak is located in an alpine subarctic climate zone with cold, snowy winters, and cool to warm summers. Due to its altitude, it receives precipitation all year, as snow in winter, and as thunderstorms in summer, with a dry period in late spring. This climate supports the Aspen Highlands ski area on the peak's slopes.

== Gallery ==
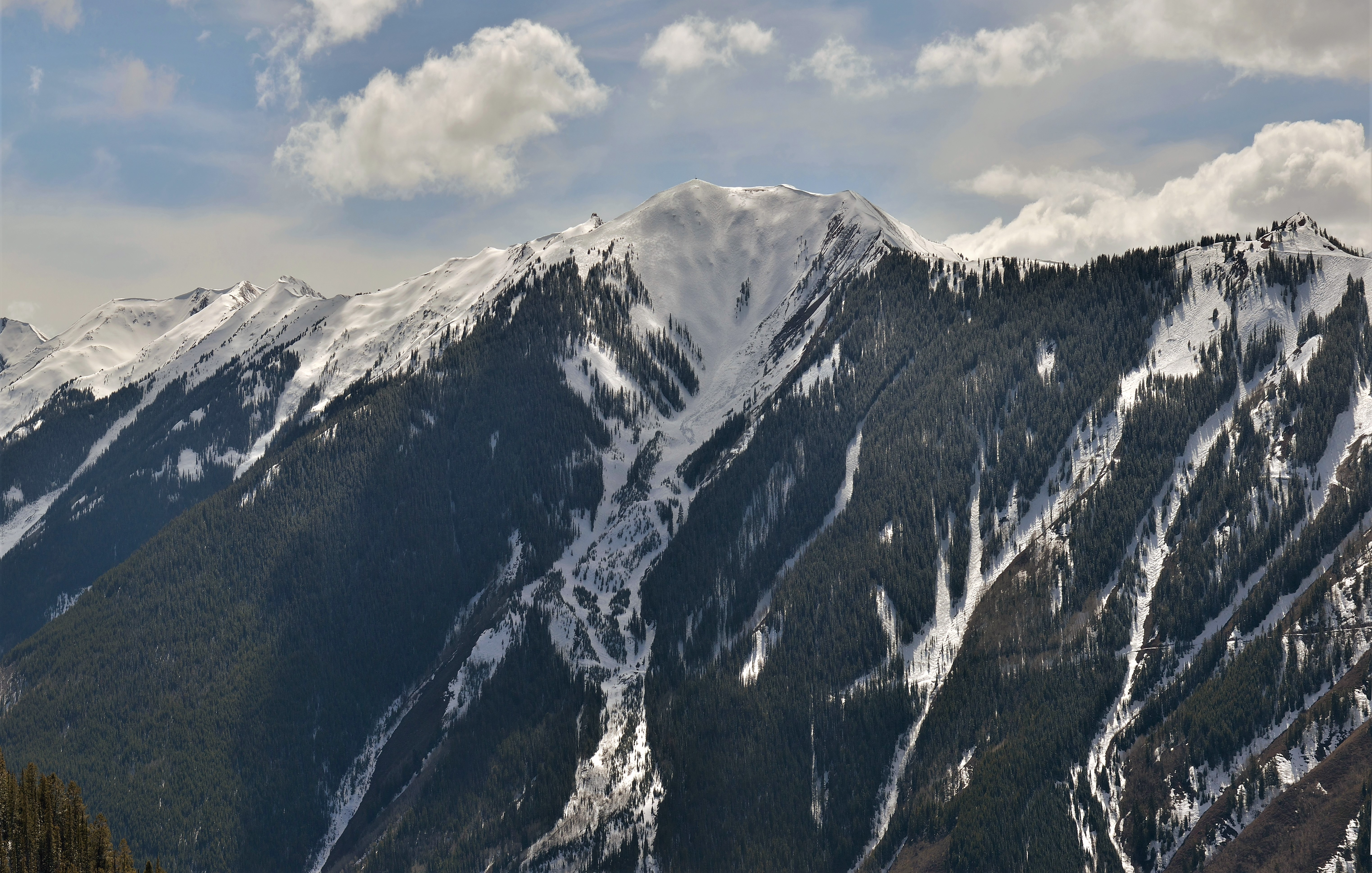
East aspect of Highland Peak featuring Highland Bowl.

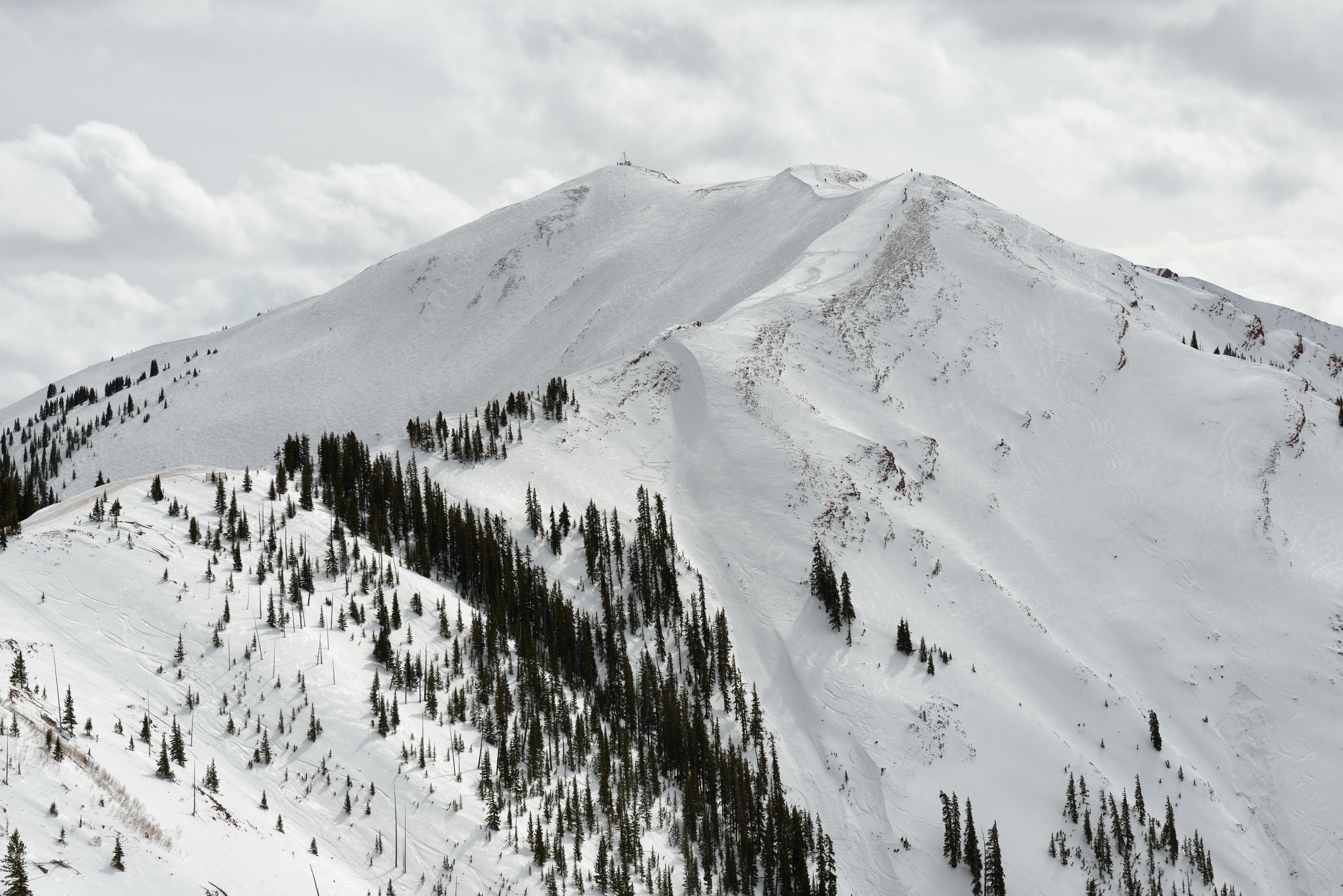
North aspect, from Loge Peak

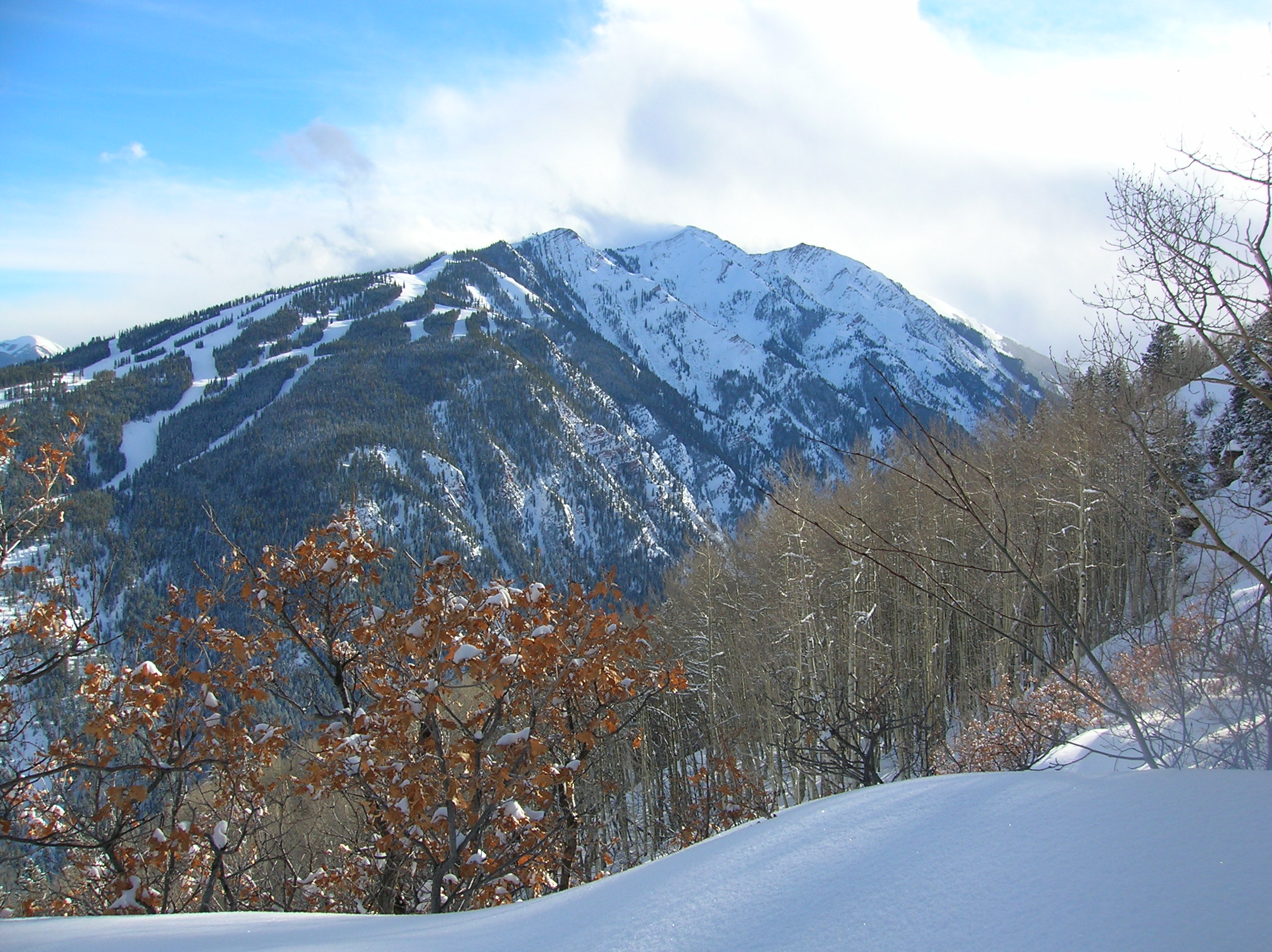
North aspect

== See also ==
- Mountains of Pitkin County, Colorado
