= Crown family =

American business family

The Crown family is a prominent family of American financiers and businesspeople.

Henry Crown (né Krinsky; 1896–1990) was an American industrialist and philanthropist, who founded the Material Service Corporation, which later merged with General Dynamics.

With his first wife he had three children, including businessman Lester Crown (born 1925).

Lester had seven children, including businessman James Crown (1953–2023) and businesswoman Susan Crown (born 1960).
