= Aspen Valley Health =

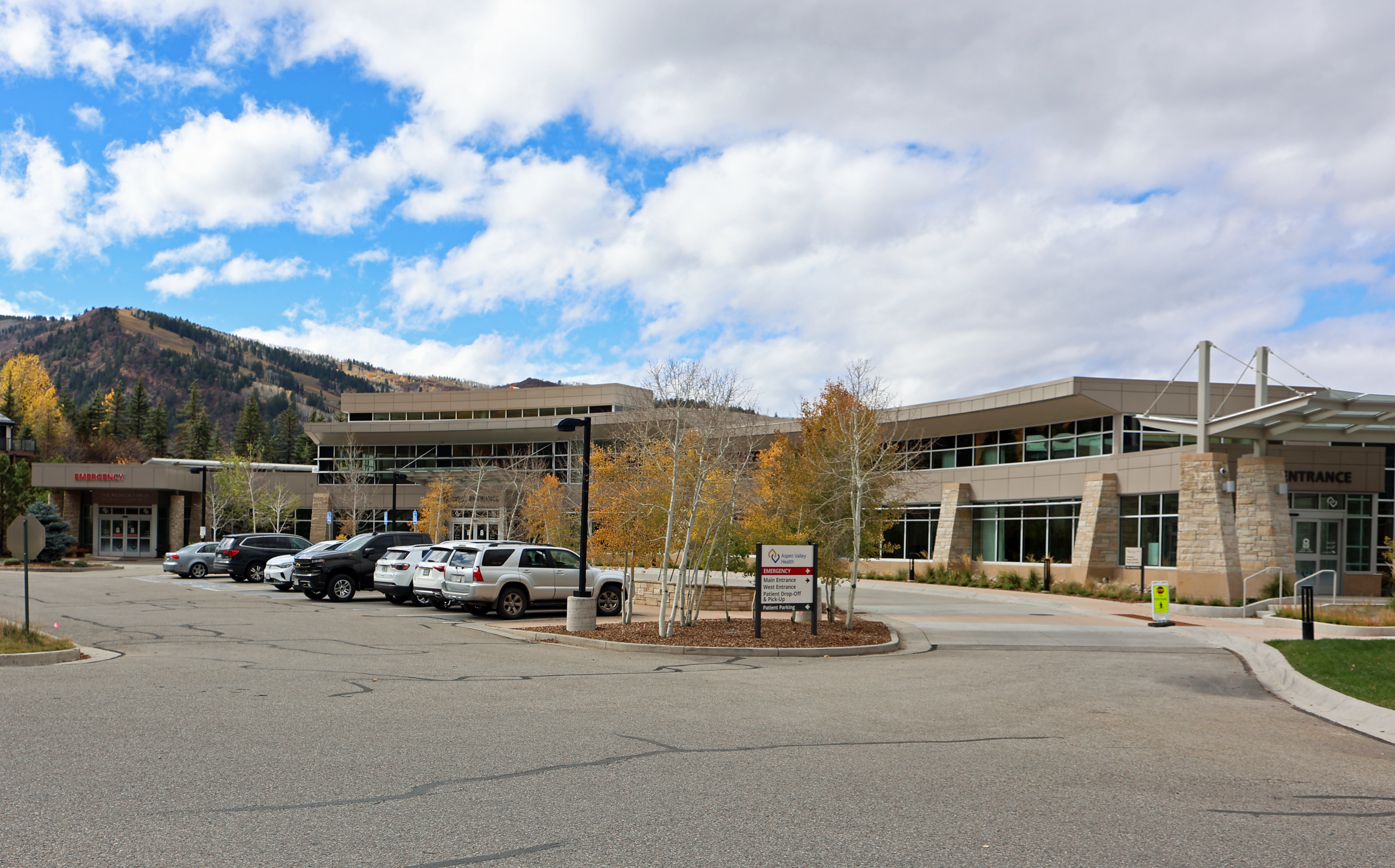
- The hospital's main and emergency entrance areas

- The hospital's location in Colorado.

Geography
- Location: 0401 Castle Creek Road; Aspen, Pitkin County, Colorado, US
- Coordinates: 39°11′25.71″N 106°50′20″W

Organisation
- Care system: District hospital
- Type: Critical access hospital

Services
- Emergency department: III
- Beds: 25

History
- Former names: Citizens' Hospital; Pitkin County Hospital; Aspen Valley Hospital
- Founded: 1891

Links
- Website: aspenvalleyhealth.org

Aspen Valley Health is a critical access hospital in Aspen, Colorado, in Pitkin County. It is a district hospital governed by an elected board of directors. The hospital is a level III trauma center. It has 25 beds.

Aspen Valley Health has clinics in Basalt and Snowmass Village. It also has a partnership with the Steadman Philippon Surgery Center, which operates a research institute and orthopedics clinic in Basalt.

== History ==
The hospital first opened in 1891 under the name Citizens' Hospital. In 1946, the name was changed to Pitkin County Hospital. It became Aspen Valley Hospital in 1961, and in 2025 the organization changed its name to Aspen Valley Health.
