= Snowmass (ski area) =

Ski area in Colorado, United States

Snowmass Ski Area
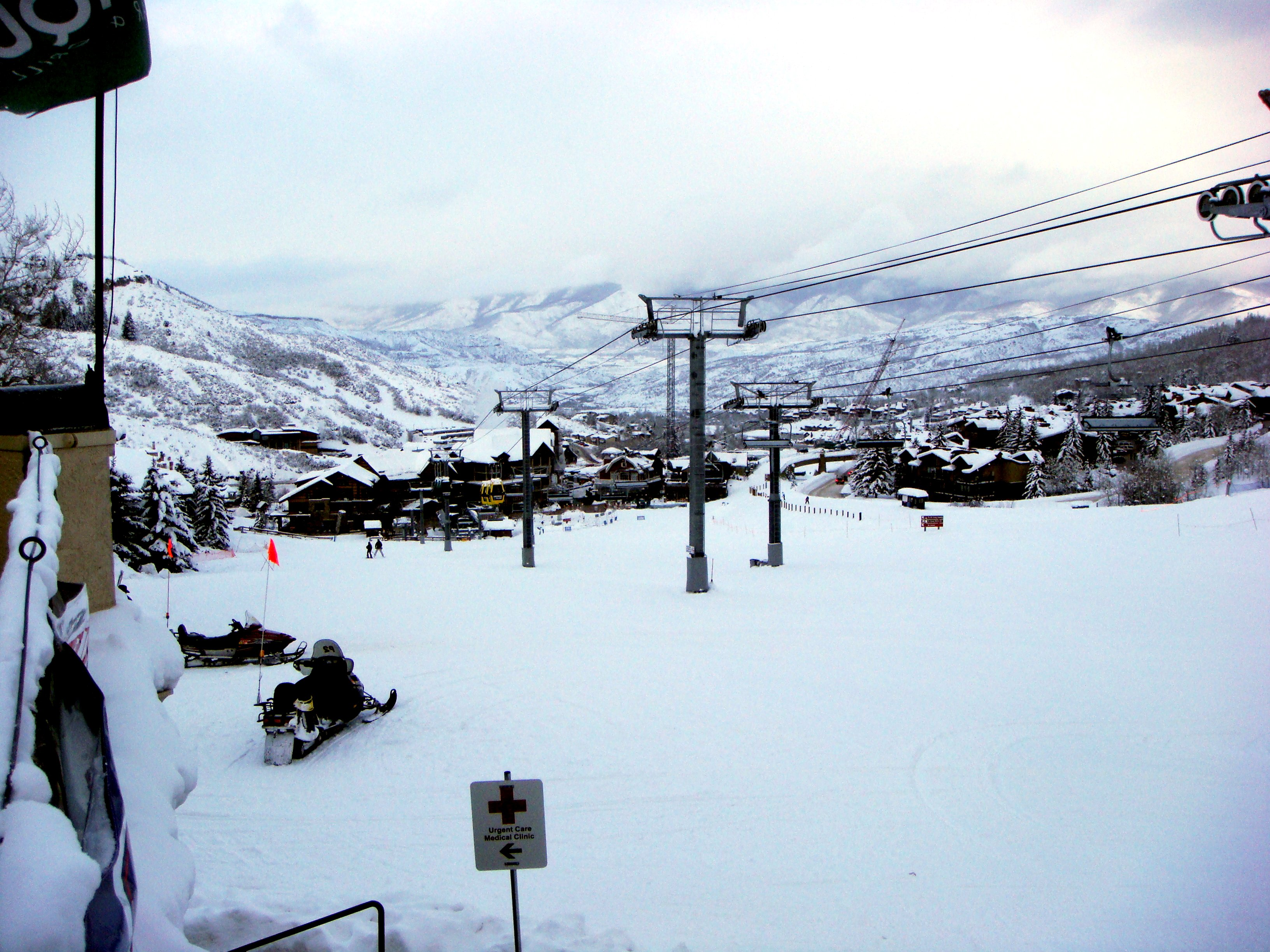
- The base of Snowmass Mountain, including a view of Snowmass Village in January 2008

- Location in Colorado Snowmass Ski Area (the United States)
- Location: Within the White River National Forest, adjacent to Snowmass Village and 9 miles (14 km) from downtown Aspen
- Coordinates: 39.1956°N 106.9513°W
- Status: Operating
- Owner: Aspen Skiing Company
- Vertical: 4,406 ft (1,343 m)
- Top elevation: 12,510 ft (3,810 m)
- Base elevation: 8,104 ft (2,470 m)
- Skiable area: 3,362 acres (13.61 km^{2})
- Trails: 94 total: 6 Beginner; 47 Intermediate; 17 Advanced; 30 Expert
- Longest run: Longshot - 5.3 mi (8.5 km)
- Lift system: 16 total: 3 Gondolas; 7 High-speed quad chairs; 2 high-speed sixes; 2 Quad chair lifts; 1 Double chair lift; 2 Tow lifts
- Terrain parks: Yes, 3 Terrain parks (Snowmass Park and Superpipe, Little Makaha and Lowdown Park), 1 Superpipe and 1 Minipipe
- Website: www.aspensnowmass.com

Snowmass is a ski resort located in the Town of Snowmass Village near Aspen, Colorado. The ski area is owned and operated by the Aspen Skiing Company as part of the Aspen Snowmass complex. It was opened on December 17, 1967.
