= Buttermilk (ski area) =

Ski area in Colorado, United States

Buttermilk Mountain
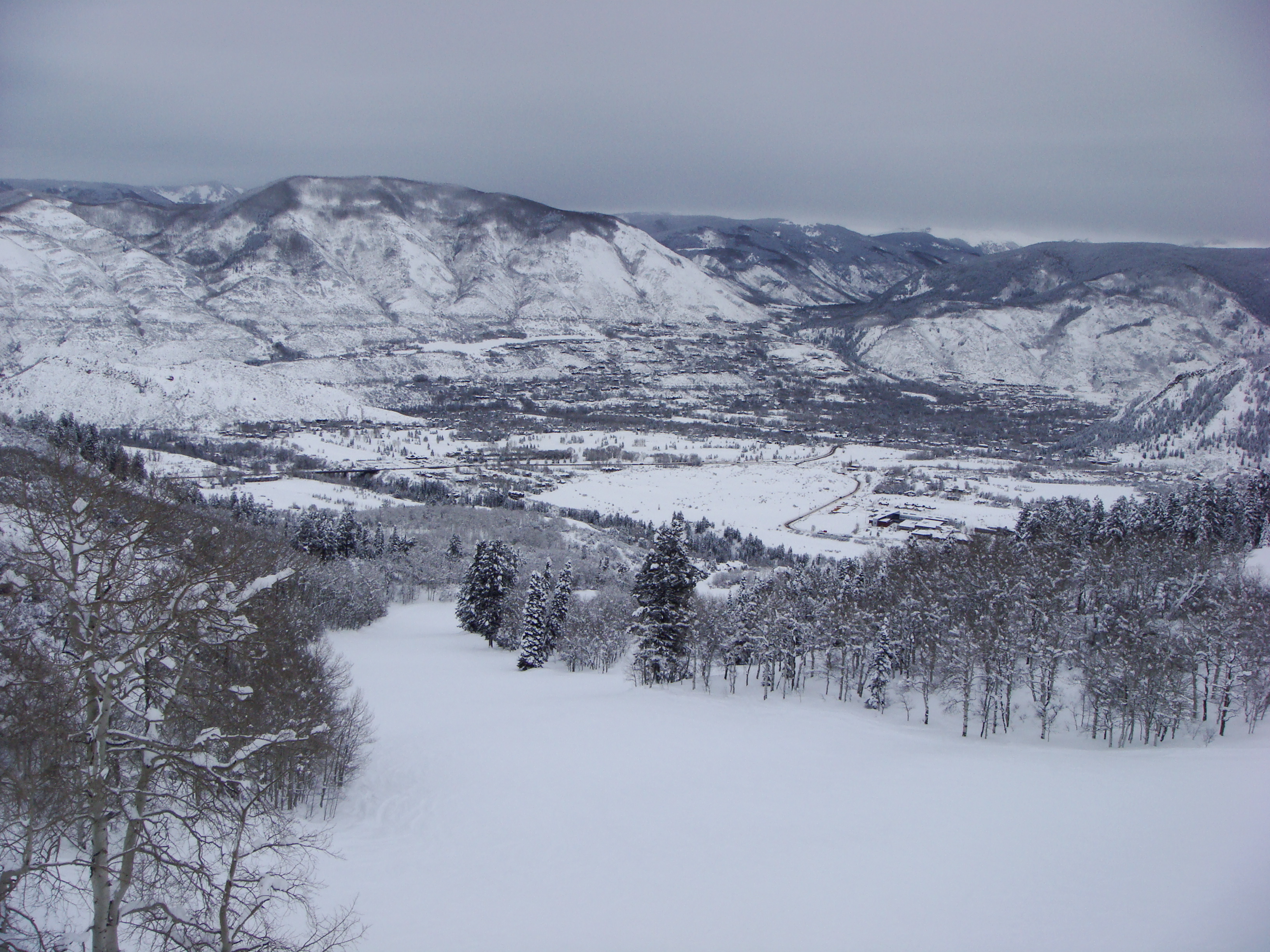
- Buttermilk in Winter

- Location in Colorado Buttermilk Mountain (the United States)
- Location: Pitkin County, Colorado, United States
- Nearest city: Aspen, Colorado
- Coordinates: 39°12′18″N 106°51′38″W
- Status: Operating
- Owner: Aspen Skiing Company
- Vertical: 2,030 feet (620 m)
- Top elevation: 9,900 feet (3,000 m)
- Base elevation: 7,870 feet (2,400 m)
- Skiable area: 435 acres (1.76 km^{2})
- Trails: 44 total 35% beginner 39% intermediate 26% advanced 0% expert
- Longest run: 3 miles (4.8 km)
- Lift system: 8 total (3 high-speed quad chairs, 1 double chairs, 4 surface/ski school)
- Terrain parks: 2, 1 superpipe
- Snowfall: 200 in/year (5.08 m/year)
- Website: http://www.aspensnowmass.com

Buttermilk Ski Area is a ski hill and an unincorporated community surrounding it in Pitkin County, Colorado. Located about halfway between the cities of Aspen and Snowmass Village, it is frequently considered the easiest skiing mountain in the area. Buttermilk has also been the host to the ESPN Winter X Games multiple times. It contains three ski areas: Tiehack (difficult), Main Buttermilk (regular), and West Buttermilk (easy). Art Pfister developed Buttermilk Mountain ski area in 1958.

Buttermilk is anchored by three high speed quads. The Summit Express services trails in the Main Buttermilk section of the mountain. The West Buttermilk Express, built in 2004, services beginner terrain on the west face of the mountain. The Tiehack Express, built in 2011, services advanced and intermediate terrain on the west face of Buttermilk Mountain. Buttermilk is known as one of the best beginner mountains in North America, to learn ski or snowboard. Its base includes The Hideout — an integrated play-and-learning area for children in ski school ages 2 ½ to 6 years old.

In February 2014, Nancy Pfister was found brutally murdered in a walk-in closet of her home in Buttermilk. The case made headlines across the country, and has been featured on Dateline and Snapped.
