= Holden/Marolt Mining and Ranching Museum =

- Holden Mining and Smelting Co.
- U.S. National Register of Historic Places
- U.S. Historic district
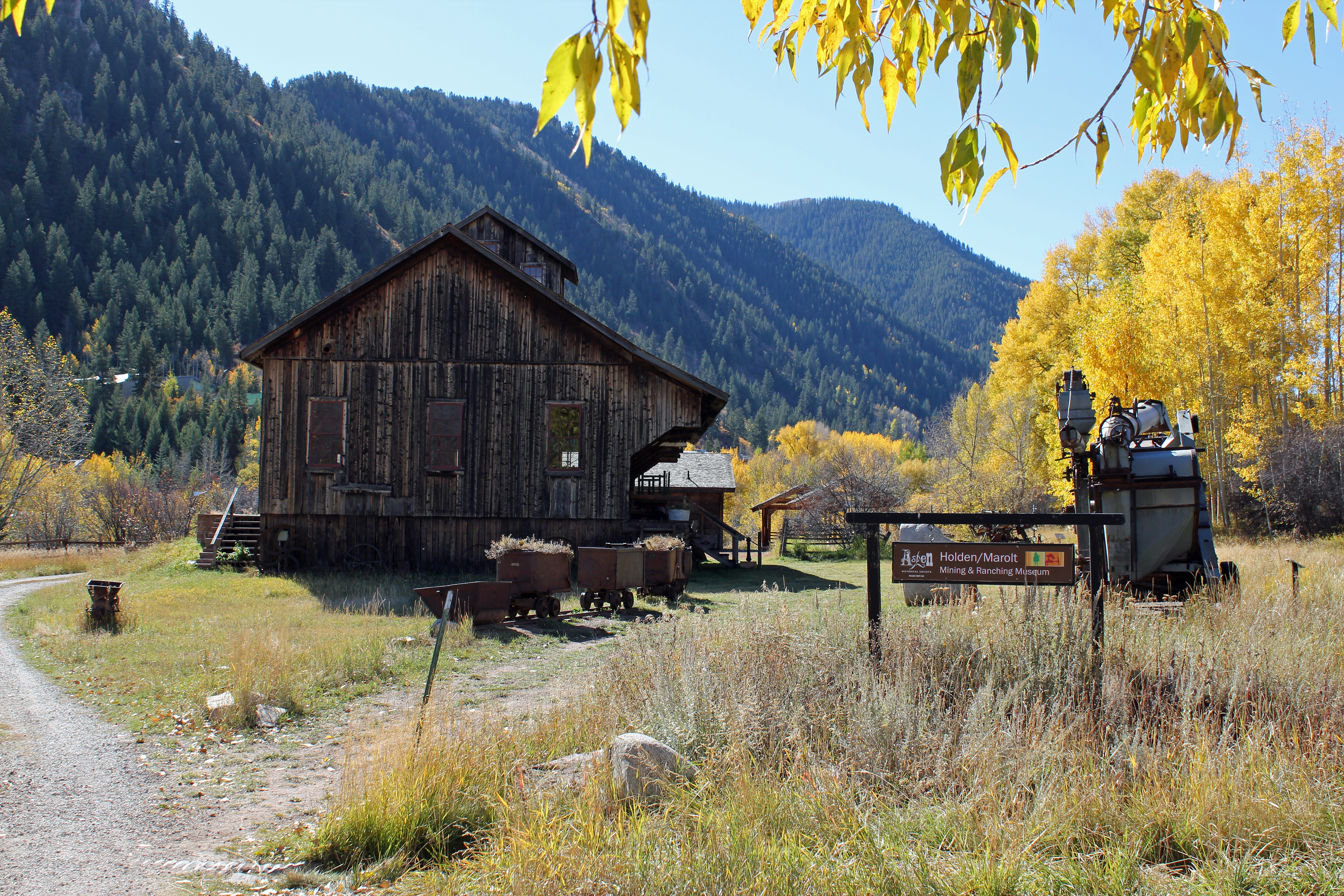
- Museum buildings from north, 2011

- Location within Colorado
- Location: Aspen, CO
- Coordinates: 39°11′34″N 106°50′5″W
- Area: 2.5 acres (1.0 ha)
- Built: 1891
- Architect: Salkeld and Behr
- MPS: Historic Resources of Aspen, Mining Industry in Colorado
- NRHP reference No.: 90000867
- Added to NRHP: June 22, 1990

The Holden/Marolt Mining and Ranching Museum is located on the former Holden Lixiviation Works facility on the western edge of the city of Aspen, Colorado, United States. It consists of two remaining buildings from the facility, as well as the relocated McMurchy/Zupancis domestic buildings. In 1990 the property was recognized as a historic district and listed on the National Register of Historic Places, the only district in the city to be so recognized.

The museum is housed in the former sampling building, which was built in 1891 to process ore mined from the mountains around the city into silver through lixiviation. Within two years it had to be shut down when a change in U.S. government policy led to a huge drop in silver production and drove it into bankruptcy. The buildings remained standing and were eventually bought by a local rancher to expand. His family later sold them to the City of Aspen, which turned the property into an open space and leased the buildings to Aspen Historical Society, to operate as a museum.

== Buildings and grounds ==
The museum occupies a 2½-acre (1.0 ha) tract on the south side of State Highway 82 just west of the residential neighborhoods in Aspen's West End. A mile to the west along the highway are the two Maroon Creek Bridges, the older of which is also listed on the Register. Aspen Valley Health is a thousand feet (300 m) to the southwest.

The land is generally clear and open, reflecting its past agricultural use. The mature trees that shade many of the West End's houses end abruptly to the east, and there is a small grove of similar trees, all aspens, to the west of the museum. To the southeast is one of the ridges of Aspen Mountain, with the houses of South 7th Street near its foot. Across Highway 82 is Aspen's streets department, some dwellings of more modern construction, and a golf course.

A system of paved bike paths and unpaved roads and paths leads to the museum from both Highway 82 and the official parking lot at the end of Marolt Place to the south. The main building is the plant's former sampling house, a one-and-a-half-story 77-by-42-foot (23 by 13 m) wood frame structure with vertical siding and a gabled roof from which a square cupola arises in the center. To the south are the remains of the salt sheds, one of which has been restored. In the vicinity are the remains of the smokestacks. portions of the sandstone foundation of the 250-foot-long (76 m) mill building. As the only undisturbed mill site from Aspen's mining days, it is considered likely to have archeological potential. These two buildings and the site are considered contributing resources to the Register listing.

Up a slight slope 400 feet (120 m) to the west is the original office building. It was converted into a residence in the 1940s with the addition of a 2nd story and aluminum siding - alterations which affected its historic character. These changes were considered substantial enough to preclude the building's inclusion in the historic district. A garage next to it and the irrigation ditch that meanders around the entire property are similarly non-contributing artifacts of the property's use as a ranch.

== History ==
In the late 1870s, prospectors from Leadville began heading west, over the Continental Divide at Independence Pass into Ute country, in search of gold and silver deposits in the upper Roaring Fork Valley. At Independence, just below the pass, a small settlement grew around the gold mines. It was soon displaced in importance by the settlement established further down the Roaring Fork, at its confluence with Castle Creek. Originally called Ute City, it was soon renamed Aspen after the trees on the flood plain and surrounding mountain slopes, which turned a brilliant yellow in the autumn.

Aspen became the seat of the newly established Pitkin County, named after Colorado's then-governor. During the 1880s, it grew rapidly, reaching almost 13,000 people. It was Colorado's third largest city after Denver and Leadville. Investors from the East built railroads, a luxury hotel and an opera house with their fortunes.

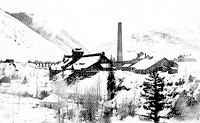
Plant ca. 1891

In 1891 a Denver businessman, E.R. Holden, formed the Holden Mining & Smelting Company with a $60,000 ($2.15 million in modern dollars) loan, most of which went to him personally. The company built a 22-acre (8.9 ha) lixiviation plant on the banks of Castle Creek. It was one of only 18 in the world to use the Russell Process, a combination of pulverization, salts and heat, to extract silver from ore samples with as little as 10 ounces (280 g) per ton (0.9 metric ton). Most Aspen ore ran 40–60 times that amount, and by the end of the 1880s the city was the nation's leading silver producer. The plant's 165-foot (50 m) smokestack was believed to be the highest in the state.

The plant remained open for only 14 months. After the Panic of 1893, Congress repealed the Sherman Silver Purchase Act, which had required the U.S. government to regularly purchase silver to support the dollar, in order to combat expected inflation. With the loss of a customer representing such a large portion of the market, many of Aspen's mines cut back production or closed outright. The Holden company declared bankruptcy, and the bank's inability to recover any of the loan led ultimately to it suffering the same fate.

With the decline in mining, many miners left Aspen. The decades of steady population decline that followed are known as the city's "quiet years". Agriculture, particularly ranching shared equal prominence with the little mining left as the pillars of Aspen's economy. Several attempts were made to revive the Holden plant as a concentrator, where the lower-grade ore could be stripped out. After the last one failed, in 1904 the property was abandoned, like so many others in the once-prosperous city.

By 1930 less than a thousand people lived in Aspen. Buildings from the boom years such as the plant stood vacant and deteriorating, many long since foreclosed by the county for nonpayment of taxes. The Marolt family bought the Holden property for a dollar in 1940 and added it to their nearby ranch. Most of the buildings were demolished at this point; a few, such as the sampling house, were kept. The Marolts used the property for grazing cattle and sheep, and potato farming.

Shortly afterward, with U.S. entry into World War II looming, the Army considered the site as a possible training facility for the soldiers of the Tenth Mountain Division. Instead it chose Camp Hale outside Leadville. The Tenth nevertheless developed a strong connection to Aspen as its members were banned from Leadville and often came to Aspen when on leave. After the war, many played a role in the development of the city into a popular ski resort destination.

It thus became more difficult to sustain the Marolt ranch after the war. The U.S. Forest Service offered less land for grazing after the resorts were built, and the Marolt family itself experienced financial strain and health problems. In the late 1950s, they began selling off fragments of their land.

Eventually the buildings became the property of the Aspen Historical Society. A grant from the Colorado Historical Society's State Historical Fund made possible the restoration of the sampling house, which had survived due to the heavy machinery once located in it. Costs of adding heating, plumbing, electricity and making it disabled-accessible eventually reached half a million dollars. A stamping plant was relocated from the uppermost reaches of Aspen Mountain to the site, and one of the salt sheds restored. The museum was opened in 2003.

== Museum ==
The museum features exhibits about the area's industrial and agricultural history. Among them is a diorama of the Holden Works as it originally stood, constructed by a local model railroading organization. Its collection includes machinery used in both mining and ranching.

The site's grounds are open to the public year-round. The Museum is open with a docent on site during the summer months, and by appointment in the spring, fall and winter. A fee is charged to adults; children are admitted free. Special group rates are available.

== See also ==
- National Register of Historic Places listings in Pitkin County, Colorado
