= Malemute Peak =

Mountain in Colorado, United States

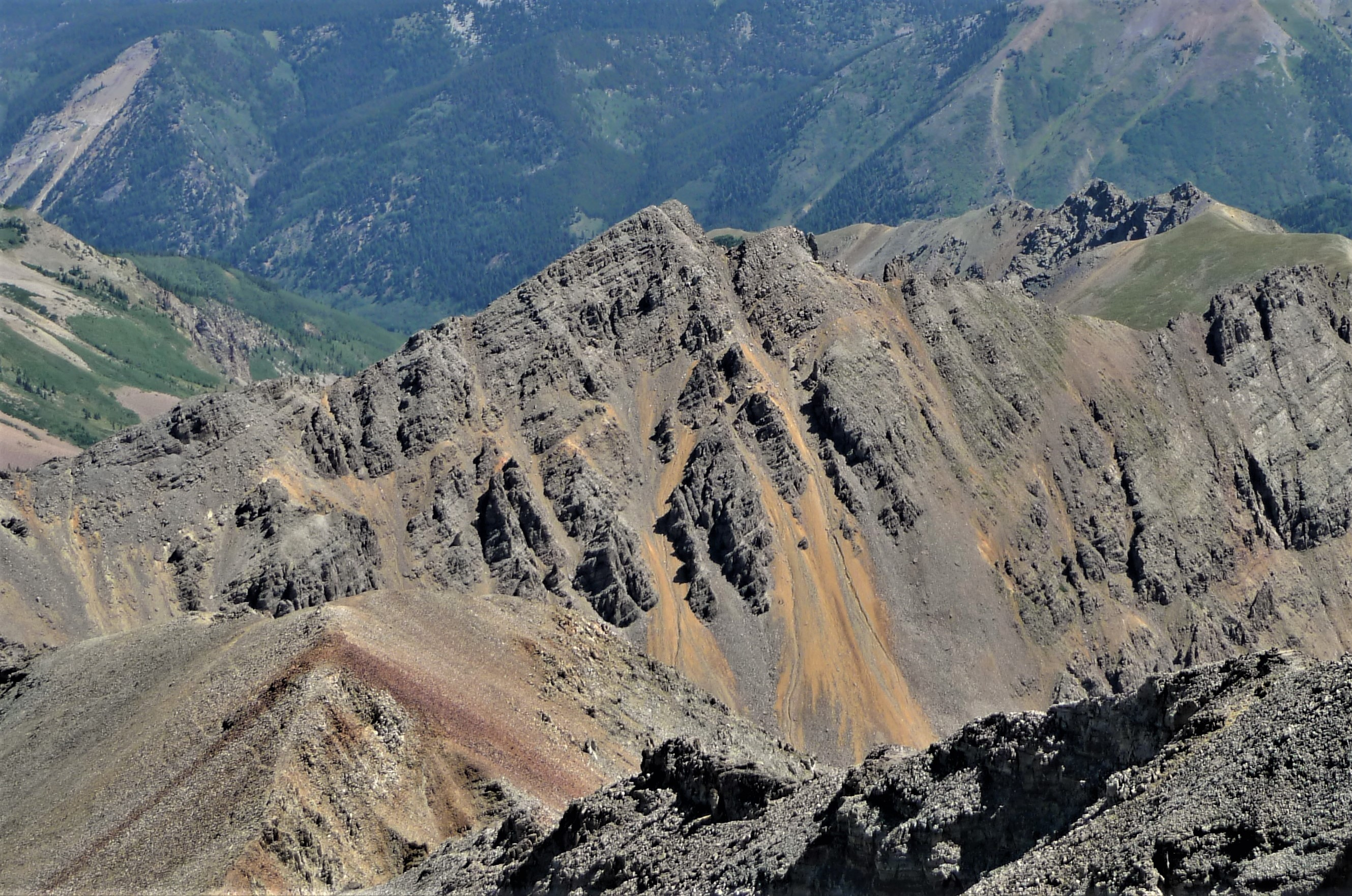
- Southwest aspect, from Castle Peak

Highest point
- Elevation: 13,321 ft (4,060 m)
- Prominence: 333 ft (101 m)
- Parent peak: Castle Peak (14,279 ft)
- Isolation: 1.18 mi (1.90 km)
- Coordinates: 39°01′13″N 106°50′39″W

Geography
- Location within Colorado Location within the United States
- Country: United States
- State: Colorado
- County: Pitkin
- Protected area: Maroon Bells–Snowmass Wilderness
- Parent range: Rocky Mountains; Elk Mountains
- Topo map: USGS Hayden Peak

Climbing
- Easiest route: class 2

Malemute Peak is a 13,321-foot (4,060 m) mountain summit in Pitkin County, Colorado, United States.

== Description ==
Malemute Peak is located 14 miles (23 km) west of the Continental Divide in the Elk Mountains which are a subrange of the Rocky Mountains. The mountain is situated 12 miles (19 km) south of the community of Aspen and 1.2 miles (1.9 km) northeast of Castle Peak. The peak is set in the Maroon Bells–Snowmass Wilderness on land managed by White River National Forest. Precipitation runoff from the mountain's slopes drains into Castle Creek which is a tributary of the Roaring Fork River. Topographic relief is significant as the summit rises 3,300 feet (1,006 m) above Castle Creek in 1.8 miles (2.9 km).

== Etymology ==
The mountain's toponym was officially adopted on March 11, 1976, by the United States Board on Geographic Names and was named in association with sled dog teams operated by Stuart Mace in nearby Ashcroft during the 1950s. Malemute is the less common spelling of malamute.

== Climate ==
According to the Köppen climate classification system, Malemute Peak is located in an alpine subarctic climate zone with cold, snowy winters, and cool to warm summers. Due to its altitude, it receives precipitation all year, as snow in winter and as thunderstorms in summer, with a dry period in late spring.

== See also ==
- Mountains of Pitkin County, Colorado
- Thirteener
