= Maroon Creek Bridge =

Historic Maroon Creek Bridge
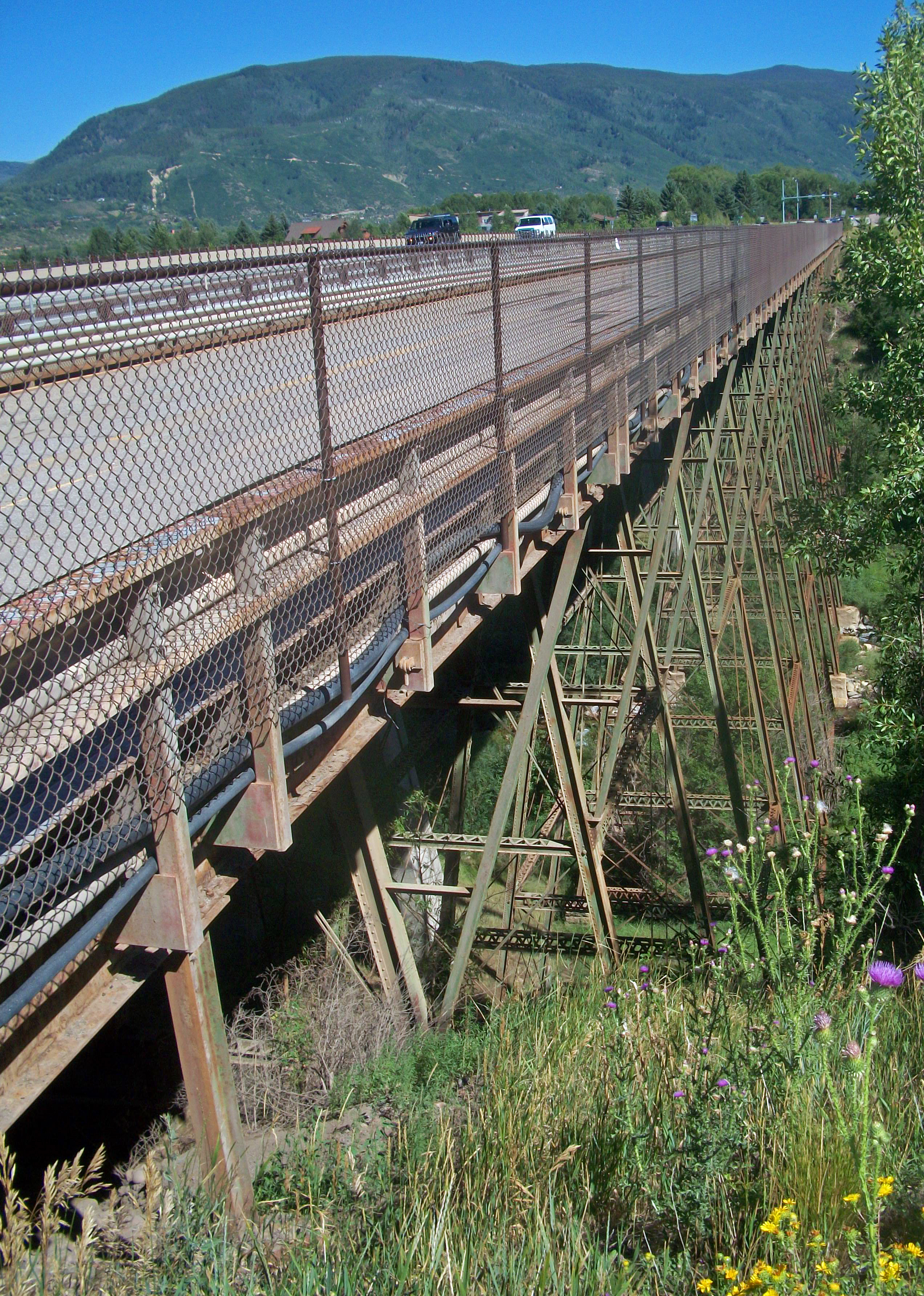
- Bridge from west portal, 2010
- Coordinates: 39°12′4″N 106°50′57″W
- Carries: Pedestrians
- Crosses: Maroon Creek
- Locale: Aspen, CO, USA

Characteristics
- Design: trestle
- Material: Concrete, steel, stone
- Total length: 651 ft (198 m)
- Width: 40 ft (12 m)
- Height: 90 ft (27 m)
- Longest span: 600 ft (180 m)
- No. of spans: 20

History
- Designer: George S. Morison
- Constructed by: Colorado Midland Railroad
- Construction start: 1887
- Construction end: 1888
- Opened: 1888
- Closed: 2008

New Maroon Creek Bridge
- Coordinates: 39°12′5″N 106°50′57″W
- Carries: SH 82
- Crosses: Maroon Creek
- Locale: Aspen, CO, USA
- Maintained by: Colorado Department of Transportation
- ID number: H-09-U

Characteristics
- Design: Box girder
- Total length: approx 610 ft (190 m)
- Width: 73
- Height: approx 90 ft (27 m)
- Longest span: approx 270 ft (82 m)
- No. of spans: 3

History
- Designer: Parsons Transportation Group
- Engineering design by: McNary Bergeron & Associates
- Constructed by: BTE Concrete/Atkinson Construction JV
- Construction start: 2005
- Construction end: 2008
- Opened: 2008

Statistics
- Daily traffic: 22,300 cars daily

The original Maroon Creek Bridge is a steel trestle along State Highway 82 at the western boundary of Aspen, Colorado, United States. It was designed by George S. Morison in 1888 for the Colorado Midland Railroad, one of the last viaducts in Colorado built for a standard gauge mountain railroad in the 19th century. Of the five steel bridges the Midland built, it is the only one still extant. Due to the later removal of most track and the rail depots, the bridge is the most visible remnant of rail service to Aspen. In 1985 it was listed on the National Register of Historic Places along with other highway bridges in the state, including the Sheely Bridge, also in Aspen.

When it was built, the Midland was ahead in its race with the Denver and Rio Grande to make the first rail connection to Aspen, then a booming silver mining center. The Midland had followed the Roaring Fork Valley up from its main line at Glenwood Springs, but was stalled at Maroon Creek by a delay in the bridge steel. The Rio Grande was thus able to make up the difference and bring the first train to Aspen, with the Midland following a few months later.

Aspen's boom years ended a few years later, and by the 1920s the bridge was abandoned. It was soon expanded and converted to use as a road bridge. It served as the main entrance to Aspen for many visitors as the city's economy rebounded when the Aspen Mountain ski resort was developed after World War II. As growth spilled over to Aspen's west, it became a traffic choke point for the region.

It remained in use until longstanding plans for a newer, wider bridge came to fruition in 2008. At that time the original bridge was the oldest one still in use on Colorado's state highways. The award-winning new bridge was designed to be aesthetically similar to its predecessor, which remains in service as a foot bridge. It may be used for a light rail line to further alleviate traffic problems in the valley.

== Structures ==
Both bridges are located adjacent to each other along Highway 82 approximately one-half mile (1 km) east of the traffic circle where Maroon Creek Road, the access route to the Maroon Bells leaves to the south, just outside the developed portion of the city of Aspen. Due west of that are the remnants of the Holden Mining and Smelting Co. facility, also listed on the National Register as a historic district. The city's corporate limit follows the bridge, with the land to the north within Aspen and the south just Pitkin County. The creek flows through a deep gorge below, roughly 1 mile (1.6 km) upstream of where it drains into the Roaring Fork River to the north. On all corners but the southeast are golf courses; that corner has a small residential neighborhood of modern construction.

A steel safety net has been installed since construction of the new bridge in the two-foot (60 cm) gap between the bridges. The original bridge has 20 plate girder spans supported by nine tapered steel piers. Two deep deck girders, iron plate webs with riveted angle flanges and web stiffeners, carry the road. The piers are made up of two bents, their legs made of two back-to-back steel channels with cover plate and double lacing. They are braced by tiers of compression beams and tension eyebars. At the ground they are supported by masonry piers.

The new bridge is 620 feet (190 m) long, 30 feet (10 m) shorter than its older neighbor. It consists of a 270-foot (82 m) main span with two 170-foot (52 m) end spans. Its deck is formed from a 73-foot–wide (22 m) single-cell box girder at a constant depth of 13½ feet (4.1 m) with ribbed elements supporting the long slab spans. Most segments are 15 feet (4.6 m) long, with a deck rib 5 feet (1.5 m) from the leading edge. The segments are laid out on 25-foot (7.6 m) pier table, with eight in the main cantilever, ten in the side spans and a 5-foot segment closing the two cantilevers.

They are supported by A-shaped concrete piers with a capital at the top flared outward at the same angle as the outriggers on the historic bridge. The piers themselves are a constant 10 feet (3 m) in the direction of the bridge but stretch from 6 feet (2 m) at the top to 10 feet (3 m) at the bottom. Their footings are on 12 4-foot–wide (1.2 m) drilled 20 feet (6 m) deep into the bedrock. The abutments on either side of the gorge are supported by 72 8-inch (200 mm) micropiles designed to support 150 kips each.

== History ==
The bridge's history is intertwined with the city it serves. Built during a scramble to exploit its silver deposits, it outlasted the railroads that used it to become the main road entrance to Aspen, eventually becoming their only remnant. Stressed as the city rebounded when it became a popular ski resort, it was later augmented with a modern bridge specifically designed to echo it aesthetically.

=== 1870s–1887: Aspen's boom ===
What would very quickly become the city of Aspen began as one of several mining camps in the upper Roaring Fork Valley established by prospectors drawn west from Leadville, in the late 1870s. The mineral veins there had already been thoroughly exploited, and those first settlers defied an order from governor Frederick Walker Pitkin to cross the Continental Divide at Independence Pass into what was still Ute country. They were drawn by reports of vast silver deposits.

Aspen eventually became the center of settlement in the region due to its location at the confluence of Castle Creek and the Roaring Fork. It was not closest to the Divide or the richest deposits, but it had an ample supply of level ground and forests including the trees that gave it its name, which were readily harvested to build the first log cabins.

The silver was difficult to exploit at first since the ore had to be taken to Leadville to be smelted. The route over the pass was long even in warm weather, and suited only for mule trains (even today, Highway 82 through it is closed during wintertime). Once the smelter at the Holden property was opened in the mid-1880s, mining profits and population grew rapidly, helped by the Sherman Silver Purchase Act's requirement that the federal government purchase the metal. Two railroads, the Colorado Midland and the Denver & Rio Grande Western, began building routes to the remote city, racing to be the first.

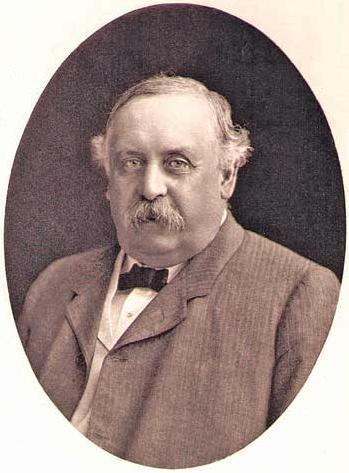
George S. Morison

=== 1887–1893: Bridge construction and early railroad use ===
Formed in 1883, the Midland had existed purely legally for its first four years since it lacked the money to actually build anything. That changed rapidly when James John Hagerman, an Easterner who had already grown rich from mining iron ore in Michigan and silver in Aspen, joined the railroad in 1885. By the end of the next year the Midland had laid 250 miles (400 km) of standard gauge track from Colorado Springs to Leadville. The Hagerman Tunnel, at the time the world's highest, got it across the Divide to Glenwood Springs, where it continued the line to Aspen.

The previous year the Rio Grande had been forced into receivership and sold to its bondholders as a result of growing too fast in its earlier years. William S. Jackson, its new president, had tried to convince the board to expand to Aspen ahead of the Midland, but they were too afraid of further financial failure. The next year a new president, David Moffat, changed their minds and the railroad began laying track on the north side of the Roaring Fork, where they did not have to worry about crossing Maroon Creek.

That decision proved to be beneficial in overcoming the Midland's lead and bringing the first train to Aspen in October 1887. At that point the Midland's crews had laid track almost as far as Maroon Creek. The railroad had hired renowned engineer and bridge designer George S. Morison to design and build the viaduct using his innovative double-bent piers, first used on the Portage Viaduct in New York and later on the Boone Viaduct in Iowa. A timber trestle could have been built, but when the crews reached the creek in December they had to wait as the structural steel for Morison's bridge had been delayed leaving its fabricator back East. They continued working through the difficult mountain winter and completed the bridge in time for the Midland's first train to cross it and arrive in Aspen in February 1888. Although the Midland lost the race, its bridge, one of the last viaduct bridges built in Colorado that century, was more significant since it connected Aspen to its standard-gauge main line, the first built into the state's mountains. In 1890 the Rio Grande widened its branch to standard gauge. The two railroads competed vigorously as the city's population swelled to over 10,000. The Aspen City Railway, a mule-pulled streetcar, connected the two depots.

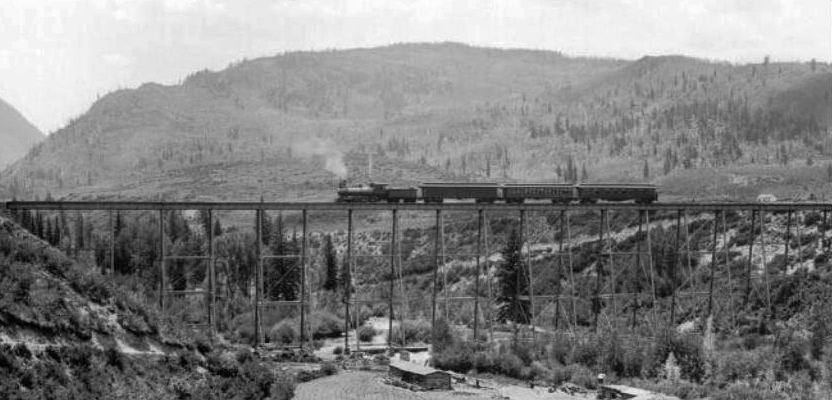
Train crossing the bridge ca. 1900

Aspen's boom years ended in 1893, when Congress repealed the Sherman Silver Purchase Act in response to that year's economic crisis. With the market no longer artificially supported, the price of silver dropped and many of the city's mines closed, beginning a long period of the city's history known as "the quiet years". The railroad, which had recently built the Busk–Ivanhoe Tunnel, which improved service along its main line, continued operating even as it went bankrupt in 1897, and reemerged as a new company with the same name. The second Colorado Midland went bankrupt again in 1919, as most of Aspen's remaining silver mines shut down. The bridge remained, unused.

=== 1894–1946: Road redevelopment and quiet years ===
Ten years later, with the state expanding and improving its highway network in response to growing use of the automobile, the bridge was revived. Drivers began using it during the 1920s, almost as soon as the railroad abandoned it. After being widened with a paved timber deck and the outriggers to accommodate a road, it was reopened in 1929 for road traffic as part of the construction of Highway 82. The goal of the widening was to link Aspen with the state's growing road network and thus improve the prospects of the remaining silver miners. But the onset of the Great Depression stifled any chance of that happening, and both the road and the railroad were primarily used to transport livestock raised by the area's ranchers to market.

The road and railroad would eventually figure in Aspen's economic rebirth, though not from the source originally envisioned. Near the end of the Depression, a local landowner showed some photographs of mountainside property he saw mining potential in to Ted Ryan, an heir to Thomas Fortune Ryan. He was a downhill skiing enthusiast who saw that the slopes would be ideal for development as a ski area. By the end of the decade the first crude ski lift had been built, some Swiss ski instructors hired, and the first trails cut. Members of the Tenth Mountain Division who trained at nearby Camp Hale also came to appreciate Aspen's offerings. After the war, some came back to develop the ski resort established by Walter Paepcke, the president of the Container Corporation of America. He and his wife Elizabeth had found Aspen an ideal place to establish a music festival, and invested heavily in rebuilding the city. Early in 1947, a special train brought dignitaries from out of town, including one of Colorado's U.S. senators and its governor-elect, to Aspen for a ceremony marking the opening of the new chairlift, at the time the world's longest. The breaking of a champagne bottle across the bottom station ended the quiet years.

=== 1946–2003: Resort growth and stresses ===
The Rio Grande ran ski trains, which mixed passenger and freight traffic, up to Aspen from its main line at Glenwood Springs. But many preferred to drive or be driven up Highway 82 from that point. The Aspen Skiing Company developed the greater Aspen/Snowmass complex, including the Buttermilk ski area just west of the bridge in 1958 and Snowmass further west, both contributing to traffic over the bridge.

The bridge's importance as the gateway to Aspen increased further when Aspen–Pitkin County Airport was built in 1953 just outside the city. Over the 1950s the population of Pitkin County grew 44%, due to migration to the upper Roaring Fork Valley, the second highest growth rate on Colorado's Western Slope. Ten years after the airport was opened, in 1963, the bridge was expanded to its current width to handle the traffic increase. Ranchers began selling their lands for skiing and housing development, some of which became the town of Snowmass, where the workers in Aspen's hotels, restaurants and shops settled, eventually incorporating in the mid-1970s. Aspen became a destination for more than just skiing, and its population continued to grow.

In 1969 eight decades of rail transport to Aspen came to an end when the Rio Grande ran its last train from the city, a development that attracted less local attention than the first trains had. The tracks were removed and its depot demolished, leaving the bridge as the only significant remnant of Aspen's railroad era. When the railroad finally turned its Rio Grande Zephyr service between Denver and Salt Lake City over to Amtrak in 1983, the last private intercity rail route to do so, Amtrak did not restore service to Aspen. Service along the branch was finally abandoned completely when the last coal train left Carbondale in 1994, ending the Roaring Fork Valley's railroad era.

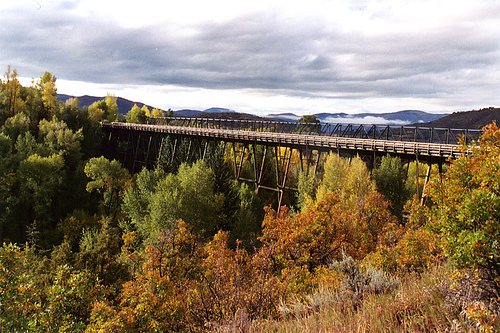
Bridge from southeast shortly before construction of new bridge

By that time the bridge was showing its age. Traffic across the bridge grew at an average annual rate of 4.4% during the 1980s. In 1990 the Colorado Department of Transportation (CDOT) released a plan for a new bridge at the site. The twin three-span steel box girder concept did not meet with public approval due to concerns about its aesthetics, environmental impact and effect on other roads of traffic diverted during construction, since its closure would necessitate a long detour on local roads through Woody Creek.

Drivers on the bridge also had to contend with pedestrian users. The roadway was too narrow to install a sidewalk or walkway. In 1998 a pedestrian bridge of eight 82-foot (25 m) segments was built immediately to the north. It was a temporary solution to the increasing traffic problem and was never very popular locally.

In the first years of the 21st century its sufficiency rating slipped to 9 out of a possible 100. It was temporarily closed to trucks while cracks in the masonry at the piers' base were repaired, restoring it to a sufficiency rating of 24. In 2004, after the municipal governments of Aspen and Snowmass decided to fund the design work, CDOT announced that it was expediting the planning process and hoped that construction would begin the following year. Traffic could continue to use the old bridge in the meantime. There were some objections to the disruption that would be caused pedestrians, since the old pedestrian bridge would have to be dismantled.

=== 2004–present: The new bridge ===
Ultimately, a cast-in-place segmental concrete box girder design was decided on. The piers were tapered to echo the pinched-waist appearance of the old trestle next to it. Construction began in late 2005. Environmental considerations required that no more than 0.2 acres (810 m^{2}) of the protected wetland below the bridge be disturbed during construction, and half that area be permanently disturbed for the bridge piers. The bridge was therefore built from the top down, using a balanced cantilever construction method. To allow concrete construction to continue through the winter, the contractor insulated the forms and ran glycol-filled pipes along their exteriors.

By late 2007, two years after work started, the main span was done. The entire bridge was completed in early 2008. Up to that point, the 120-year-old bridge remained in use, the oldest still in use on Colorado's state highways.

After construction of new road approaches, including designated bus lanes, the new bridge opened in the middle of the year, its final cost almost $14 million. as the Colorado Department of Transportation had classified it as "unstable" at near capacity. After the new bridge (a concrete box girder bridge) was completed, the existing bridge was left in place to honor its historic designation. In 2010, CDOT won a Bridge Award for Excellence from the National Segmental Bridge Institute.

In late 2010 a body found under the bridge was identified as George Aldrich, a ski-lift operator who had recently moved to Snowmass from Rhode Island. He had been missing for over two weeks since getting off a bus near the bridge following a night of drinking with friends in Aspen. The county coroner ruled that he had died from injuries sustained in a fall, which had likely occurred when a heavily intoxicated Aldrich accidentally stepped in the gap between the two bridges in the dark. CDOT later installed the safety netting between the two bridges to prevent similar accidents in the future.

== Future ==
Rail transport may yet return to the bridge. In 1975 Aspen voters approved a referendum permitting the city to endorse the county's application to the federal Urban Mass Transportation Authority for the funding of a light rail system to connect downtown Aspen to the airport, and perhaps the Buttermilk ski area and eventually all the way to Glenwood Springs using either of the old rights-of-way. Later votes endorsed other aspects of the proposal. In 1997 the Federal Highway Administration and CDOT issued a Record of Decision (ROD) in favor of a light-rail network and improvements to Highway 82, including the new bridge eventually built. The light rail line would likely use the old bridge and the old Midland route where it exists, since those tracks had already accounted for the steep grades in the valley, not a common problem with light-rail lines.

After the ROD, another referendum found city voters still supporting light rail but county voters opposed. The federal government nonetheless set aside funding for the segment to the airport, which would have been the first rural light rail line built in the U.S. Later referendums on bond issues to fund the city's portion failed, and after the failure of another referendum to build a monorail between Denver and ski resorts along I-70 the project did not seem likely to begin until money was available from another source.

Segments of the former pedestrian bridge are being reused. One was sold for scrap and four others were used as part of a pedestrian bridge across the Roaring Fork near Basalt. Three others are in storage; the county is considering using them to replace an old bridge along the Brush Creek Path in Snowmass.

== See also ==
- List of bridges on the National Register of Historic Places in Colorado
- National Register of Historic Places listings in Pitkin County, Colorado
