= Colorado State Highway 82 =

State highway in Colorado, United States

State Highway 82
- SH 82 highlighted in red

Route information
- Maintained by CDOT
- Length: 85.293 mi (137.266 km)
- Existed: 1927–present

Major junctions
- West end: I-70 / US 6 in Glenwood Springs
- SH 133 near Carbondale
- East end: US 24 near Granite

Location
- Country: United States
- State: Colorado
- Counties: Garfield, Eagle, Pitkin, Lake

Highway system
- Colorado State Highway System; Interstate; US; State; Scenic
| ← SH 79 | → SH 83 |

State Highway 82 (SH 82) is an 85.3-mile-long (137.3 km) state highway in the U.S. state of Colorado. Its western half provides the principal transportation artery of the Roaring Fork Valley on the Colorado Western Slope, beginning at Interstate 70 (I-70) and U.S. Highway 6 (US 6) in Glenwood Springs southeast past Carbondale, Basalt and Aspen. From there it continues up the valley to cross the Continental Divide at Independence Pass. On the Eastern Slope, it follows Lake Creek past some of Colorado's highest mountains to Twin Lakes Reservoir, where it ends at US 24 south of Leadville.

At 12,095 feet (3,687 m) above sea level, the traverse of Independence Pass is the highest paved crossing of the Continental Divide in North America, and the highest paved through road on Colorado's state highway network. The pass is closed during the winter months, isolating Aspen from the east and making Highway 82 the only way to reach the popular ski resort town by road. A private foundation has worked with the Colorado Department of Transportation (CDOT), which maintains the road, to undo environmental damage to the alpine tundra created when a disused stagecoach route built across the pass during the Colorado Silver Boom of the 1880s became Highway 82 in the early 20th century.

West of Aspen the highway follows the route of an early Colorado Midland Railroad route from the city to Glenwood Springs. Paved during the 1930s, this road has been gradually expanded to four lanes over the course of the 20th and early 21st centuries. The increased traffic resulting from Aspen's economic rebirth as a resort town has required high-occupancy vehicle lanes, bypasses and the replacement of at least one old bridge. More improvements are planned for both Aspen and Glenwood Springs.

== Route description ==
From its western terminus to Aspen, Highway 82 is a four-lane road, frequently divided. As it leaves Aspen, it narrows to two lanes and remains that way to its eastern terminus. Two sets of gates on either side of Independence Pass allow the road to be closed in winter.

=== Glenwood Springs to Carbondale ===
Highway 82 begins at Exit 116 from I-70 in Glenwood Springs, just 300 ft (91 m) east of the Roaring Fork's confluence with the Colorado River. It follows Laurel Street north for one block, then turns east on Sixth Street for another block, after which it turns south on Grand Avenue. From there it crosses both I-70 and the Colorado River on a viaduct past the train station into downtown Glenwood Springs.

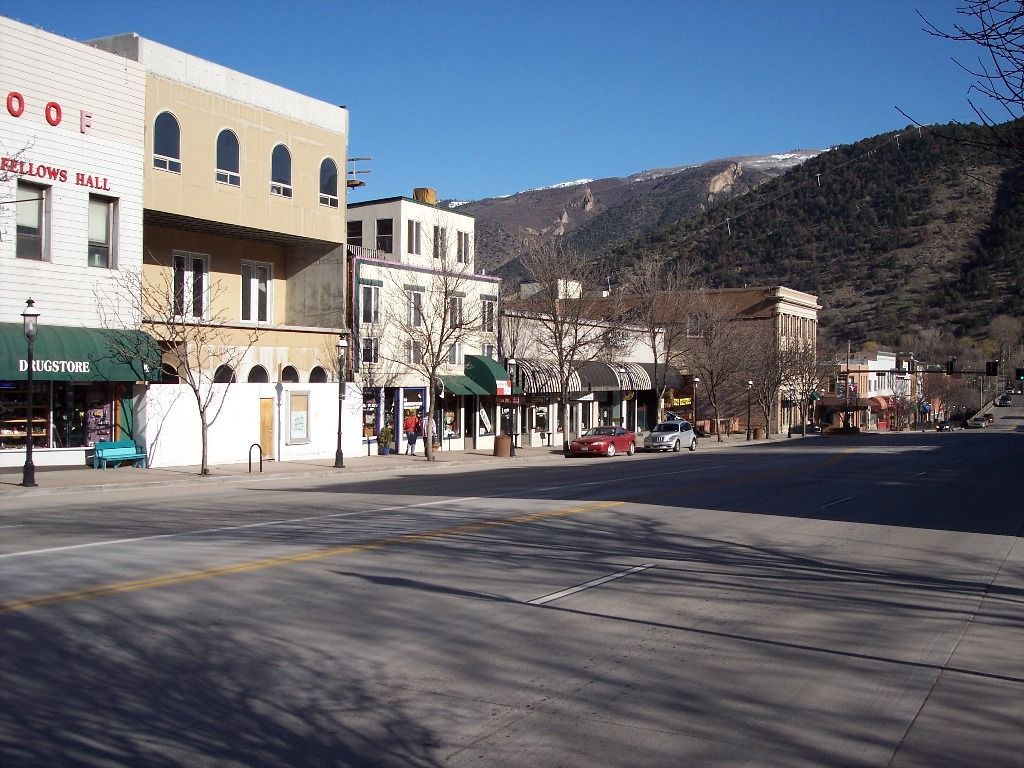
Downtown Glenwood Springs

It continues south through blocks of small-scale dense urban development to 14th Street. Glenwood Springs High School is on the west just past the intersection heralds the end of downtown. For two blocks the land around the road becomes a commercial strip with large parking lots. At Hyland Park on the east just afterwards, the land across the road is devoted to larger houses on larger lots. Strip development resumes on the west side south of 19th Street, two blocks west of Valley View Hospital. At 23rd Street, Highway 82 turns southeast to follow South Glen Avenue, paralleling the adjacent Rio Grande rail trail. Development along the highway becomes predominantly commercial, and south of 27th Street a continuous strip begins on the east side as the valley narrows. After passing Rosebud Cemetery on the west side, Highway 82 turns more to the southeast and draws alongside the Roaring Fork as it reaches the city limits.

Following the river's bend, the road returns to its southern heading as most development focuses around Glenwood Springs Municipal Airport on the opposite bank. At its next easterly turn, the landscape around the road becomes more rural, with farms and golf courses appearing. The terrain remains generally level, at about 6,000 feet (1,800 m) above sea level.

A mile south of the airport, at a signalized intersection with Old State Route 82, the road divides. Highway 82 turns eastward again, returning to its southerly heading after another mile when Spring Valley Road turns off to the Glenwood Springs campus of Colorado Mountain College in the mountains to the north. A half-mile (1 km) beyond that junction, at the headquarters of the Garfield County Road and Bridge District, the highway begins a long stretch with a southerly heading.

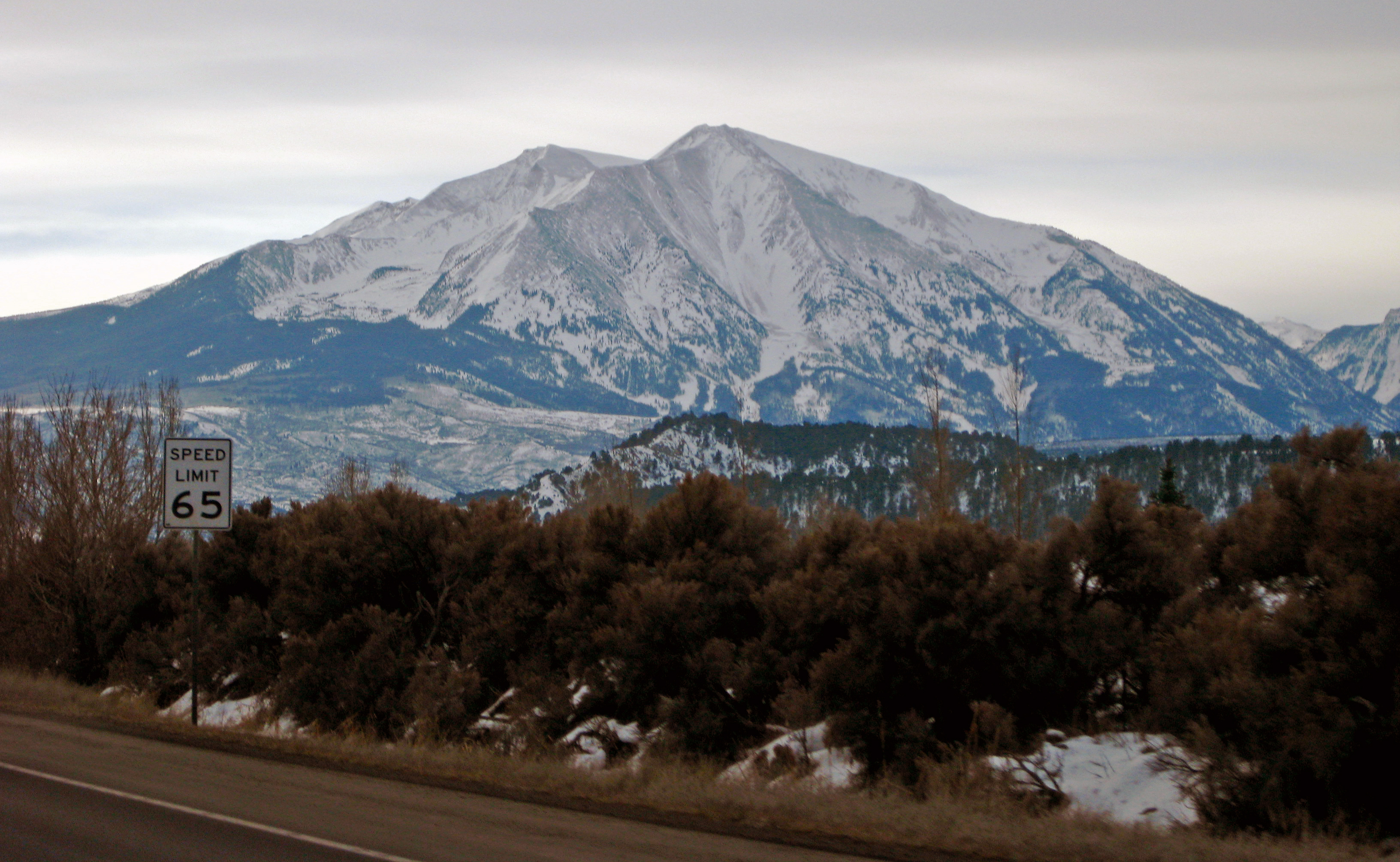
Mount Sopris from Highway 82 in winter

After two miles, the road bends to the southeast amidst a valley with occasional subdivisions. Two more miles down the highway, at a rest area, Highway 82 turns east as it enters the city of Carbondale across the river. A mile from the rest area, a traffic signal controls the intersection with State Highway 133, the only other state highway to intersect 82 for its entire length. From Carbondale, Highway 133 leads south to Redstone and McClure Pass along the valley of a tributary of the Roaring Fork, the Crystal River. To the south the 12,953-foot (3,948 m) Mount Sopris dominates the view.

=== Carbondale to Aspen ===
A mile east of Highway 133, the valley floor widens, filled with farms and subdivisions as the road gently trends to the south. Five miles (8.0 km) east of Carbondale, Highway 82 crosses into Eagle County. Subdivisions begin to increase in the surrounding valley and the road soon turns to the south again as it passes a built-up area and then crosses the Roaring Fork. A mile and a half after that Highway 82 crosses the Roaring Fork, and then enters Pitkin County at the small unincorporated community of Emma.

Basalt is one mile due east. The intersection with Basalt Avenue, the main route into that town from Highway 82, has a signal. Between Glenwood Springs and Basalt, Highway 82 climbs 600 feet (180 m) in elevation. As it alternately tracks southeast and south over the next 16 miles (26 km) towards Aspen, it begins to climb more noticeably and the valley narrows. Development becomes less dense, with many small ranches located aside the road and along the river. Three miles (4.8 km) south of Basalt, after another crossing of the Roaring Fork, the right lanes in both directions are marked with diamonds indicating they are high-occupancy vehicle lanes during peak hours. The median is soon replaced with a guardrail, then a brief retaining wall where the eastbound roadway is slightly elevated.

The ascent continues near Woody Creek. As Aspen–Pitkin County Airport appears on the west of the road, three miles (4.8 km) south of Woody Creek, the roadways merge as development around the highway increases.

Beyond the airport, Highway 82 turns due south. It bends to the southeast to cross the new Maroon Creek Bridge, with the original, listed on the National Register of Historic Places, immediately to its south. At this point, with a golf course on the north side, the Aspen city limit begins to follow the road, and by the time it goes through a roundabout and passes the Holden/Marolt Mining and Ranching Museum to the south it is fully in the city of Aspen. Another stream crossing, Castle Creek, brings the highway into the developed portion of the city.

=== Aspen to Independence Pass ===
From Basalt, Highway 82 has climbed 1,300 feet (400 m). It levels out at Aspen, entering the city's residential West End along West Hallam Street. A block east of Castle Creek, it turns south on North Seventh Street; the intersection's southwest corner has been rounded to smooth the traffic flow, leaving a triangular traffic island in the middle of the road. Two blocks further south, at another intersection with a rounded corner, SH 82 turns east to follow West Main Street across Aspen.

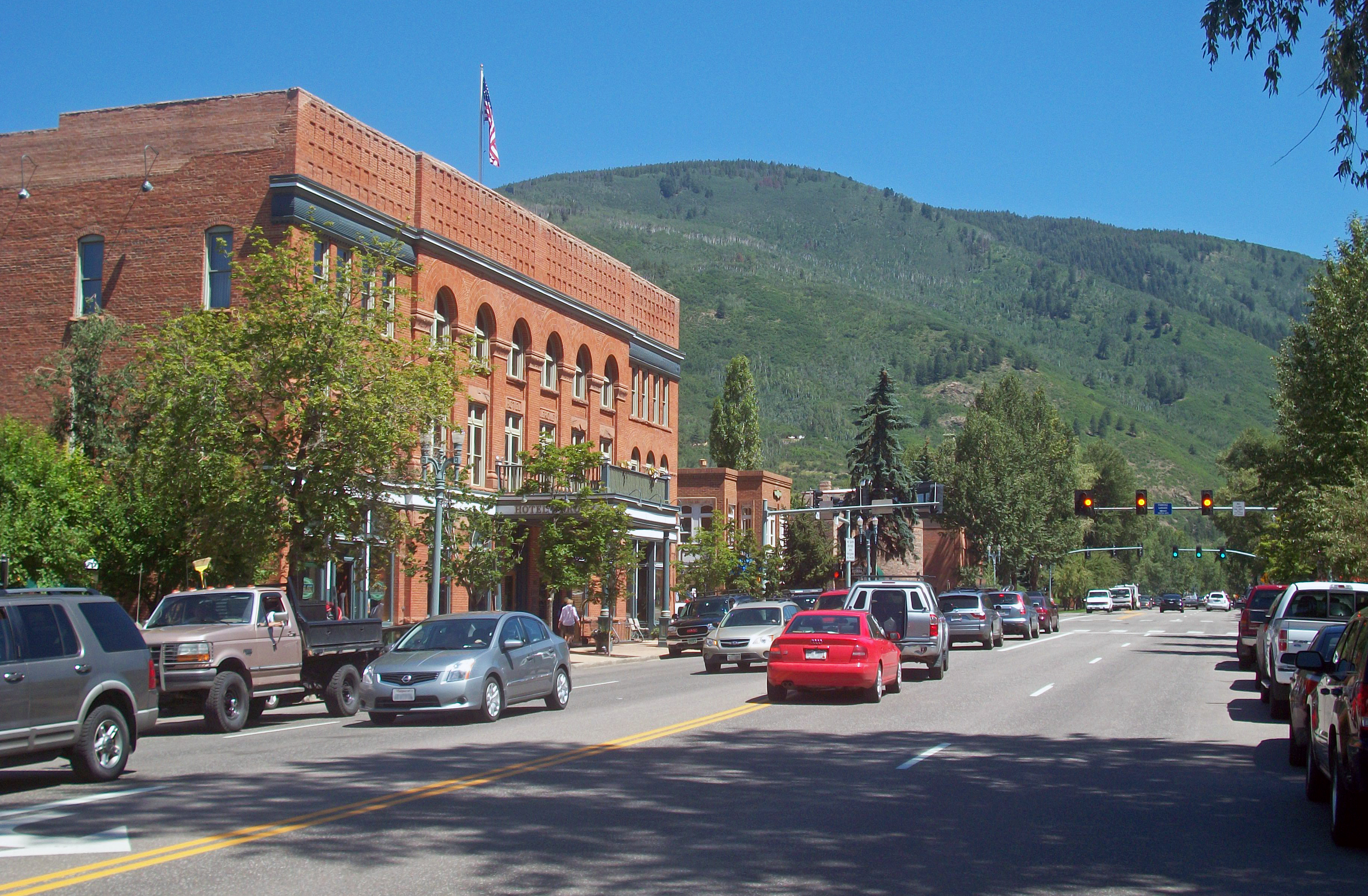
Main Street and the Hotel Jerome in Aspen

Five blocks east, at Garmisch Street, it becomes East Main Street. The buildings gradually change from residential to commercial, and at Mill Street Highway 82 passes one of Aspen's major landmarks, the Hotel Jerome, also listed on the National Register. Two blocks further is another listed landmark, the Pitkin County Courthouse, between Galena and Hunter streets.

After the Spring Street intersection another two blocks past the courthouse, Main Street curves to the south, narrowing in the process. It is now a two-lane road. Two blocks to the south, SH 82 turns east again to follow East Cooper Avenue, crossing the Roaring Fork again after another two blocks. The highway curves southward, leaving Aspen three-quarters of a mile (1.1 km) further east.

The valley narrows into a canyon as the road begins to climb again, closely hugging the north wall. Four miles (6.4 km) east of the city, just past Targert Lake Road, it passes the gates where the road is closed in wintertime. Past this point development along the road abates as most of the land alongside the road is part of White River National Forest. On the north side of the road are some of Aspen's more popular climbing cliffs; on the south side are many small parking areas for trailheads, campgrounds, and popular swimming holes along the Roaring Fork like Devil's Punchbowl.

There are several short sections where past rockslides have forced the road to narrow to one lane. Access is controlled via traffic lights. The remaining log cabins and other structures of the ghost town of Independence, also listed on the National Register, are visible in the valley below at 13.5 miles (21.7 km) east of Aspen.

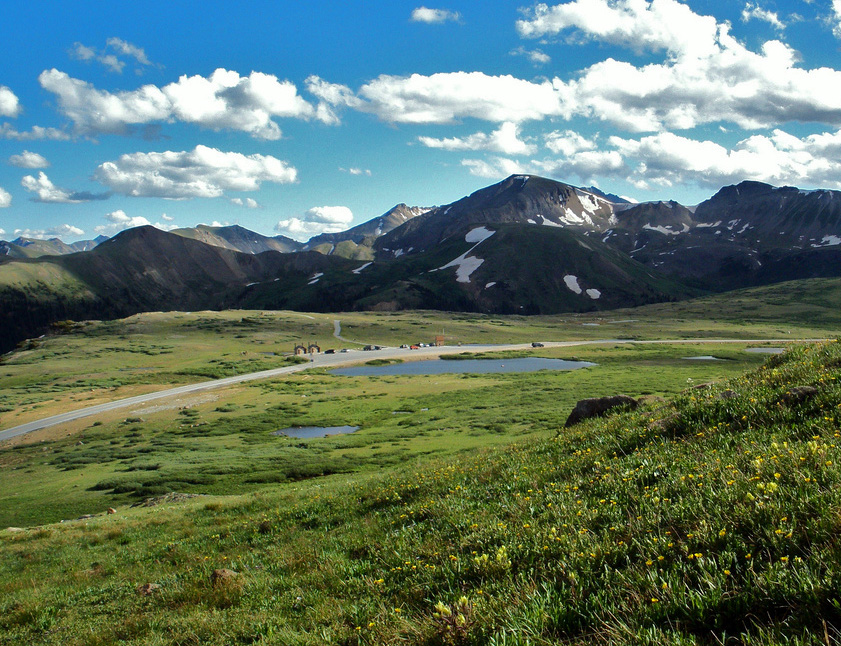
Independence Pass

Shortly afterwards, Highway 82 crosses the Roaring Fork for the last time, a few miles below its source at Independence Lake. The road then turns along the canyon's headwall to the south. After a switchback to the north, it climbs above tree-line and into the high-elevation alpine tundra landscape of Independence Pass, 19 miles (31 km) from Aspen.

=== Independence Pass to Twin Lakes ===
The road levels out to a parking area on the south side. A U.S. Forest Service sign indicates the Continental Divide and gives the elevation as 12,095 feet (3,687 m). The Divide also marks the Lake County line. A paved path leads to a scenic overlook with views to Mount Elbert (14,440 feet (4,400 m)) and La Plata Peak (14,336 feet (4,370 m)), respectively the highest and fifth-highest peaks in Colorado and the Rocky Mountains. An old road leads south along the ridge to summits to the south.

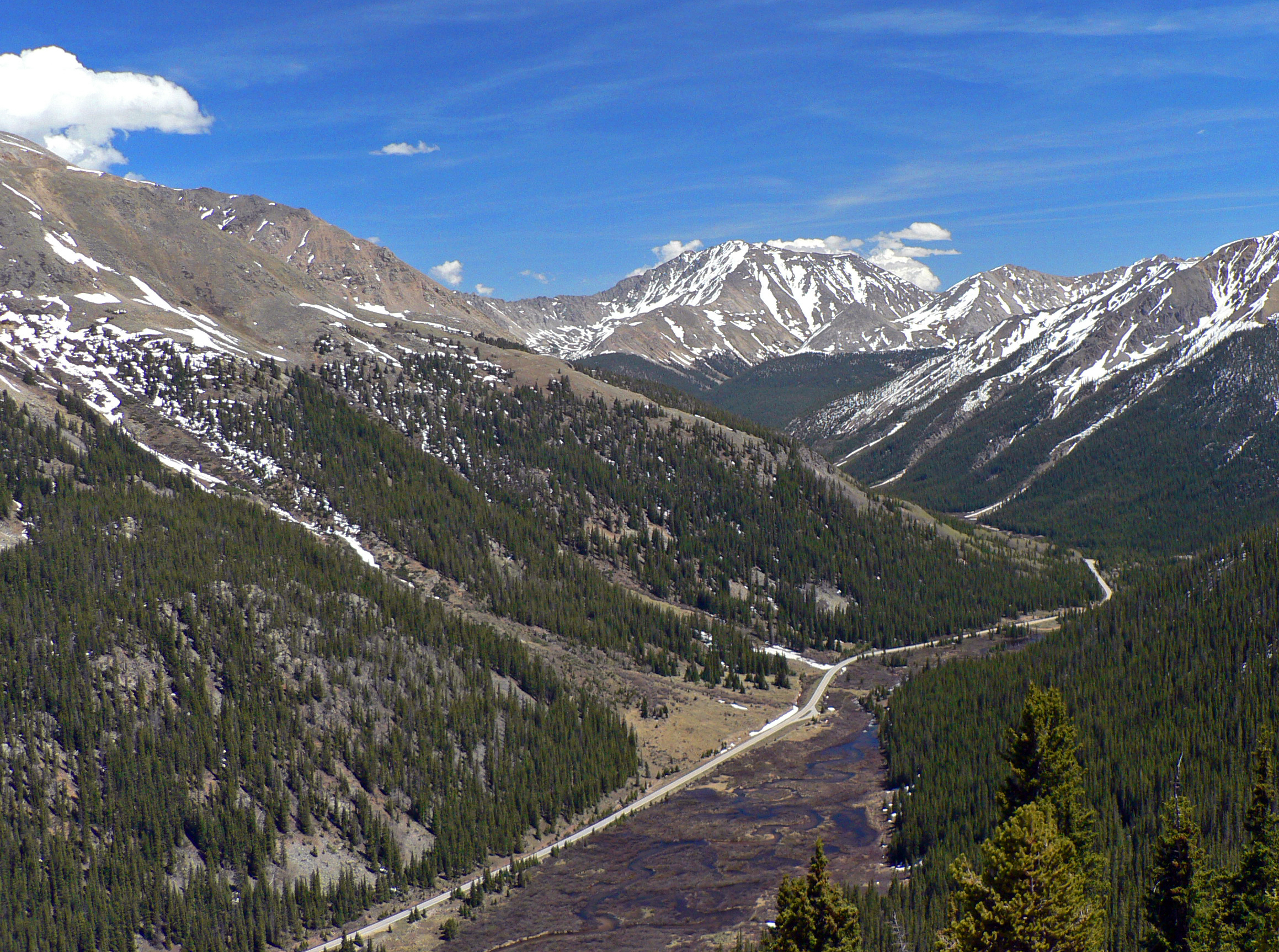
Highway 82 just east of Independence Pass

Beyond the pass, the road descends through three more long switchbacks to the floor of the Lake Creek valley. From there it heads south at first but quickly curving to the east. As it assumes that heading it passes the other set of gates, just west of the very small settlement of Everett, near where Lake Creek's North Fork joins the main stream.

From there the road heads east for the next four miles, passing trailheads for both of the fourteeners on either side and other San Isabel National Forest facilities. Just before the creek widens and empties into Twin Lakes Reservoir, the road curves quickly to the south and then heads more to the northeast along the lake shore. A mile past that bend Highway 82 reaches the small community of Twin Lakes, also listed on the National Register as a historic district as an early tourist town.

The highway continues northeast for another mile beyond Twin Lakes and then turns east, with a continuous view of the lakes on the south. Shortly past this turn, the Colorado Trail crosses the road and then runs closely parallel to it along the south side. Forest Service roads go down that direction to access points along the lake. After another mile, Highway 82 turns southeast for its next mile. Below the lakes' outlet, it crosses Lake Creek for the last time and then ends at US 24 18 miles (29 km) from Independence Pass and just below the confluence of the creek and the Arkansas River. Leadville is 16 miles (26 km) to the north; in the opposite direction it is 21 miles (34 km) to Buena Vista.

== Independence Pass closures and restrictions ==
Independence Pass

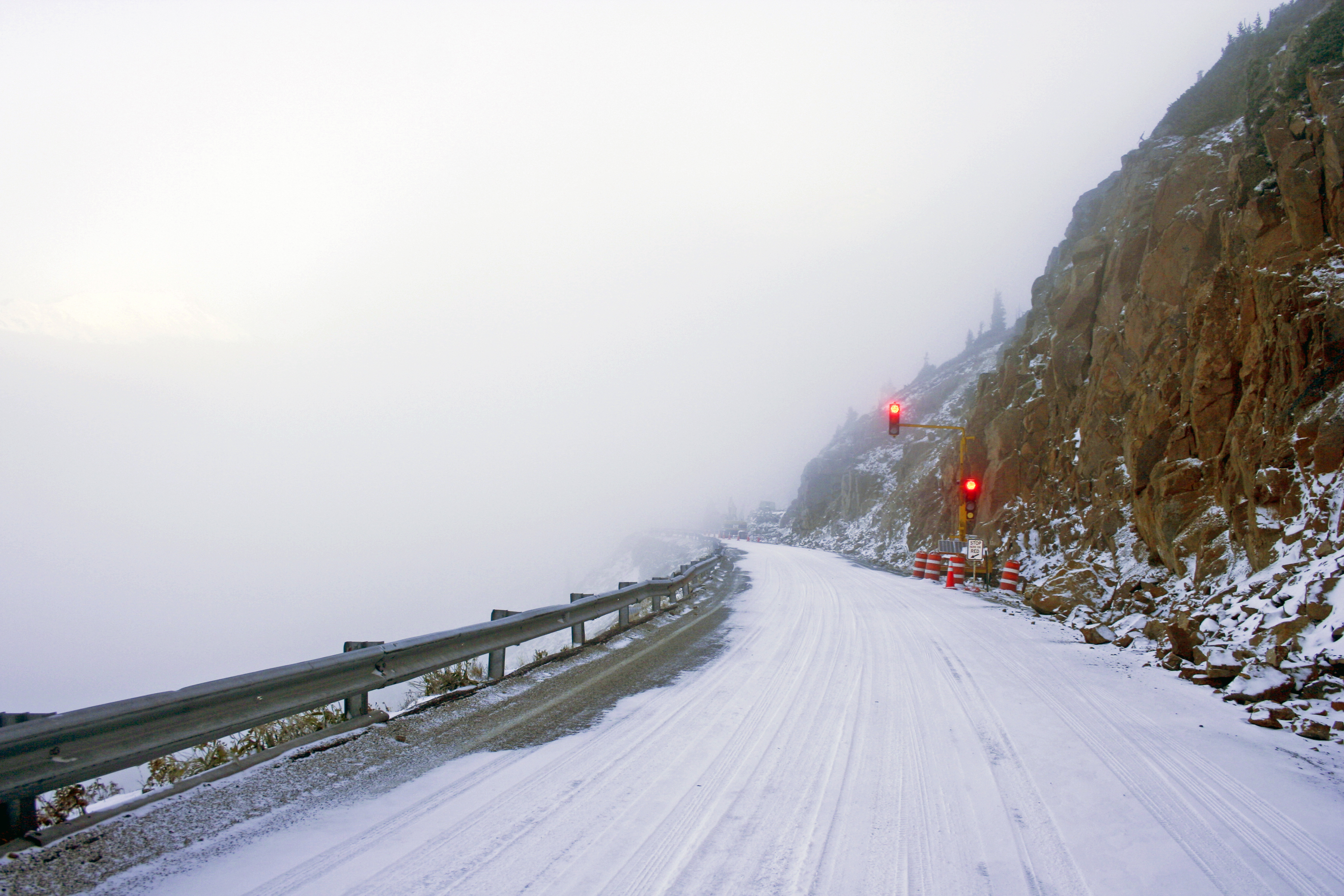
Snow on narrow section of western approach in September

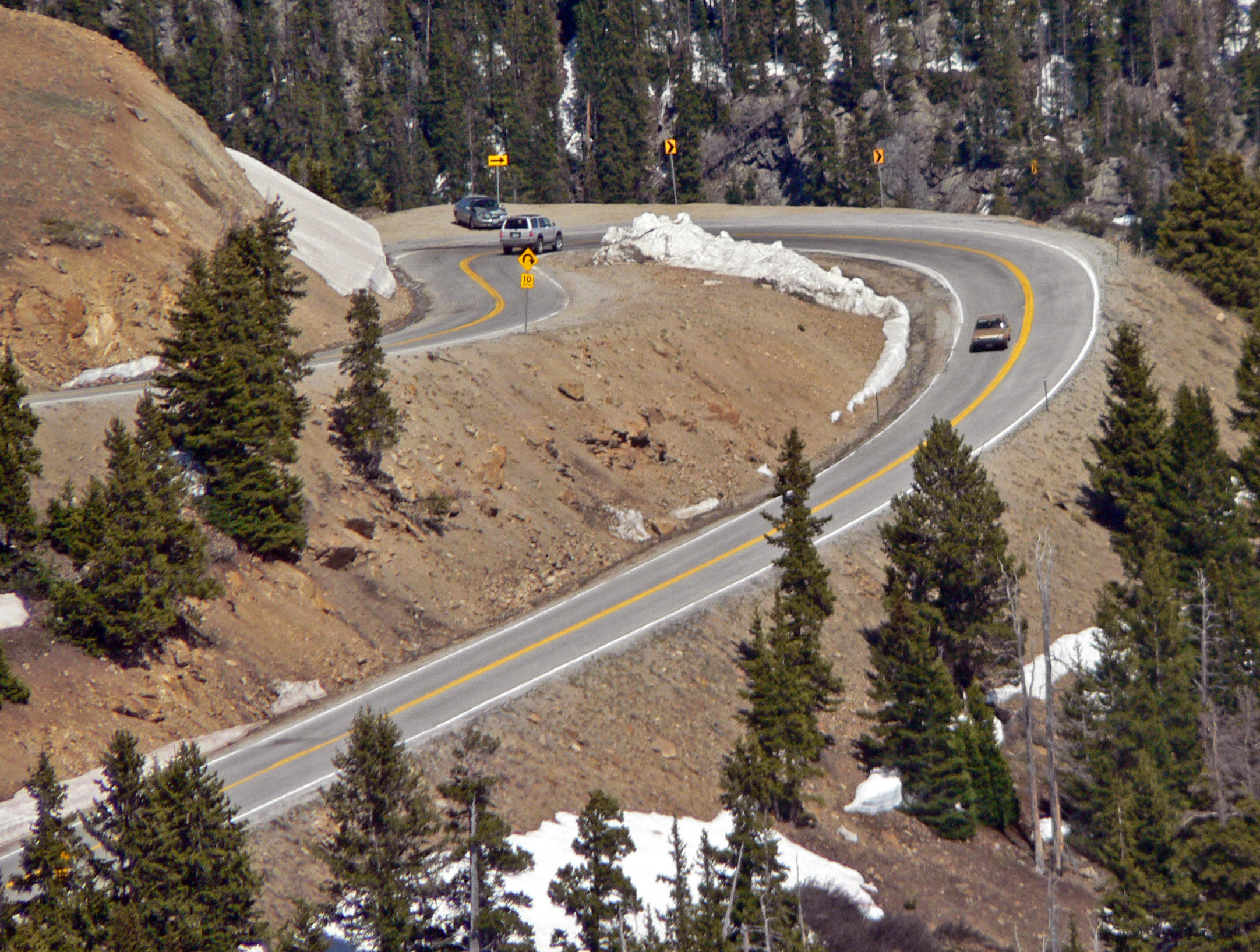
Switchback on eastern approach

Because of the high altitude of Independence Pass, winter weather there begins well before the season itself starts. The snow falls deep through the season, and remains so throughout the spring. The Colorado Department of Transportation (CDOT) therefore closes the gates at both ends of the 24-mile (39 km) stretch of Highway 82 leading over the pass during those months. Typically it is closed by November 7 or the first significant winter snowfall, if that comes earlier. The pass is usually reopened just before Memorial Day weekend at the end of May after CDOT has cleared the snowpack and repaired the road. Some years when the snowfall has been lighter, the reopening has occurred several weeks earlier.

The narrow roadway, switchbacks, steep 6% grades and steep, sometimes unguarded dropoffs on either approach to the pass have also led CDOT to post 10 mph (16 km/h) advisory speeds at the turns. Some types of vehicles are banned from the pass year-round. Oversized and overweight vehicles are prohibited, as well as any vehicle or vehicle combinations longer than 35 feet (11 m). As a practical matter this includes tractor trailers, buses and recreational vehicles.

Some truck drivers have used the pass despite the prohibition. They are generally either unaware of the restriction and following routes plotted by their GPS devices, or aware of it and willing to risk the fine for the sake of the time and distance saved. The resulting accidents have forced the closure of the pass. CDOT has put in larger signs advising drivers of the ban and worked with GPS device manufacturers so their software notes the restriction. Aspen officials have suggested the fines be increased as well.

Independence Pass is popular with bicyclists, and since 2011 it has been on the route of the USA Pro Cycling Challenge around Colorado. Racers cross the pass during a 131-mile (211 km) stage from Gunnison to Aspen. The highway is closed for the race from its western terminus to the end of the stage.

== History ==
Both halves of the road trace their origins to the early days of Aspen's settlement in the 1880s during the Colorado Silver Boom. Prospectors who had missed out on the earlier mining boom that built Leadville began to head west, drawn by reports of vast untapped silver deposits in the Roaring Fork Valley just beyond the Continental Divide. They began crossing what was then known as Hunter Pass, in defiance of an order from Governor Frederick Walker Pitkin not to do so until the federal government had negotiated a peace treaty with the Ute people.

=== 1879–1888: Precursor routes to Aspen ===
The future eastern half of Highway 82 came first, as a rough path over Independence Pass that soon reached Aspen. A private company improved it into a toll road for stagecoaches, open year-round. The city's rapid growth fostered a race to make the first rail connection, which displaced the toll road as the primary route to Aspen within a decade. Later, the railroad's right-of-way would serve as the basis for the highway.

==== Stage road over Independence Pass ====
On July 4, 1879, the settlement of Independence was established just west of the pass, taking its name from the Independence Day holiday, and soon lending it to the pass among other natural features in the area. Independence's gold deposits were quickly opened by miners. By the following year the Twin Lakes and Roaring Fork Toll Company had improved the path through the pass, which followed a route close to Highway 82's present alignment, to the point that horses could make the trip.

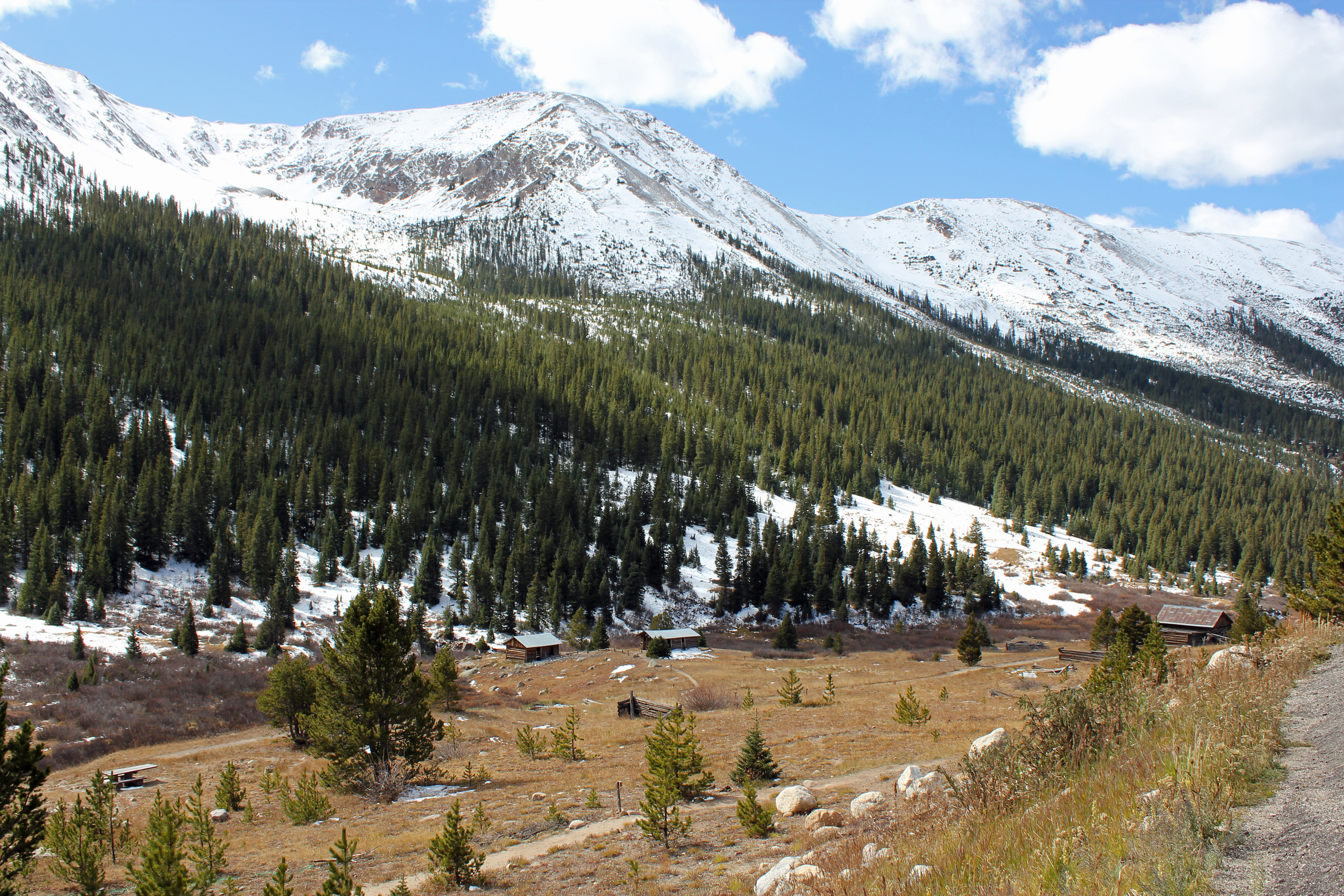
The ghost town that remains of Independence today, as seen from Highway 82 in 2011

The company's goal was to continue down the valley and connect to some existing mining camps such as Ashcroft. Miners had preferred to take a longer route there from Leadville, via Cottonwood and Taylor passes to the south. A viable route over Independence Pass would shorten that journey by 40 miles (64 km).

Settlement continued to follow the river down the valley. At the confluence with Castle Creek, the valley widened and offered a flood plain conducive to the development of a town. The slopes of the surrounding mountains proved to have the silver deposits the prospectors had anticipated, and very soon the mining camp became a small city, named Aspen after the trees that filled the surrounding forests. It grew rapidly, becoming the seat of the newly created Pitkin County, named after the governor its earliest settlers had disobeyed by coming there.

With more and more people coming to Aspen, a better road from the east was needed. An early investor in the city, B. Clark Wheeler, put up the money needed to improve the path over the pass to a stage road. It opened in November 1881, just as winter was beginning. The tolls, 25 cents for saddle horses and twice that for stages ($8 and $17 in modern dollars respectively) were primarily spent hiring a large crew of men who kept the pass clear in winter with snowshovels. They were able to keep the road through the pass open during its first five winters. In deep enough snow passengers switched to sleighs; in summer, dogs ran in advance to warn oncoming traffic through the pass itself as the stages took the switchbacks at full speed. It usually took a stage 10–25 hours and five changes of horses to reach Aspen from Twin Lakes.

==== Rail routes from Glenwood Springs ====
The road over the pass was barely capable of handling the massive amounts of silver ore coming out of Aspen's mines. At first they had to be taken to Leadville by mule train to be smelted. Plants were built in the city soon afterwards, but it was still difficult and expensive to transport the silver obtained. The market was growing in the wake of the Sherman Silver Purchase Act, which required the U.S. government to buy the metal on a regular basis.

A railroad link to Aspen was therefore likely to be highly profitable, and two railroads, the Colorado Midland and the Denver & Rio Grande Western, hoped to be the first. In the early 1880s, however, neither seemed able to do so. The Midland was a paper railroad with no money to build anything. The Rio Grande was building, but too quickly, forcing it into receivership. Financially cautious from its recent troubles, it chose not to build to Aspen despite its president's enthusiasm for the project.

New leadership at both companies started the race to Aspen. James John Hagerman joined the Midland in 1885, refreshing the company coffers with his mining fortune. A year later the railroad had laid 250 miles (400 km) of track from Colorado Springs to Leadville and crossed the Continental Divide via the Hagerman Tunnel, then the world's highest. It got to Glenwood Springs and began working its way up the valley to Aspen.

David Moffat became the Rio Grande's president in 1885 and persuaded the company's other executives to go ahead with the Aspen connection. To overcome the Midland's lead, they built a narrow-gauge line on the north side of the Roaring Fork, today the route of the Rio Grande Trail. Both the gauge and the elimination of the Maroon Creek crossing, which was causing complications for the Midland, saved considerable time, and the Rio Grande managed to bring the first train to Aspen in October 1887. Working through the winter, the Midland finished the Maroon Creek Bridge and got its standard-gauge line into Aspen five months later.

=== 1889–1926: Abandonment and reuse as state highway ===
The opening of the rail connections was a death blow to the stage road. Gold production in Independence had declined sharply after 1884, and many of the town's early settlers had moved down the valley to Aspen. With the corresponding reduction in stage traffic and tolls, the Twin Lakes and Roaring Fork Toll Company could not afford to keep the road clear over the winter of 1886. Two years later, after the railroads began service, the company folded and abandoned the road. Independence itself met the same fate a decade later when its remaining population decamped to Aspen during the severe winter of 1899, leaving its buildings standing as a ghost town (one remaining resident lingered until 1920).

On the other side of Aspen, the railroads initially enjoyed great success. The Rio Grande line was upgraded to standard gauge in 1890, and for the next several years both it and the Midland were at capacity. But when the Panic of 1893 began, Congress repealed the Sherman Silver Purchase Act, instantly collapsing the silver market. Many Aspen mines closed, and miners left the city for new boomtowns like Cripple Creek. The ensuing decades saw a steady decline in Aspen's population, a period referred to as the "quiet years" of the city's history.

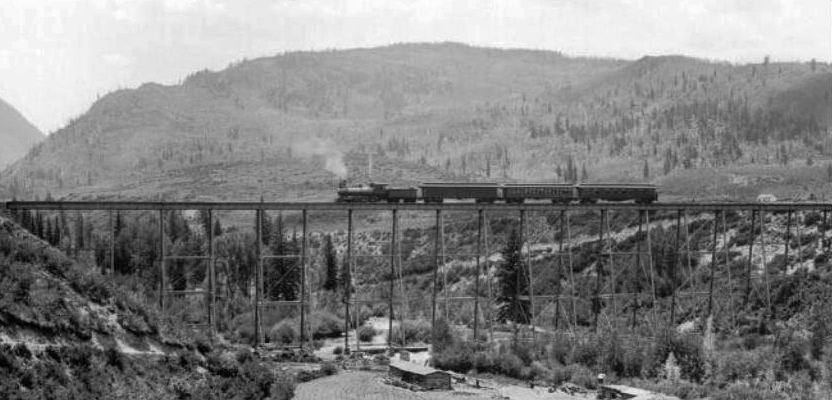
A train crossing the Maroon Creek Bridge around 1900

There was still enough mining to keep the railroads busy, but not for long. In 1897 the Midland went bankrupt. It continued operating, and a new company formed under the same name to take over. In 1919 Smuggler Mine, the city's largest and oldest, shut down most of its operations and several others closed. The second Midland again succumbed to bankruptcy; there was no second resurrection. Its tracks and right-of-way, including the bridges, were abandoned.

They soon reverted to state ownership. The Colorado Highway Commission used them to realize plans it had made a decade earlier, when it first designated the future Highway 82 through the Roaring Fork Valley. With the Midland's tracks unused, it now had a graded route that could easily be adapted for highway purposes.

=== 1927–1961: Conversion to highway ===
Before developing the route west of Aspen, the state turned its attention the other way. In 1927 it rebuilt the old stage road over Independence Pass to Twin Lakes and designated it part of Highway 82, closing it in winters to avoid the maintenance costs. Most of it followed the original route; however in some places it deviated. The largest section of the original remains three miles (4.8 km) below the pass on the east approach. The foundation of the gatekeeper's house remains, as well as some of the original toll gate.

During the Depression, the state sought to ease unemployment through public works projects as an economic stimulus. It applied this to the new Highway 82. First it converted the Maroon Creek Bridge for automotive traffic by widening it with a timber deck, which was then paved and supported with outriggers. In 1937, four miles (6.4 km) between Glenwood Springs and Carbondale was paved; the remainder of the road to Aspen was oiled the following year.

It had been the hope that the improvements in the valley's road transportation would benefit the remaining mines. While the ranchers were able to get their products to market faster, the new road would catalyze Aspen's economic revival in an industry that had not existed when the Depression began: recreational downhill skiing. As Highway 82 was being improved, skiing enthusiasts from both the U.S. and Central Europe were cutting trails and building a primitive ski lift on the mountain south of town. The 1940 census recorded an increase in Aspen's population, the first in a half-century.

Further development was halted during the war years afterward, although the Tenth Mountain Division, which trained at nearby Camp Hale, came to appreciate Aspen and its skiing. Many of them came back to Aspen after the war, helping to expand and staff the ski resort. Coincidentally, Walter Paepcke, head of the Container Corporation of America, visited Aspen with his wife Elizabeth in the late 1940s, and found it an ideal place to establish a music festival they were planning. He invested heavily in the city's redevelopment, and people began coming to Aspen again to live, work and play. While the Rio Grande's trains still ran, many new visitors and arrivals preferred to drive.

=== 1962–2000: Expansion ===
By 1960 the population of Pitkin County had increased by 44 percent, the second-fastest growth rate on the Western Slope. The Aspen Skiing Company built two additional resorts, Buttermilk and Snowmass, to the west, contributing to traffic on the highway. In 1962 the Colorado Department of Highways, began a 12-year project to expand Highway 82 to four lanes between Glenwood Springs and Carbondale. The Maroon Creek Bridge was widened in 1963 to handle its increased traffic.

On the east, the road over Independence Pass was paved in 1967. The Rio Grande discontinued passenger train service to Aspen in 1969. It was soon replaced the next year, when the completion of Interstate 70 through Glenwood Canyon connected the western terminus of Highway 82 to the larger Interstate Highway System.

In the 1980s, it became apparent that four lanes at the western end was not enough. Several safety improvement areas were identified and projects implemented.

In 1988, the Basalt bypass opened and Route 82 was realigned. The old alignment between the eastern and western borders of the town became Colorado State Highway 82 Business (SH 82 Bus.).

At the end of the decade, the Independence Pass Foundation (IPF) was formally incorporated in Aspen. Its founder, environmental activist Bob Lewis, had been organizing efforts to revegetate the slopes alongside Highway 82 going up to the pass, in order to repair damage that had been done the road's construction. In cooperation with the Highway Department, the U.S. Forest Service and the county, the IPF rebuilt a curve along the road near the Weller Lake trailhead that year.

Safety improvements continued in the 1990s. A five-mile (8 km) stretch just west of Aspen was resurfaced in 1991. A special skid-resistant treatment was added to the areas that receive no sun in the winter due to shade from Shale Bluffs. The next year, in 1992, three two-year projects began expanding Highway 82 to four lanes between Carbondale and Basalt, including the new bypass. An old truss bridge near Wingo Junction was replaced in 1995; it was followed over the remainder of the decade by widening most of the remaining sections between Basalt and Aspen. At the Maroon Creek Bridge outside Aspen, a pedestrian bridge was built to the north to take foot traffic off the older bridge in an effort to relieve congestion.

The high-occupancy vehicle (HOV) lanes were designated in 1998. When they opened, they were the first anywhere in a rural area of Colorado. In a departure from the usual practice, the diamonds were painted in the right lanes rather than the left, so that Roaring Fork Transportation Authority (RFTA) buses could get to and from their stops more easily.

East of Aspen, the IPF began holding its annual Ride for the Pass bicycle race fundraiser in 1994. The race has been held almost every year since on the weekend before CDOT opens the pass. It follows a 9.5-mile (15.3 km) course from the gate to Independence. Two years after the first one the IPF began the project Lewis had always envisioned for it—restoring the Top Cut, the 1.5-mile (2.4 km) section just below the pass on the east, where the environmental damage, especially erosion, had always been most evident.

=== 2000–present: New Bridges ===
In the new century CDOT began the projects that would complete the four-lane expansion. It took one year to finish the expansion from Aspen Airport Business Center to Buttermilk. Three years later, in 2004, the section in Snowmass Canyon was expanded to four lanes at a cost of $100 million.

Highway 82 was now a four-lane road all the way from Glenwood Springs to Aspen. But that traffic still had to narrow to two lanes to cross the Maroon Creek Bridge at the latter city's western boundary. The old bridge, listed on the National Register of Historic Places since 1985, was functionally obsolete and structurally deficient. Cracks and other damage were forcing temporary closures of the bridge to trucks. Over 100 years old by that point, the oldest bridge in use on a Colorado highway, it could not be expanded any further.

A 1990 CDOT design proposal for a new bridge was dropped after heavy opposition. In 2004 the city of Aspen and the town of Snowmass jointly funded design work for another new bridge. CDOT expedited the planning process for the bridge and work began the next year. Construction of the segmental concrete box-girder replacement was complicated by the need to protect the wetlands below, a problem that was solved by building the bridge from the top down and taking measures to allow the concrete piers to be poured and dried during winter.

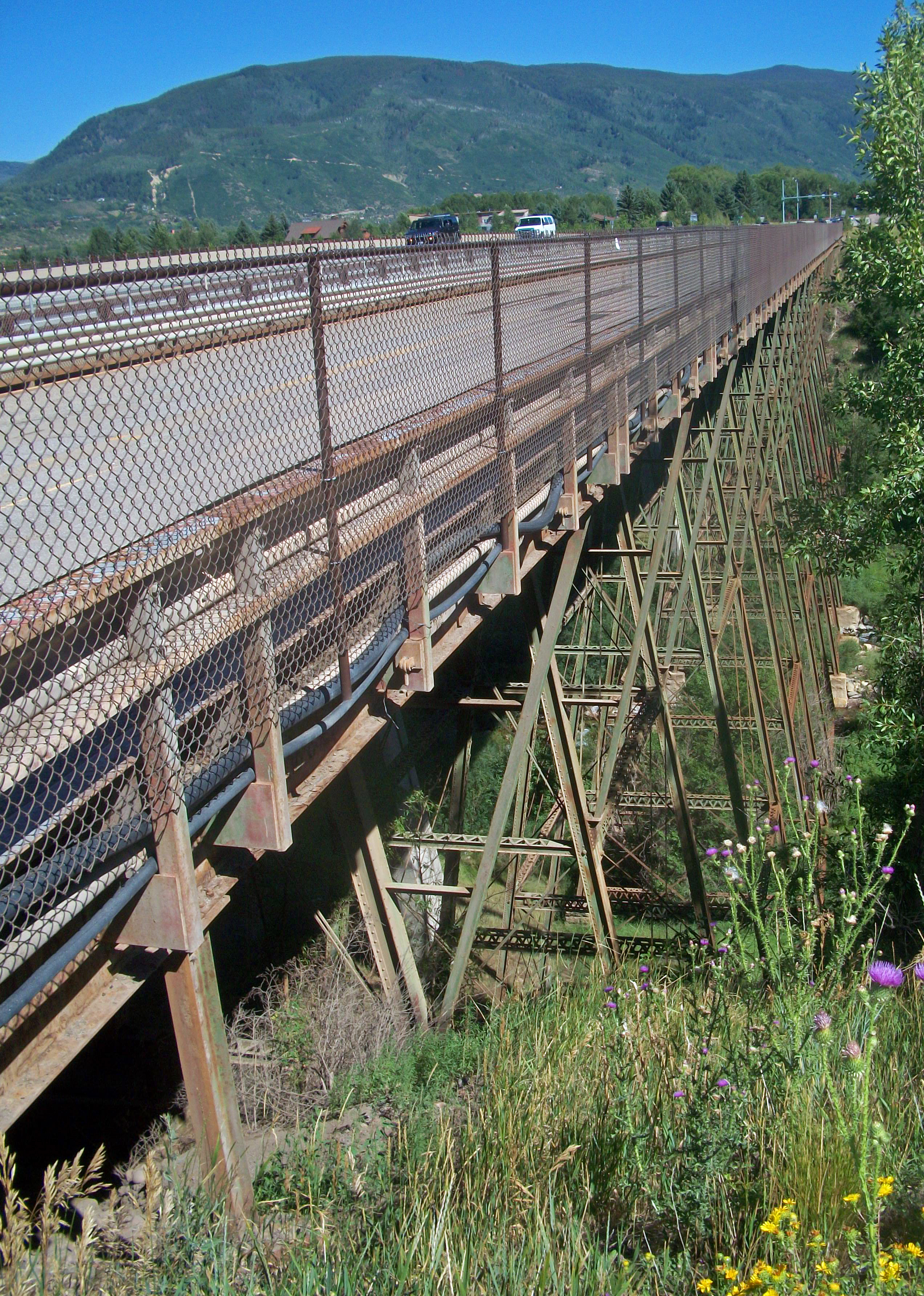
The old Maroon Creek Bridge in 2010

The new bridge cost $14 million and was opened in the middle of 2008. The old bridge remains in place next to it as a pedestrian walkway and historic landmark. The National Segmental Bridge Institute recognized CDOT and the new bridge with a Bridge Award for Excellence in 2010.

Sometime around 2006, the business route in Basalt was decommissioned and handed over to local control.

The former Grand Avenue Bridge over the Colorado River and I-70 was built in Glenwood Springs as a two-lane bridge with shoulders in 1953. Since then, the shoulders were changed into additional lanes in both directions. By the 2000s, it was carrying more traffic than it did in the past and was also in poor condition just like the Maroon Creek Bridge.

In the 2000s, CDOT began considering plans for a replacement of the Grand Avenue bridge. The major issue was whether a new bridge should be built along the same alignment as the then existing bridge, or instead, curve westward to make a more direct connection to Exit 116. After a public hearing in August 2012, the agency announced that the latter seemed to be overwhelmingly preferred. It remained to decide whether to have a signalized intersection or a roundabout at the intersection of Sixth Street and Laurel Avenue. Eventually, a mix of both options were chosen.

Some residents of Glenwood Springs have argued instead that CDOT should instead build a bypass that avoids downtown completely, as it did in Basalt. They contend that a replacement bridge would add even more traffic to Grand and make downtown less attractive to those who would like to shop there rather than just pass through on the way to destinations up the valley. The bypass, they claim, is more in keeping with the wishes of residents and would cost less. They have lobbied Glenwood Springs' city council to be more active in pressuring CDOT to reconsider the bypass.

The Grand Avenue Bridge functionally opened to the public November 6, 2017. It was the largest construction project completed on the Western Slope of Colorado in the past 25 years.

== Future ==
With the widening of the highway to four lanes between Glenwood Springs and Aspen complete, CDOT has turned its attention to the ends of that corridor.

=== Entrance to Aspen ===
By the 21st century, Highway 82 had grown to four lanes. It was easier for traffic to get to Aspen but did not resolve the congestion that developed when it got there. Since the 1970s various plans to alleviate the congestion had been put forth, some involving ballot initiatives decided by the voters of the city and/or county. In 1998 CDOT and the Federal Highway Administration (FHWA), after considering all the proposals and taking public input, released a Record of Decision. The preferred alternative combined highway and intersection improvements, mass transit and incremental transportation management.

Some of the recommended improvements, such as the roundabout, replacement Maroon Creek Bridge, and improvements to the intersections along Highway 82 between the city and the airport, have been implemented. Right-of-way easements have been acquired for a new two-lane parkway, as authorized by voters, that would cross the Holden/Marolt property via a 400-foot (120 m) cut and cover tunnel to reconnect to the existing highway at Main and Seventh streets. City voters also authorized light rail for that route.

If built, the light rail would have as its western terminus a maintenance facility across Highway 82 from the airport. It would include a stop at Buttermilk and parallel the highway, using the old Maroon Creek Bridge, until it reached Monarch Street downtown. There it would turn south to its eastern terminus at Rubey Park. If there is not sufficient support or funding for the light rail, it could be built as bus lanes at first.

Proposed transportation management strategies are aimed at keeping traffic into Aspen at the baseline 1993 level through 2015. There are three levels or strategic response: The first would be when that baseline is equaled or slightly exceeded. It would consist of promoting carpooling and more extensive transit use, among other informational measures. At Level 2, when traffic reaches a few percentage points above that level, more transit service would be added, and parking rates raised slightly to fund the additional buses required to reduce headways. Level 3 would be implemented when traffic levels had exceeded the baseline by 5–10%, and would use more forceful measures such as steeper increases in parking fees, deliberately limiting the number of spaces available, and making some parts of downtown Aspen car-free zones.

== Major intersections ==
| County | Location | mi | km | Destinations | Notes |
|---|---|---|---|---|---|
| Garfield | Glenwood Springs | 0.000 | 0.000 | I-70 (US 6) – Denver, Grand Junction | Diamond interchange; western terminus; I-70 exit 116 |
| Garfield | Glenwood Springs | 0.029 | 0.047 | Hot Springs Historic District | Interchange; eastbound exit and entrance only |
| Garfield | | 11.699 | 18.828 | SH 133 south – Carbondale, Redstone | Northern terminus of SH 133 |
| Eagle | No major junctions | | | | |
| Pitkin | | 47.0 | 75.6 | Overlength vehicle turn around | |
Stretch of road closed October–May
| Lake | | 71.5 | 115.1 | South Fork Lake Creek Road | |
| Lake | | 85.293 | 137.266 | US 24 to I-70 – Leadville, Buena Vista | Eastern terminus |
1.000 mi = 1.609 km; 1.000 km = 0.621 mi: Incomplete access
