= Independence, Pitkin County, Colorado =

Ghost town in Colorado, United States

- Independence and Independence Mill Site
- U.S. National Register of Historic Places
- U.S. Historic district
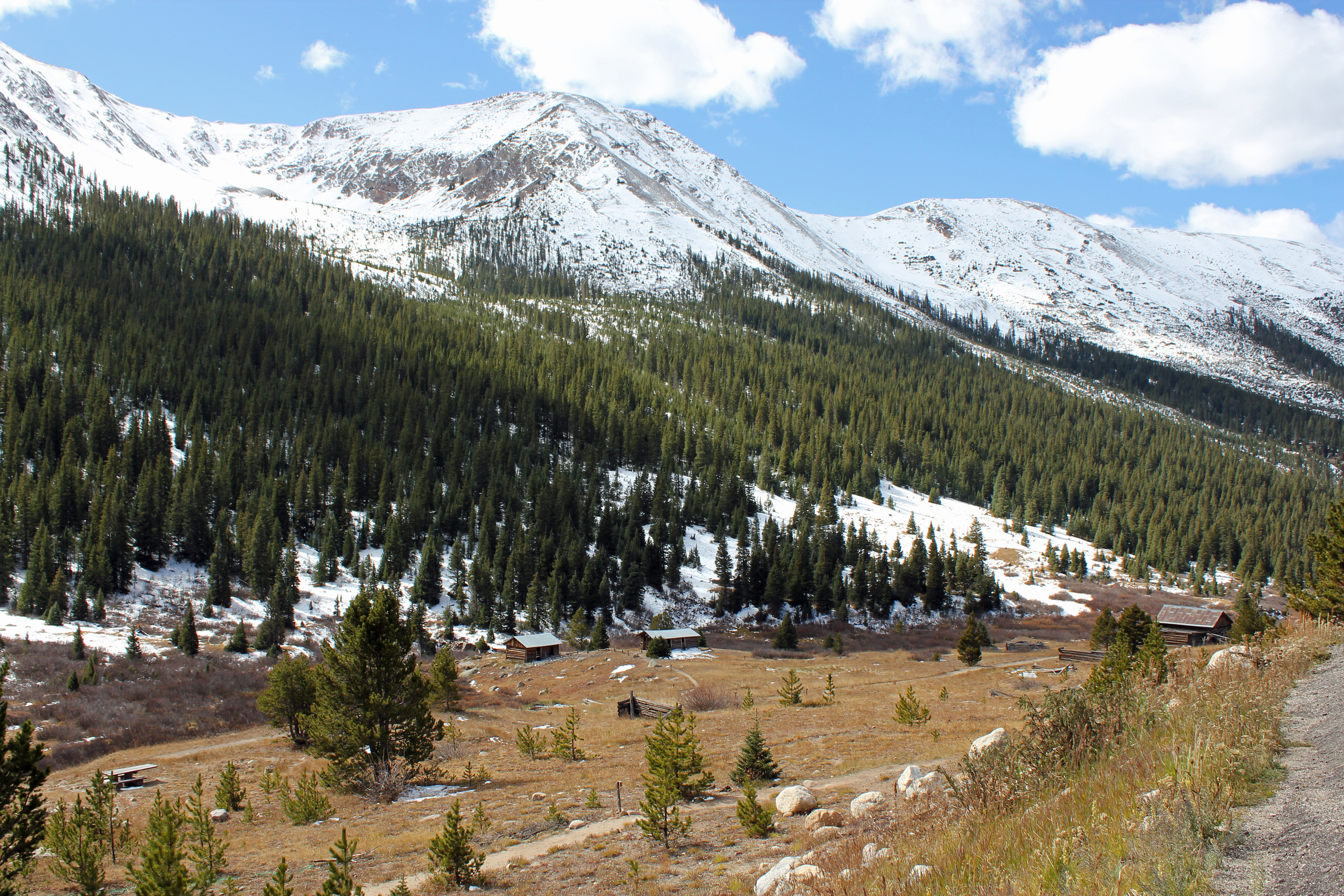
- Independence and nearby mountains from SH 82, 2011

- Location within Colorado Location within the United States
- Location: White River National Forest, CO
- Nearest city: Aspen
- Coordinates: 39.1072°N 106.6059°W
- Area: 40 acres (16 ha)
- Built: 1880s
- MPS: Mining Industry in Colorado
- NRHP reference No.: 73000484
- Added to NRHP: April 11, 1973

Independence is an extinct town located in Pitkin County, Colorado, United States. It is located at an elevation of 10,913 feet (3,326 m) 2.2 miles (3.6 km) directly west of Independence Pass. It was the first settlement established in the Roaring Fork Valley, after gold was struck in the vicinity on Independence Day, July 4, 1879, hence its name. It has also been known historically as Mammoth City, Mount Hope, and Hunter's Pass.

In 1973, it was recognized as a historic district and listed on the National Register of Historic Places as Independence and Independence Mill Site.

Like other early settlements in the upper Roaring Fork Valley, it lost population over the course of the decade as Aspen emerged as the ideal location for commerce in the region, and then became the county seat. It was never able to overcome the severe winters that resulted from its location at a high elevation in the mountains, and at the end of the 19th century all but one of the remaining residents abandoned Independence en masse after a particularly heavy snowstorm to settle in Aspen.

It has been a ghost town since at least 1912. The remaining structures, all log cabins of various sizes, are now on land partially in White River National Forest. It is one of the few abandoned mining camps in the state where any buildings are left. In the late 20th century they were restored and interpretive materials added.

== Geography ==
Independence is located 13.5 miles (21.7 km) east of Aspen along Colorado State Highway 82, at an elevation of 10,913 feet (3,326 m) in the narrow, steep valley of the headwaters of the Roaring Fork River, a tributary of the Colorado River. Highway 82 passes by the townsite on the north wall of the valley. Independence Pass, at the Continental Divide, is four miles (6.4 km) to the east along the highway. The land is open and cleared, with some wooded portions on the comparatively level ground next to the river.

The land on the upper part of the slope is owned by the United States Forest Service, and is in the White River National Forest. The valley walls rise steeply to 12,703-foot (3,872 m) Independence Mountain to the south in the Collegiate Peaks Wilderness and 13,301-foot (4,054 m) Geissler Mountain in the Hunter–Fryingpan Wilderness to the north. The portion of Independence closer to the river is on private land owned by the Loughren Trust.

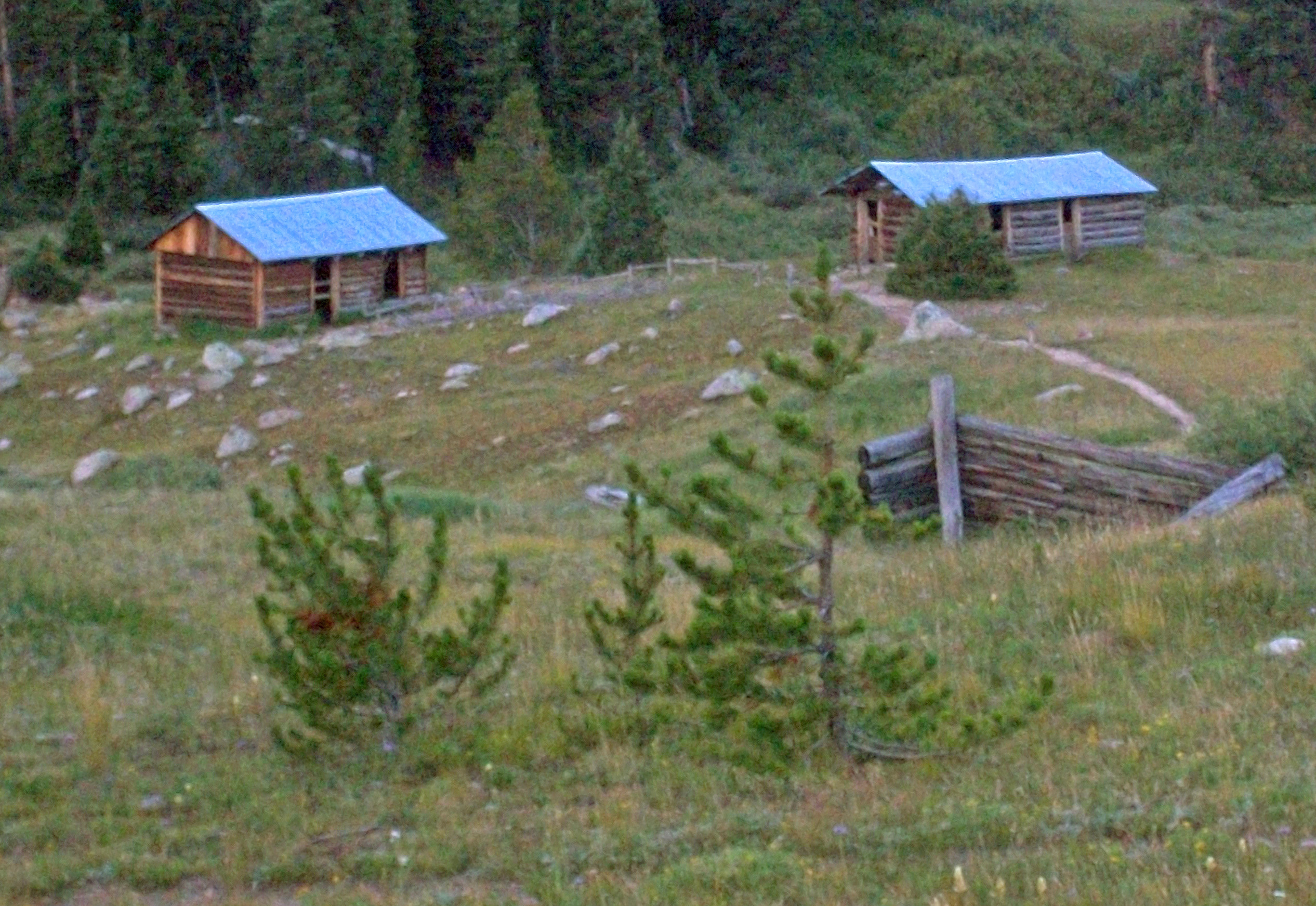
Some of the remaining log cabins

The remaining buildings are located in a 40-acre (16 ha) area along the north slope down to the river, on land owned by the Loughren Trust. A total of 26 remain in some form; of those, eight are intact and standing. All are log cabins of varying sizes, some without roofs. The rest have just left foundations.

The two are grouped roughly around two areas: the former townsite, and the former mill, roughly 0.3 miles (480 m) apart. The townsite is an area of 17 acres (6.9 ha) with 19 buildings and 9 foundations; the mill has the remaining nine in a 4.3-acre (1.7 ha) area. A network of dirt paths allows visitors to walk around the site.

One cabin, towards the west end of the site, has been fully restored into a modern residence. It is called the Intern Cabin, since it housed one who lived at the site during the summers to maintain it and offer interpretive tours to visitors. Another large surviving cabin is believed to have served as one of the settlement's general stores. Further west, just below Highway 82, is the large site of the former Farwell Mill, with some supporting timbers still visible.

== History ==
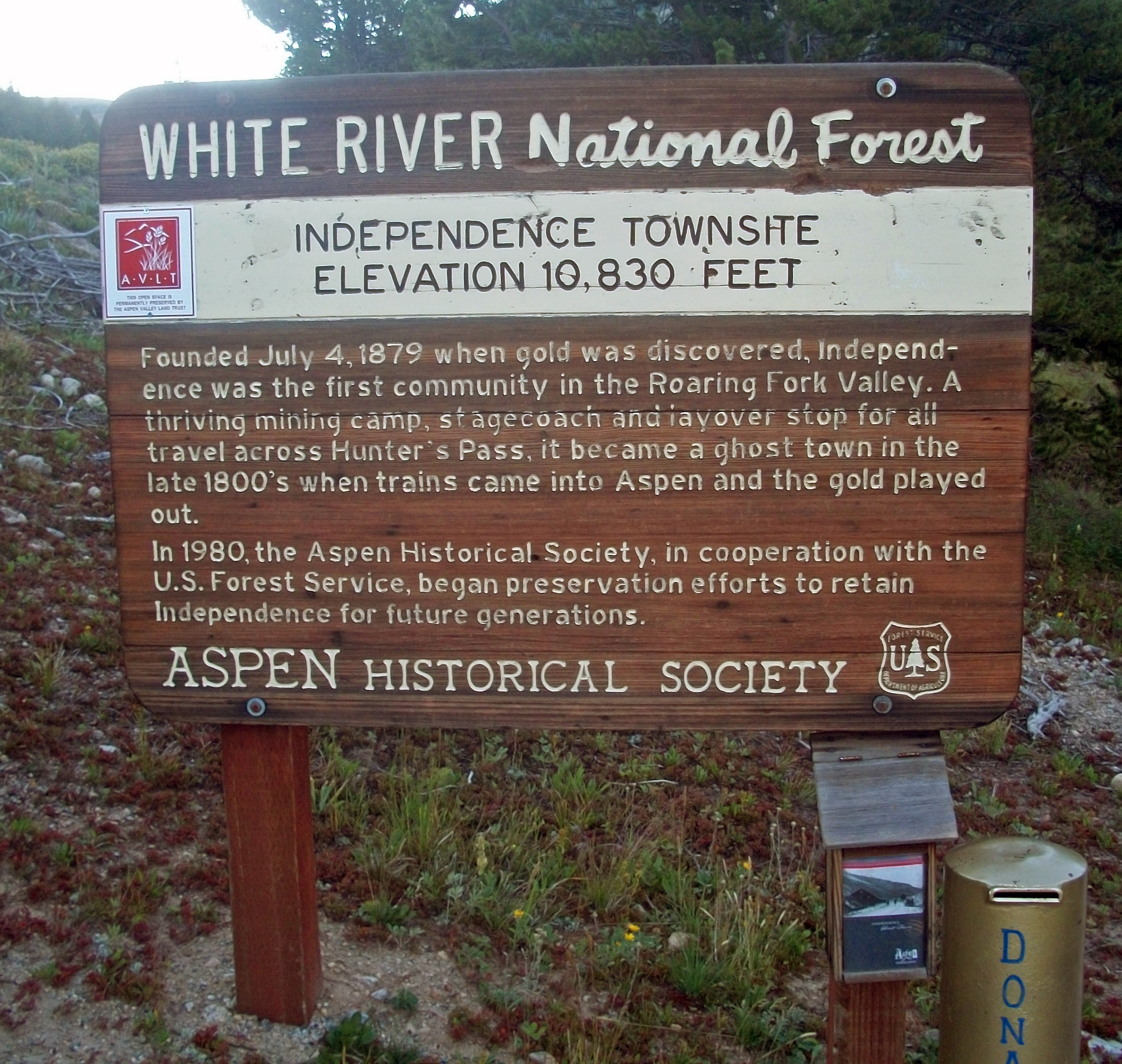
U.S. Forest Service plaque at site

In 1879 prospectors began heading west from Leadville over the Divide and into the Roaring Fork Valley, drawn by reports of vast mineral deposits there. On July 4 of that year, miners at a small camp just below the Divide struck gold. They named it the Independence claim after the holiday, and soon a small tent city developed on the site. Reports reached Leadville, where some earlier prospectors had retreated following hostility from the Ute Native American tribe that had led Colorado governor Frederick Pitkin to issue an order barring any European settlers from crossing the Divide. Despite that edict, more settlers came to the growing community, the first European settlement in the valley. The miners worked out a primitive government called a mining district to protect not only their claims but those of others who had retreated to Leadville.

By the next year Independence had reached a population of 150, with some permanent buildings beginning to replace the original tents. Two other camps had been established further down the valley—Ute City just above the junction of the Roaring Fork and Castle Creek, and Ashcroft (originally Chloride), 10 miles (16 km) up Castle Creek from the junction. In 1881 a group of investors from Leadville called the Farwell Consolidated Mining Company bought up all the mining claims around the settlement, and established a stamping mill and sawmill. A stage road, the predecessor of Highway 82, was built from Leadville over the Divide. With the trip from that city to the other mining towns further down the valley taking 2–5 days, Independence also did business as an overnight stage stop. (Note: Independence was served by three differently named post offices: Farwell from July 14, 1881, until July 3, 1882; Sparkill from February 1, 1882, until October 18, 1887; and Chipeta from April 20, 1899, until October 17, 1899.)

Two years after the first gold was struck, Independence was a prosperous mining town of 500. It had seven restaurants, 24 retail establishments, three saloons and the Miner, a local newspaper. Over the next two years Farwell's mines produced $190,000 ($5.31 million in 2024) worth of gold.

Despite this economic supremacy, Independence lost its bid to be the seat of the newly created Pitkin County to the last of the original mining settlements in the valley, Ute City, now renamed Aspen after the abundance of that tree in the area. Independence's growth continued apace. In 1882 it had 1,500 residents, 47 businesses, five saloons, and two boarding houses.

That year would prove to be the peak of Independence's boom times. Gold production dropped to just $2,000 ($57,000 in 2024) in 1883 as most of the early veins were worked out. Miners and other residents began leaving Independence for Aspen. The county seat had more economic opportunities, since several mining companies supported by wealthy Eastern investors were in town and its mines produced silver, which the federal government was required to buy under the Sherman Silver Purchase Act to support the dollar. Aspen also had a milder climate—at Independence's high elevation, the town was under heavy snow cover from late October to mid-May every year. (Today, Highway 82 is closed during that time period, rendering Independence inaccessible by automobile for those months.)

By 1888 the town's population had declined to 150. Later that year the first railroads reached Aspen, greatly reducing the stage traffic over the Divide, another pillar of the local economy. Five years later, the end of Aspen's boom, with the Sherman Act's repeal in response to the Panic of 1893, made it even more difficult for Independence to endure. Finally, in winter of 1899, seven severe snowstorms cut the town off from the outside world for long periods of time. Residents ran out of food and other supplies, and when another storm hit, one of the worst in the state's history, all but one decided to evacuate. Tearing the 10–12 feet (3.0–3.7 m) siding planks off their houses, they used them as cross-country skis for the trip down the valley to Aspen. They humorously billed their escape as the "Hunter Pass Tenderfoot Snowshoe Club Race", with an entry fee of one ham sandwich each.

They never returned to Independence. Despite a brief resurgence in prospecting in 1907–08, by 1912 the village was completely abandoned. That year the Farwell Stamp Mill caught fire. Most of what remained was taken for use as building materials elsewhere. It and the other buildings were left to deteriorate, although some of the mining claims remained active at least up to the time of its listing on the National Register.

In its heavy winters, the site was still vulnerable to avalanches, particularly down the south side of the valley, which had been deforested to open up mines. In the 1930s the Colorado Women's Club organized a program which used Civilian Conservation Corps labor to replant the slopes and end the avalanche danger. It was the first preservation effort at Independence. Later in the century, after its listing on the Register, the Aspen Historical Society and other groups worked with the U.S. Forest Service to restore the log cabins, build the path network, add interpretive plaques and pay for an intern to live there during the summer months.

== See also ==
- List of ghost towns in Colorado
