= Sheely Bridge =

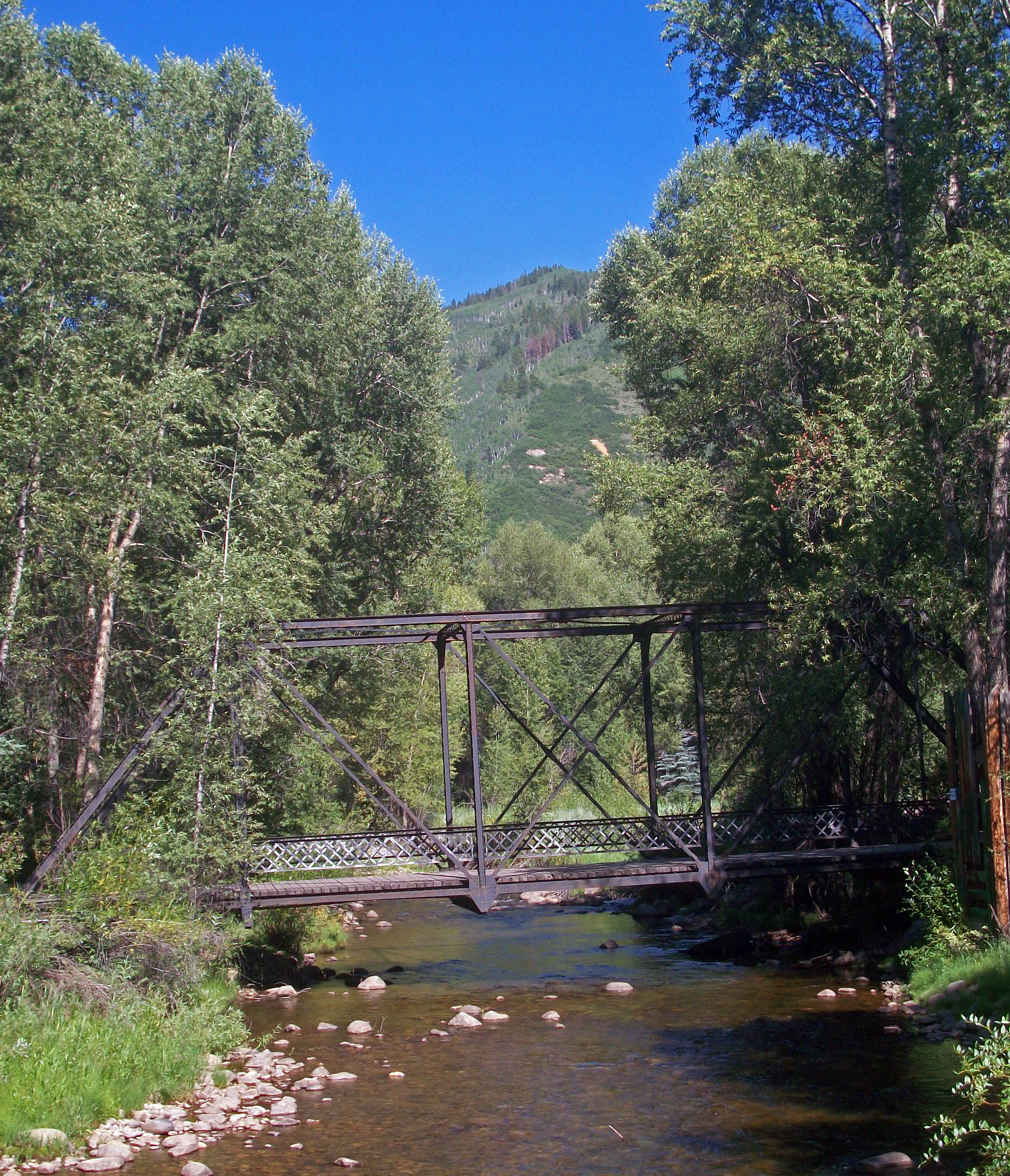
- Bridge in 2010
- Coordinates: 39°11′35″N 106°49′1″W
- Carries: Pedestrians
- Crosses: Roaring Fork River
- Locale: Aspen, CO, USA
- Owner: City of Aspen
- Heritage status: NRHP #85000223

Characteristics
- Design: Pratt through truss
- Material: Steel, concrete, wood
- Total length: 87 feet (27 m)
- Width: 15 feet 3 inches (4.65 m)
- Height: 20 feet 6 inches (6.25 m)
- Longest span: 85 feet (26 m)
- No. of spans: 1
- Clearance above: 17 feet (5.2 m)

History
- Designer: Charles Sheely
- Constructed by: Charles G. Sheely
- Construction end: 1911
- Construction cost: $6,300
- Opened: 1911

The Sheely Bridge, originally known as the Carbondale Bridge, carries pedestrian traffic across the Roaring Fork River at Mill Street Park in Aspen, Colorado, United States. It is a short steel truss bridge originally located downstream in Carbondale and later moved to its present location.

It takes its current name from designer and builder Charles Sheely. When built as a highway bridge in the early 20th century it was one of the first in the state to use rivets. It served its original purpose until the 1960s. In 1985 it was listed on the National Register of Historic Places and is one of two bridges in Aspen with that distinction, along with the Maroon Creek Bridge at the city's west end.

== Structure ==
The bridge is located on Mill Street Park north of downtown Aspen, 200 feet (61 m) east of the intersection of North Mill and Puppy Smith streets. It is roughly in the center of the park, crossing the Roaring Fork between an open field and ponds to the south and a wooded area to the north between the bend in the river downstream and Gibson Avenue. On the west side of North Mill is a shopping plaza; north of Gibson is a residential area.

Structurally, it is a five-panel steel Pratt through truss. It has a two-channel top chord with a cover plate and lacing; on the bottom chord are four angles with continuous plate. They are connected by verticals and diagonals of consisting of two angles and spacers each; the verticals further have two channels with lacing. Concrete wingwalls throughout provide substructure. The timber deck is supported by steel stringers and cross beams. There is latticework on both sides under the guardrail.

== History ==
Designer Charles Sheely, founder of the Charles G. Sheely Construction Company, was one of the three major in-state bridge designers and builders of late 19th- and early 20th-century Colorado. His best-known works are the Rifle Bridge and Rainbow Arch Bridge, the last of which was the longest Marsh arch bridge in the world at the time of its construction.

What is now known as the Sheely Bridge was originally built to carry State Highway 133 across the Roaring Fork River at Carbondale in 1911, replacing an 1890s bridge that had deteriorated to the point that it could no longer be used or repaired. It was one of the first riveted truss bridges built in the state, at a cost of $6,300 ($213,000 in modern dollars). At the time it was 120 feet (37 m) long.

After 55 years it was replaced in turn by a more modern bridge and moved to its current location in Aspen. There it was shortened by removing two panels, to its current 87-foot (27 m) length. It is one of the few Sheely bridges in the state today, and the earliest riveted truss bridge remaining.

== See also ==
- List of bridges on the National Register of Historic Places in Colorado
- National Register of Historic Places in Pitkin County, Colorado
