= Maroon Creek =

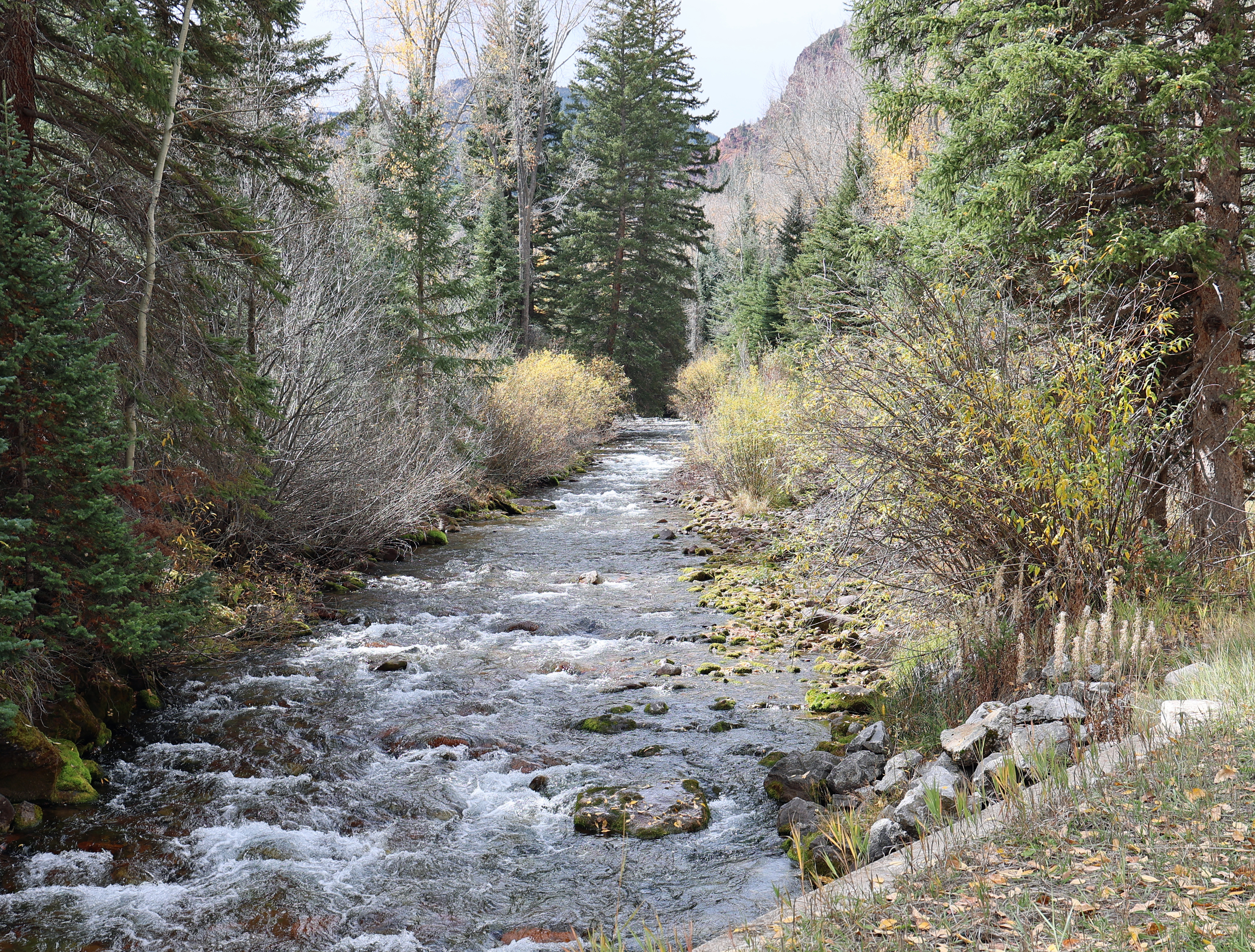
- Maroon Creek (2025)

- The location of the creek's mouth in Colorado

Physical characteristics
- Source
  - location: White River National Forest
  - coordinates: 39°6′25.96″N 106°54′53.15″W
- Mouth
  - location: near Aspen, Colorado
  - coordinates: 39°12′52.95″N 106°51′0.14″W
  - elevation: 7,638 feet (2,328 meters)
- Length: 9.4 miles (15.1 kilometers).

Basin features
- Progression: Roaring Fork → Colorado
- Tributaries
  - left: West Maroon Creek; Willow Creek
  - right: East Maroon Creek
- Bridges: Maroon Creek Bridge

Maroon Creek is a tributary of the Roaring Fork River in Pitkin County, Colorado. The Maroon Creek Bridge in Aspen takes its name from the creek, which passes under the bridge. The creek joins the Roaring Fork River just outside the Aspen city limits.

== Course ==
The creek rises at the confluence of West Maroon Creek and East Maroon Creek southwest of Aspen in the White River National Forest. From here, the creek flows northeast alongside Maroon Creek Road. The creek passes through a diversion dam just outside the Aspen city limits. After entering Aspen, the creek turns north and separates from Maroon Creek Road. The creek then passes under Maroon Creek Bridge, turns towards the north, and joins the Roaring Fork River just outside the Aspen City Limits near Slaughterhouse Falls.

=== Dam ===
The city of Aspen owns and runs a diversion dam along the creek located in Maroon Creek Valley south of Aspen Highlands Village. The dam has a small reservoir, and two penstocks convey water to two facilities downstream. One facility is a small hydroelectric plant located about 6,900 feet (2,100 meters) downstream. The hydroelectric powerplant there produces electricity for the city's power utility and returns the water to the creek. The other facility is Aspen's water treatment plant. Maroon Creek is the chief supply of potable water for the municipal water system.

=== Bridge ===
The Maroon Creek Bridge was originally built as a train trestle in 1888. In the 1920s, it was converted to a highway bridge and was used for automobile traffic until a new highway bridge was completed in 2008. The new bridge was built alongside the original bridge, which now functions as a pedestrian bridge. Maroon Creek flows under both bridges. The 1888 bridge is listed on the National Register of Historic Places.

== See also ==
- List of rivers of Colorado
