= Castle Creek (Roaring Fork River tributary) =

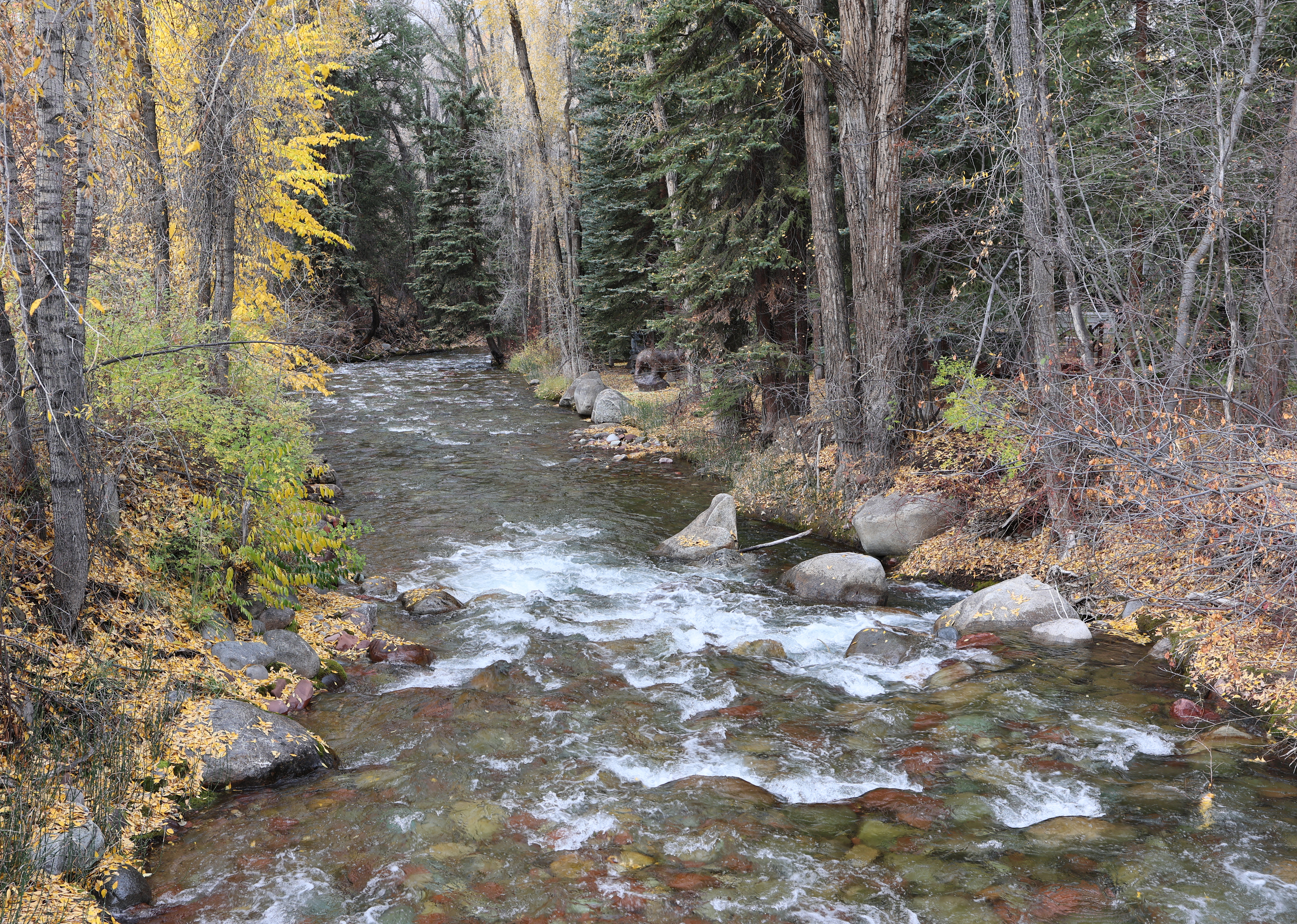
- The creek at Power Plant Road in Aspen (2025)

- The location of the creek's mouth in Colorado

Physical characteristics
- Source
  - location: Near Castle Peak
  - coordinates: 39°0′23.97″N 106°51′7.14″W
- Mouth
  - location: Aspen, Colorado
  - coordinates: 39°12′47.95″N 106°49′59.14″W
  - elevation: 8,143 feet (2,482 meters)
- Length: 15 miles (24 kilometers).
- Basin size: 76 square miles (200 square kilometers)

Basin features
- Progression: Roaring Fork → Colorado
- Tributaries
  - left: Pine Creek; Devaney Creek; Sandy Creek; Sawyer Creek; Conundrum Creek
  - right: Copper Creek; Express Creek; Fall Creek

Castle Creek is a tributary of the Roaring Fork River in Pitkin County, Colorado. The Castle Creek Bridge in Aspen takes its name from the creek, which passes under the bridge. The creek joins the Roaring Fork River nearby in Aspen.

== Course ==
The creek rises near Castle Peak south of Aspen in the White River National Forest. From there, it travels generally north, flowing along Castle Creek Road and through the ghost town of Ashcroft. Approaching Aspen, the creek flows past the Aspen Music School The creek then goes through the Marolt Open Space. Next it passes under the Castle Creek Bridge in Aspen, which carries Colorado State Highway 82 at the entrance to Aspen. It then enters Aspen's Meadowlands Open Space, passing by the Aspen Power Plant and then under a bridge on Power Plant Road. It then continues north a bit to its confluence with the Roaring Fork River.

== See also ==
- List of rivers of Colorado
