= Roaring Fork River =

Tributary

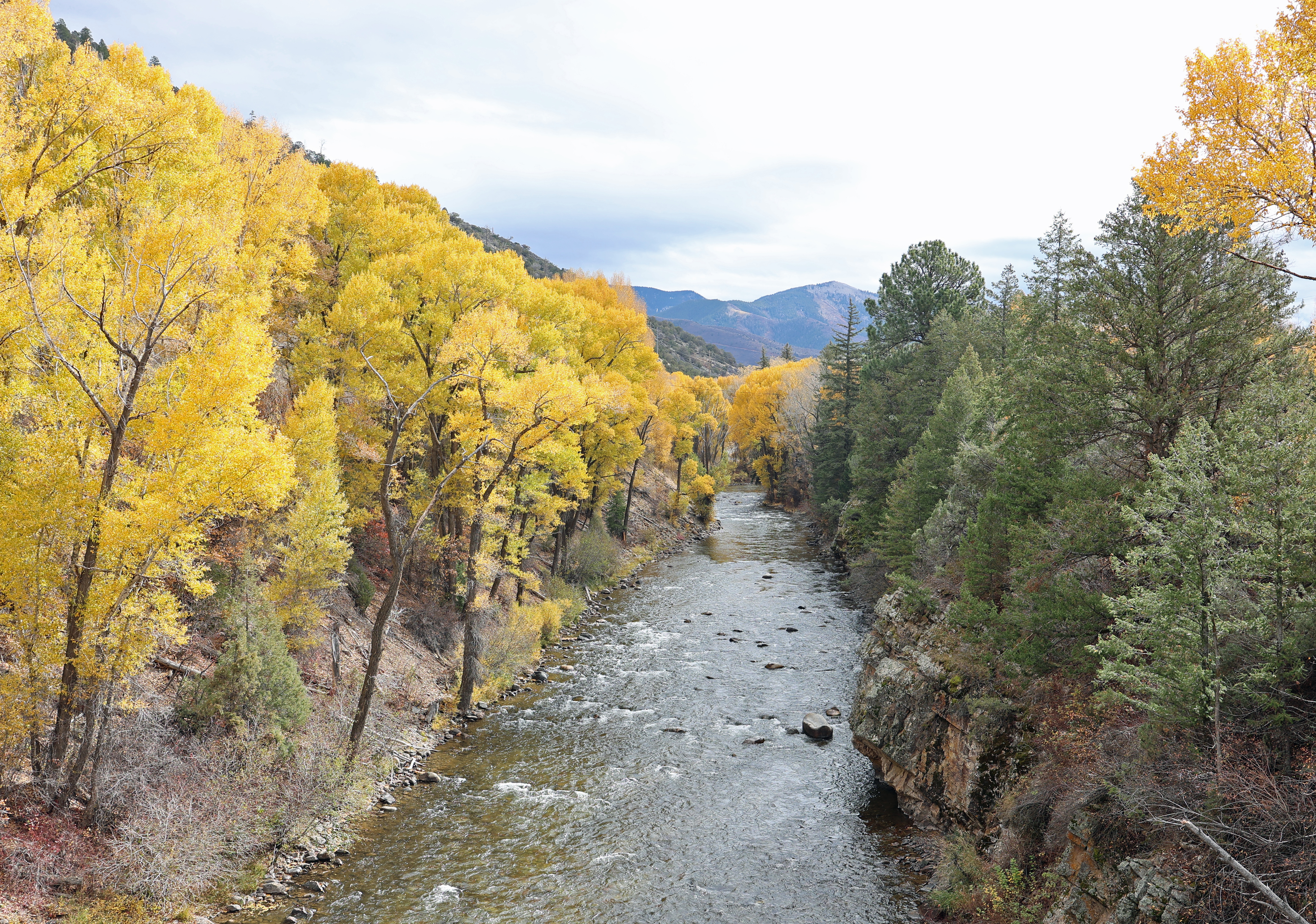
- Looking upstream from a bridge in Pitkin County (2025)

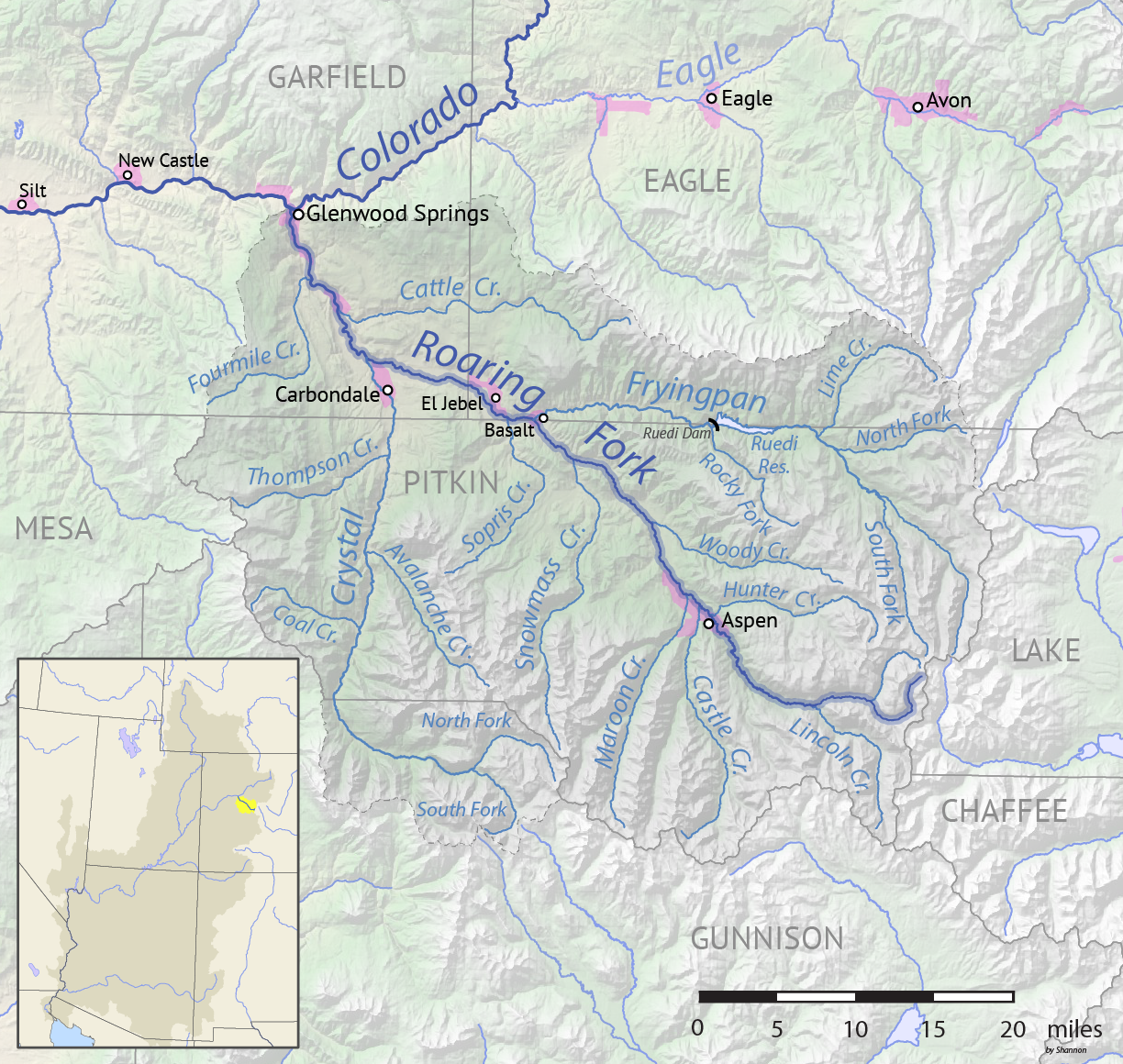
- Map of the Roaring Fork River

Location
- Country: United States
- State: Colorado

Physical characteristics
- Source: Independence Lake
  - location: White River National Forest, Pitkin County
  - coordinates: 39°08′38″N 106°34′04″W
  - elevation: 12,490 ft (3,810 m)
- Mouth: Colorado River
  - location: Glenwood Springs, Garfield County
  - coordinates: 39°32′57″N 107°19′47″W
  - elevation: 5,718 ft (1,743 m)
- Length: 70 mi (110 km)
- Basin size: 1,453 sq mi (3,760 km^{2})
- Discharge
  - location: mouth
  - average: 1,206 cu ft/s (34.2 m^{3}/s)
  - minimum: 180 cu ft/s (5.1 m^{3}/s)
  - maximum: 13,000 cu ft/s (370 m^{3}/s)

Basin features
- Tributaries
  - left: Independence Creek; Lincoln Creek; Difficult Creek; McFarlane Creek; Castle Creek; Maroon Creek; Owl Creek; Brush Creek; Snowmass Creek; Sopris Creek; Crystal River; Fourmile Creek; Threemile Creek
  - right: Lost Man Creek; Coleman Creek; Ptarmigan Creek; Hunter Creek; Woody Creek; Fryingpan River; Crystal Spring Creek; Cattle Creek

The Roaring Fork River is a tributary of the Colorado River, approximately 70 miles (110 km) long, in west central Colorado in the United States. The river drains a populated and economically vital area of the Colorado Western Slope called the Roaring Fork Valley or Roaring Fork Watershed, which includes the resort city of Aspen and the resorts of Aspen/Snowmass.

== Course ==
The river rises in the Sawatch Range in eastern Pitkin County, on the west side of Independence Pass on the continental divide. It flows northwest past Aspen, Woody Creek, and Snowmass. It receives the Fryingpan River at Basalt, and, 1.5 miles (2 km) below Carbondale, it receives the Crystal River from the south. It joins the Colorado in Glenwood Springs. The entire area that drains into the Roaring Fork River is known as the Roaring Fork Watershed. This area is 1,451 square miles (3,760 km^{2}) and about the same size as the state of Rhode Island. The river flows through canyons along most of its route.

== Recreation ==
The river is popular among fishermen, rafters, and kayakers. There are several boat launches and other river access sites along its lower stretches, including one operated jointly by the Bureau of Land Management and Pitkin County Open Space called the Wingo Junction River Access, located between Basalt and Snowmass. It offers a concrete boat ramp and parking. The river is divided into its upper and lower sections at Carbondale, where the Crystal River has its confluence. The upper river is unnavigable until late May each year.

=== Rafting and kayaking ===
The Roaring Fork is a swift, deep, powerful river with very clear water. It is navigable by small craft throughout most of its length to its confluence with the Colorado. The mean annual flow is 1,206 cu ft/s (34.2 m^{3}/s).

The river is a popular destination for whitewater rafting. Many visitors choose to use the services of an outfitter for rafting and kayaking. Outfitters offer guided rafting trips down the river, which includes some Class I-III rapids. They also rent rafts and kayaks. Standup paddleboarding and tubing are also popular, especially later in the summer when the weather is warmer and the river clearer.

=== Fishing ===
The river offers public fishing sites along much of its course. Anglers fish for brown trout, cutthroat trout, rainbow trout, brook trout, and whitefish. Two sections of the river have earned the "gold medal" fishing designation.

== Transbasin diversion ==
Some of the water from the river and its tributaries is diverted and transported east across the continental divide. The Independence Pass Transmountain Diversion System conveys water from the river and several tributaries to Grizzly Reservoir and from there transfers it through a tunnel to North Fork Lake Creek, above Twin Lakes, Colorado. From there it is distributed to the cities of Aurora and Colorado Springs for municipal use and to farmers and ranchers along the Arkansas River east of Pueblo for irrigation.

== Conservation ==
The Roaring Fork Conservancy is the watershed conservation organization for the Roaring Fork River and its tributaries. Among its activities, the organization acquires and holds conservation easements along the river, which prevent development and help preserve the river's natural state.

== See also ==
- List of rivers of Colorado
- List of tributaries of the Colorado River
