= Mountain Fair =

Summer arts and music fair

Coordinates: 39.3993921°N 107.2137076°W

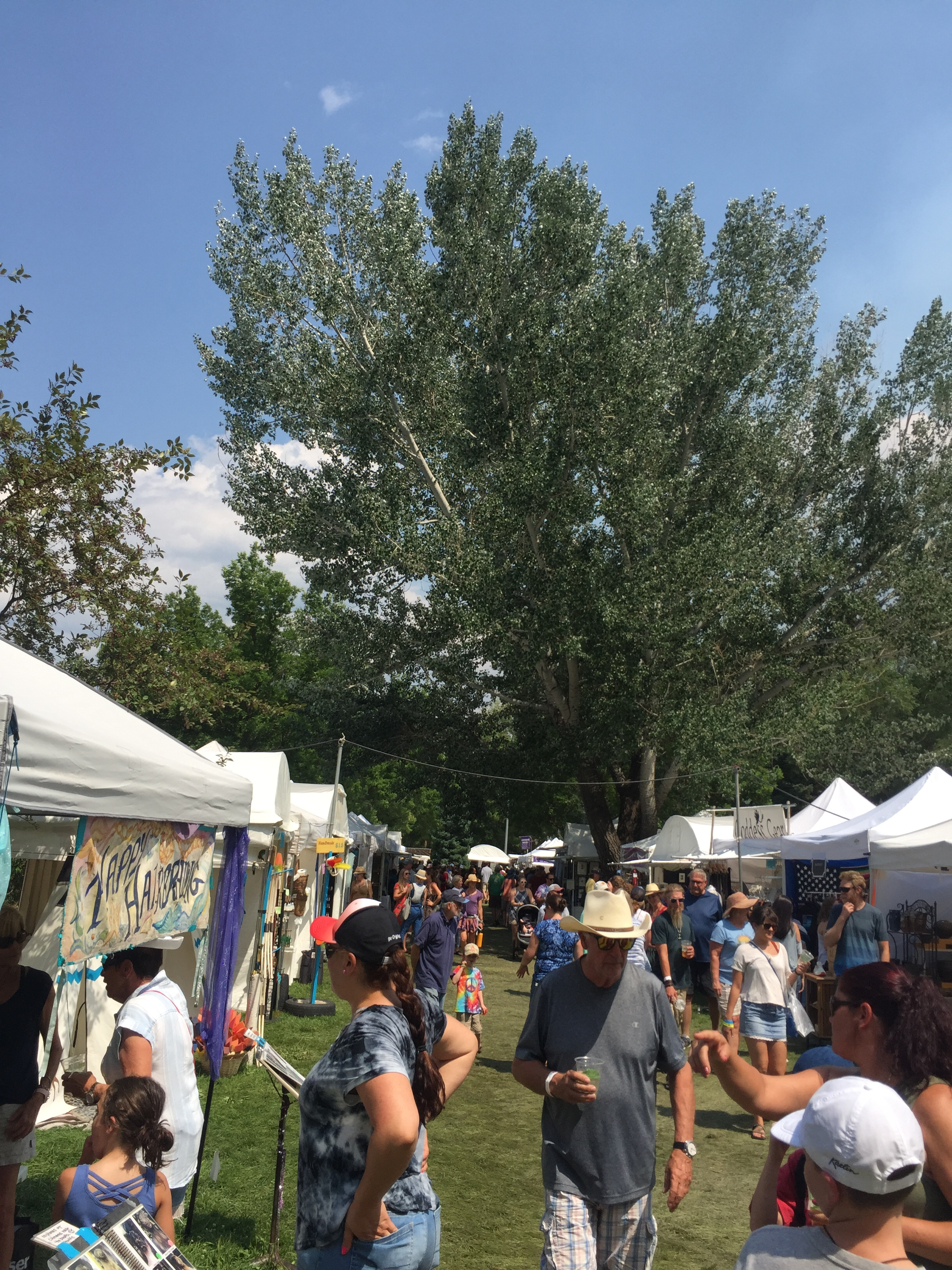
- Art Vendors at Mountain Fair in 2018
- Locations: Carbondale, Colorado
- Years active: 1972 - Present
- Most recent: 25 July 2025 - 27 July 2025
- Next event: 24 July 2026 - 27 July 2026
- Website: http://www.carbondalearts.com/mountain-fair/

Mountain Fair is a summer arts and music fair held annually in Sopris Park in Carbondale, Colorado. It has been held annually during the last weekend of July since 1972.

Each year between 15,000 and 20,000 people attend the event over the course of the three days that it is held.

== History ==
Mountain Fair was started by Laurie Loeb as part of Colorado's state Chautauqua in 1972. Booth displays included Native American weavings, local Boy Scouts sold seed and corn necklaces and Colorado Rocky Mountain School sold gyros. About 800 people attended the inaugural fair.

The events sponsoring organization, the Carbondale Council on Arts and Humanities (later changed to Carbondale Arts), was formed in 1974. A year later in 1975, competitions were added to Mountain Fair, starting with the wheelbarrow race. In 1976 the pie contest was added. The Mt. Sopris Runoff, Horseshoe toss and Limbo contest were added in 1979. "Woodspitting" (wood splitting) began the following year in 1980.

Former fair director Thomas Lawley, then the fairs longest time fair director, held the position for 16 years. Following his resignation as fair director in 2003, Ilene Pevec became the next director. However, Pevec resigned before the end of the year. The following year Amy Kimberly took over as fair director. She held the position for 18 years, until 2022, making her the fairs longest director to date. Current fair director Jamie Abbott took over as director that same year. She also became the executive director of Carbondale Arts, replacing Kimberly.

Over the years, the event has significantly grown in size and popularity.

Due to the COVID-19 pandemic a regular fair was not held in 2020. Instead, a revised event was held, where musical acts performed from a flatbed truck that drove through town. Additionally on the last day of the event, the local venue Steves Guitars hosted a virtual livestreamed concert.

== Events ==
Mountain Fair has many contests and competitions, such as the Wood Splitting Competition, Limbo Contest and Fly-Casting Competition which are held each year. There are also two contests for Pie and Cake Baking.

For many years the Dance of the Sacred Fire was held at night annually. In 2018 however, due to stage 2 fire restrictions in the area, there was no fire involved in the dance and aerialists performed instead. It was not held again until the 52nd Mountain Fair in 2023, when Garfield County was only under stage 1 fire restrictions.

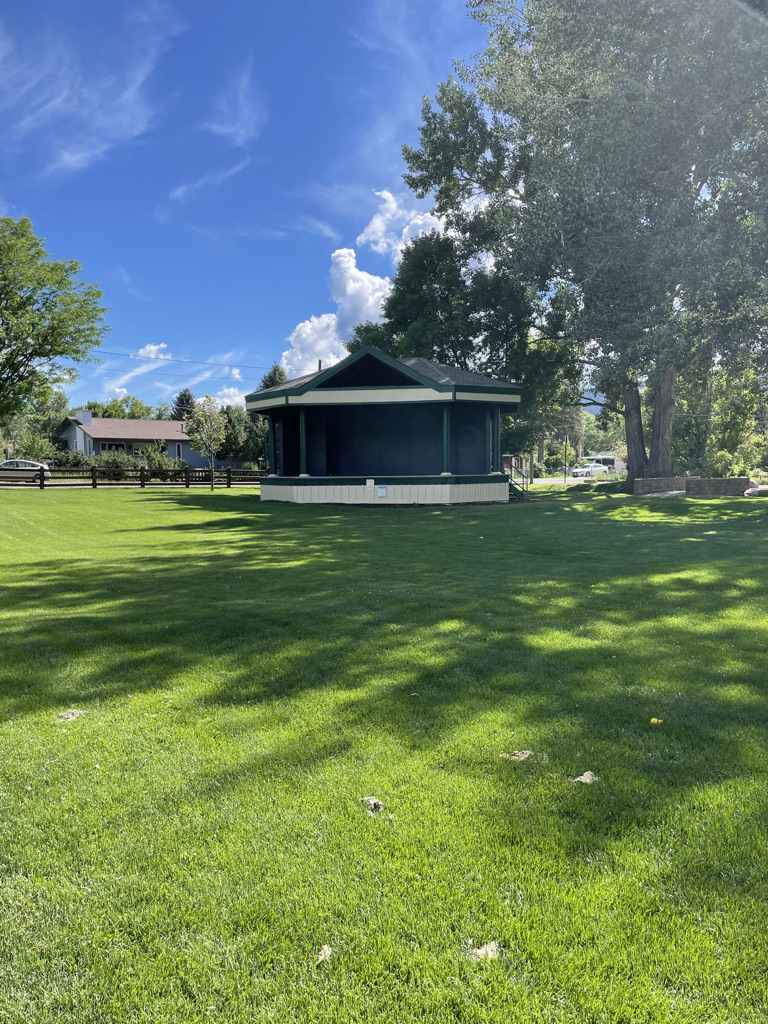
The gazebo where most live music and some entertainment happens at Mountain Fair

One of the first events held at Mountain Fair each year is the Rhythm of the Heart Community Drum Circle. It has been led by the fairs founder and first director, Laurie Loeb for more than two decades and has for many years had more than 400 participants.

The event also features live musical performances, primarily by musicians, bands and musical groups that are local to the area around Carbondale. Some local acts who have performed include Kan'Nal who performed in 2005 and Elephant Revival who performed in 2011, which are both Colorado based bands. A number of notable musicians, bands and musical groups have also performed, such as the three time Grammy award nominated band Blue Highway, the two time Grammy winning band Brave Combo, the Colombian musical group La Sonora Dinamita and the musical group MarchFourth Marching Band.

Many of the fair's events and music are broadcast live on the radio and on an online stream by the local Carbondale radio station KDNK.

The fair has also had a 90%+ landfill diversion rate for over 10 years. A notable reason for this is that all fair vendors are required to only use zero waste supplies.
