= Cattle Creek =

Cattle Creek may refer to:

== Australia ==
- Cattle Creek (New South Wales), a partly perennial stream of the Hunter River catchment
- Cattle Creek, Queensland (North Burnett Region), a locality
- Cattle Creek, Queensland (Toowoomba Region), a locality
- Cattle Creek Station, part of Wave Hill Station, Northern Territory

== United States ==
- Cattle Creek, Colorado, a census-designated place
- Cattle Creek (Roaring Fork River tributary), a stream in Colorado
- Cattle Creek Campground, a historic church campground and national historic district near Rowesville, South Carolina
