= Roaring Fork Valley =

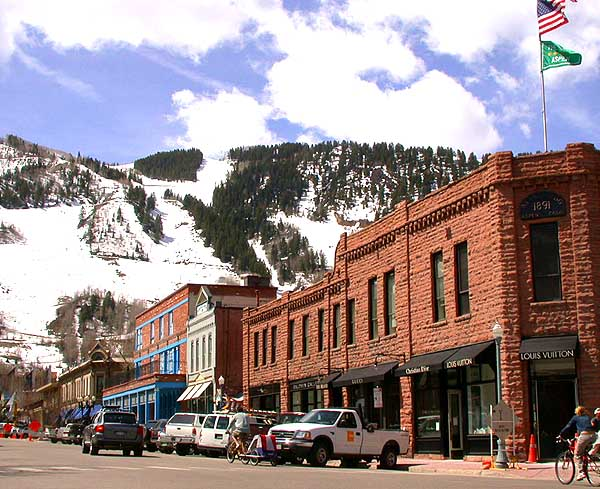
- Aspen

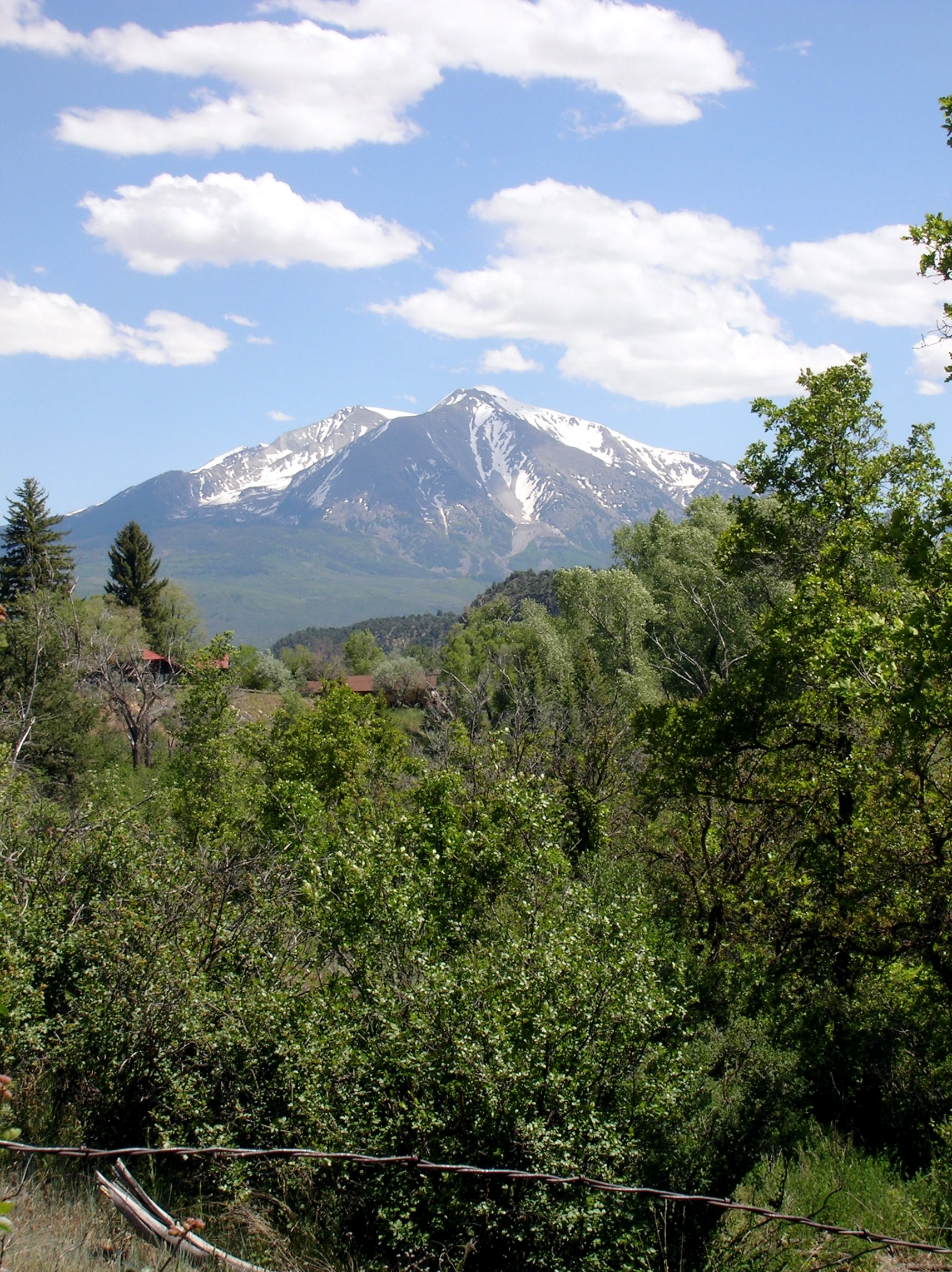
- Carbondale

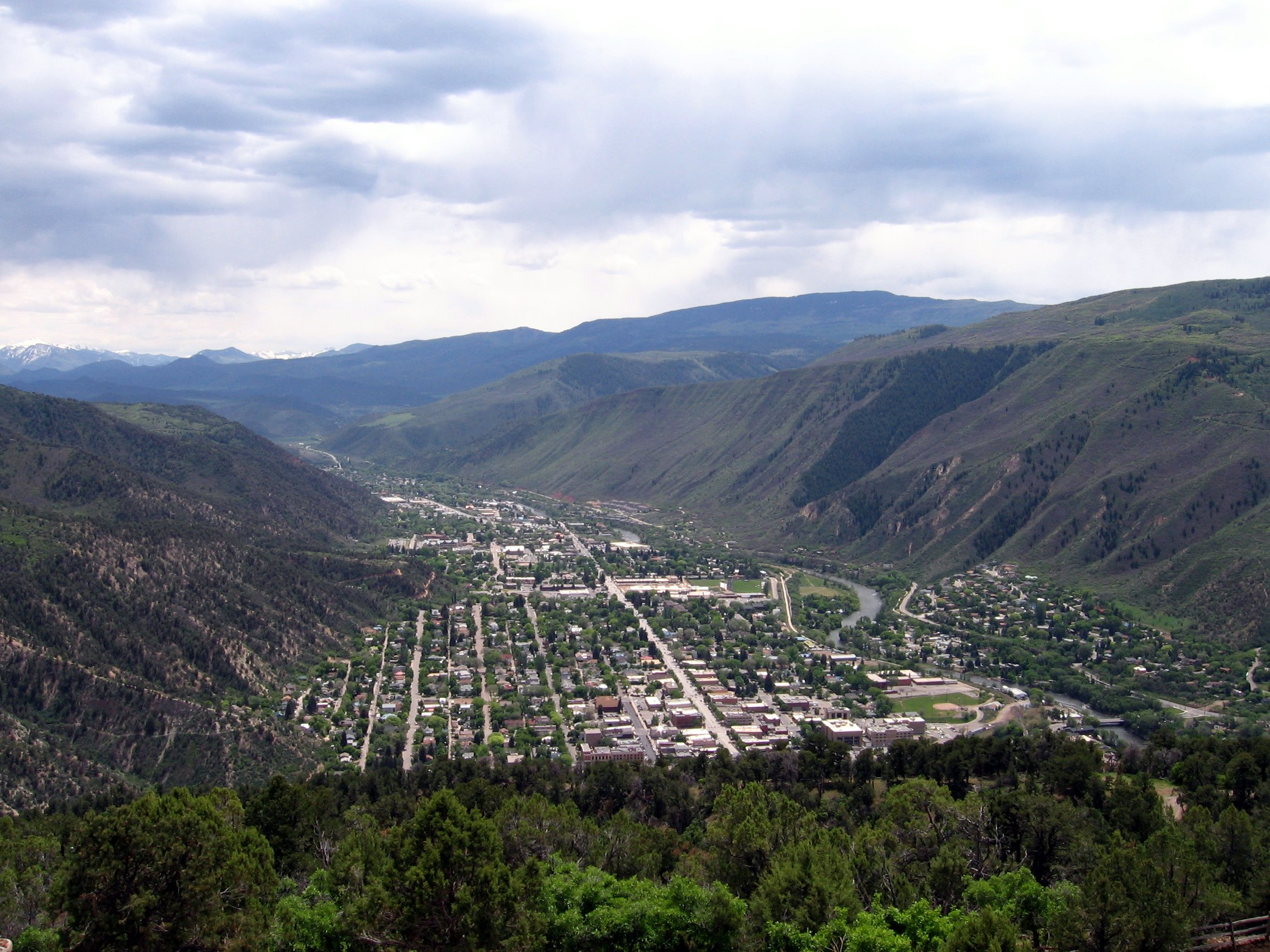
- Glenwood Springs
- Country: United States
- State: Colorado
- Major cities: Glenwood Springs: Aspen; Carbondale; Basalt

Population (2010 est. 2022 est.)
- 32,179
- 40,000
- Time zone: UTC−7 (Mountain Standard Time/MST)
  - Summer (DST): UTC−6 (MDT)

The Roaring Fork Valley is a geographical region in western Colorado in the United States. The Roaring Fork Valley is one of the most affluent regions in Colorado and the U.S. as well as one of the most populous and economically vital areas of the Colorado Western Slope. The Valley is defined by the valley of the Roaring Fork River and its tributaries, including the Crystal and Fryingpan River. It includes the communities of Aspen, Snowmass Village, Basalt, Carbondale, and Glenwood Springs. Mount Sopris and the Roaring Fork River serve as symbols of the Roaring Fork Valley.

== History ==
The valley was inhabited by the Ute people prior to the coming of the first U.S. settlers over Independence Pass in 1879. The first settlers were prospectors looking for silver in the wake of the Colorado Silver Boom in nearby Leadville. Aspen flourished as a mining community in the late 1880s and early 1890s until the silver crash of 1893. In the late 19th century and early 20th century, coal mining in the valley of the Crystal emerged as an important extractive industry, one that has nearly entirely vanished (coal is still extracted south of McClure Pass in the nearby North Fork Valley).

== Geography ==
The Roaring Fork Valley is part of the larger Roaring Fork Watershed, which includes the Fryingpan and Crystal River valleys. The valley extends for approximately 50 mi (80 km) southeast to northwest from Aspen northwest to Glenwood Springs at the mouth of the Roaring Fork on the Colorado River, ranging in width between 1 and 5 mi (1.6 and 8.0 km). It is surrounded by mountains on all sides, in particular on its southwest edge by the high Elk Mountains that are location of the Aspen/Snowmass ski resorts. The upper (southeast) end of the valley is sometimes called the Aspen Valley, but locals simply refer to it as "up-valley" - Aspen - and "down-valley" - Glenwood Springs. Mount Sopris dominates the lower (northwest) end of the valley and serves as an unofficial symbol of the region. Many think the Roaring Fork River, from which the valley was named, is the unofficial symbol of the region.

== Politics ==
The politics of the Roaring Fork Watershed are somewhat complex, arising principally from the fact that the watershed is split awkwardly among four different counties: Pitkin (Aspen), Eagle County (Basalt), Garfield County (Glenwood Springs, Carbondale), and Gunnison County. The fragmented structure is in contrast to the nearby Eagle Valley, which lies entirely within Eagle County.

== Economy ==
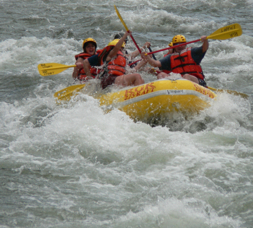
Whitewater rafting in the Valley.

The main economic engine of the valley is the Aspen/Snowmass recreational skiing complex which directly or indirectly drives the related tourism, hospitality, retail, construction, real estate, professional service and property maintenance industries. Although skiing forms the foundation of the economy, other activities increasingly contribute to visitor numbers. Non-winter recreational and cultural activities such as fly fishing on the Fryingpan and whitewater rafting on the Roaring Fork, hiking near the Maroon Bells in the Maroon Bells–Snowmass Wilderness, enjoying the caverns and hot springs in Glenwood Springs, the Aspen Institute and Rocky Mountain Institute conferences, the Aspen Music Festival, and other cultural events attract visitors year-round. Although the valley floor is largely privately owned, most of the surrounding highlands are within the White River National Forest and are another source of recreation and tourism. Agriculture, principally livestock raising, plays a very moderate and declining role in the valley's economy. However, the ranches that still cover large parts of the lower valley contribute to tourism. Potato cultivation has historically been important in the lower valley, but is virtually nonexistent at present.

== Populace ==
The valley has been one of the most rapidly growing areas of Colorado in recent years, not only in the vicinity of Aspen, but notably in the lower end of the valley below Basalt. The communities of Basalt and Carbondale have served as bedroom communities for day workers in Aspen, where high property values have increasingly strained the ability of low and middle-income workers to afford the cost of living, though the affluence that marks the Upper Roaring Fork Valley is gradually leaking into the rest of the Valley. Many employees in Glenwood Springs live further down the Colorado river due to the same acute lack of affordable housing.

State Highway 82 serves as the principal transportation artery of the valley, having many freeway characteristics. The once rural character of much of the valley has been replaced with nearly continuous development linking the region's four main cities. Though parts of the valley are largely rural, the valley is served by a public transportation system called the Roaring Fork Transportation Authority, which provides public transit along the commuting route between Aspen and Glenwood Springs.

=== Communities ===
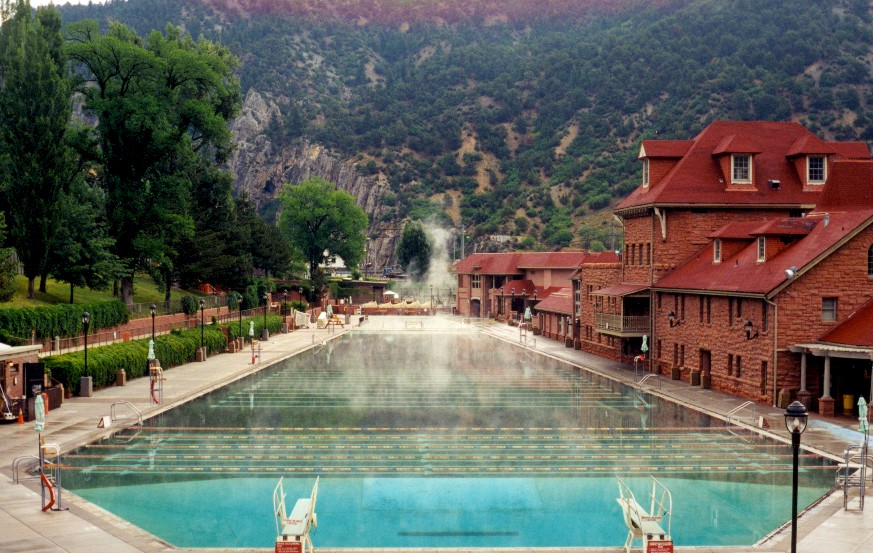
The healing waters of Glenwood Springs

- City of Aspen
- Town of Basalt
- Town of Carbondale
- Catherine
- Cattle Creek
- El Jebel
- Mulford
- City of Glenwood Springs
- Satank
- Town of Snowmass Village
- Snowmass (colloquially called "Old Snowmass")
- Woody Creek
- Town of Marble (Crystal Valley)
- Meredith (Fryingpan Valley)
- No Name (Glenwood Canyon)
- Redstone (Crystal Valley)
