= Catherine, Colorado =

Unincorporated community in Colorado, US

- Census-designated place
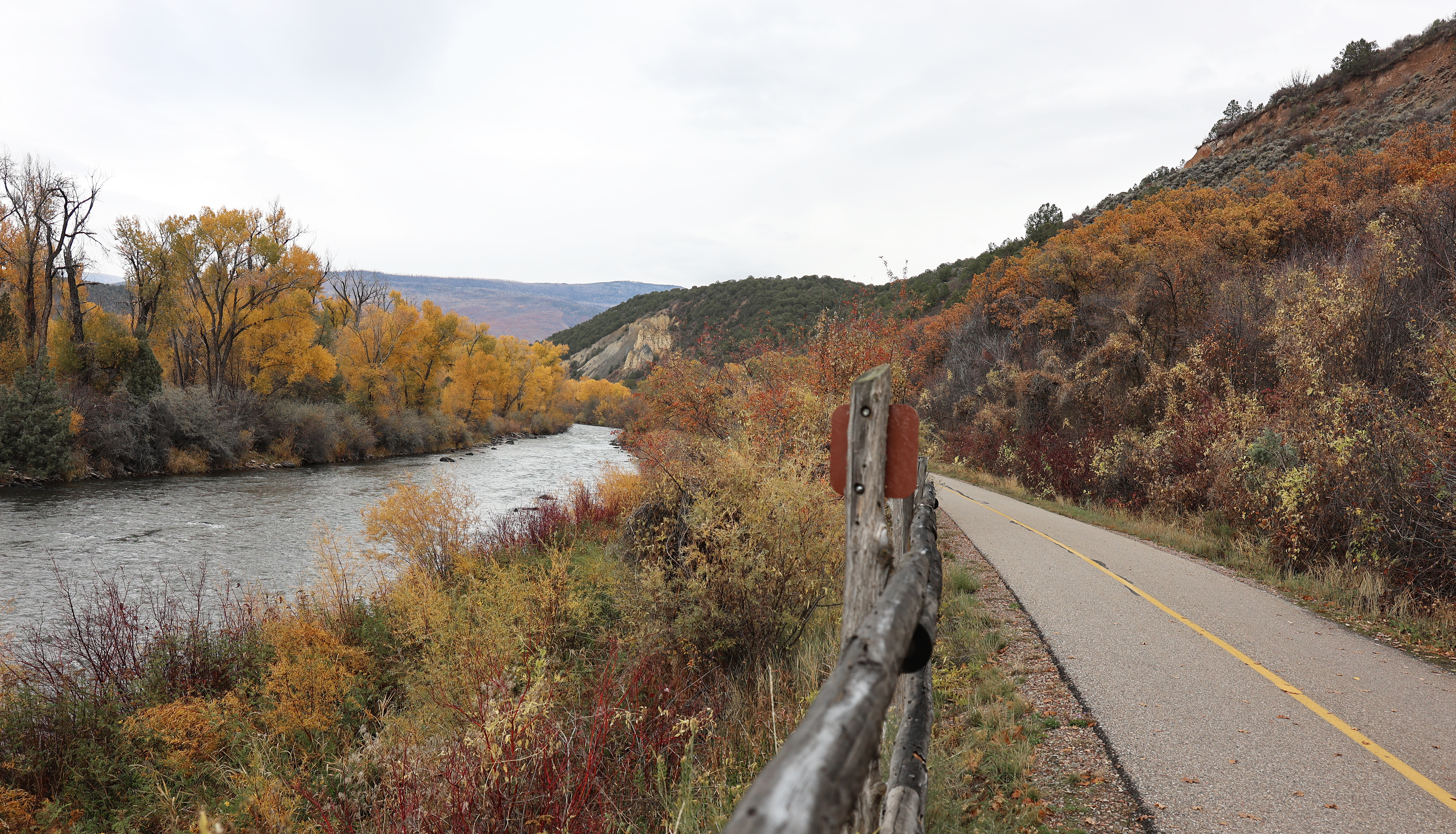
- The Roaring Fork River and the Rio Grande Trail in Catherine (2025)

- Location of the Catherine CDP in Garfield County, Colorado
- Coordinates: 39°24′08″N 107°07′56″W
- Country: United States
- State: Colorado
- County: Garfield

Government
  - Type: unincorporated community
  - Body: Garfield County

Area
  - Total: 0.858 sq mi (2.223 km^{2})
  - Land: 0.858 sq mi (2.223 km^{2})
  - Water: 0 sq mi (0.000 km^{2})
- Elevation: 6,286 ft (1,916 m)

Population (2020)
  - Total: 235
  - Density: 274/sq mi (106/km^{2})
- Time zone: UTC−07:00 (MST)
  - Summer (DST): UTC−06:00 (MDT)
- ZIP code: Carbondale 81623
- Area codes: 970/748
- GNIS CDP ID: 2583220
- FIPS code: 08-12460

Catherine is an unincorporated community and a census-designated place (CDP) located in southeastern Garfield County, Colorado, United States. The CDP is a part of the Rifle, CO Micropolitan Statistical Area. The population of the Catherine CDP was 235 at the United States Census 2020.

== History ==
The Catherin, Colorado, [sic] post office operated from October 18, 1892, until February 15, 1902. The Carbondale post office (ZIP Code 81623) serves the area.

== Geography ==
The CDP is located in the southeast corner of Garfield County, in the valley of the Roaring Fork River. Colorado State Highway 82 forms the northern edge of the CDP; it leads northwest 16 miles (26 km) to Glenwood Springs, the Garfield County seat, and southeast 24 miles (39 km) to Aspen. Catherine is bordered to the west by Mulford and to the east by El Jebel in Eagle County. The town of Carbondale is 5 miles (8 km) to the west.

The Catherine CDP has an area of 549 acres (2.223 km^{2}), all land.

== Demographics ==
Catherine CDP, Colorado
Year	Pop.	±%
2010	228	—
2020	235	+3.1%
Source: United States Census Bureau

The United States Census Bureau initially defined the Catherine CDP for the United States Census 2010.

== Education ==
It is in the Roaring Fork School District RE-1.

== See also ==
- Rifle, CO Micropolitan Statistical Area
- Edwards-Rifle, CO Combined Statistical Area
