= Glenwood Springs High School =

Location
- 1521 Grand Avenue; Glenwood Springs, Colorado 81601; United States; 39°32′19″N 107°19′40″W

Information
- Type: Public
- School district: Roaring Fork School District Re-1
- CEEB code: 060665
- Principal: Paul Freeman
- Teaching staff: 55.29 (on an FTE basis)
- Grades: 9–12
- Enrollment: 1,036 (2023–2024)
- Student to teacher ratio: 18.74
- Colors: Red and white
- Athletics conference: Western Slope League
- Team name: Demons
- Newspaper: The Brimstone
- Website: gshs.rfsd.k12.co.us

Glenwood Springs High School is a high school in Glenwood Springs, Colorado, United States. It is a owned and operated by the Roaring Fork School District Re-1, which is headquartered in Carbondale.
