= Rio Grande Trail (Colorado) =

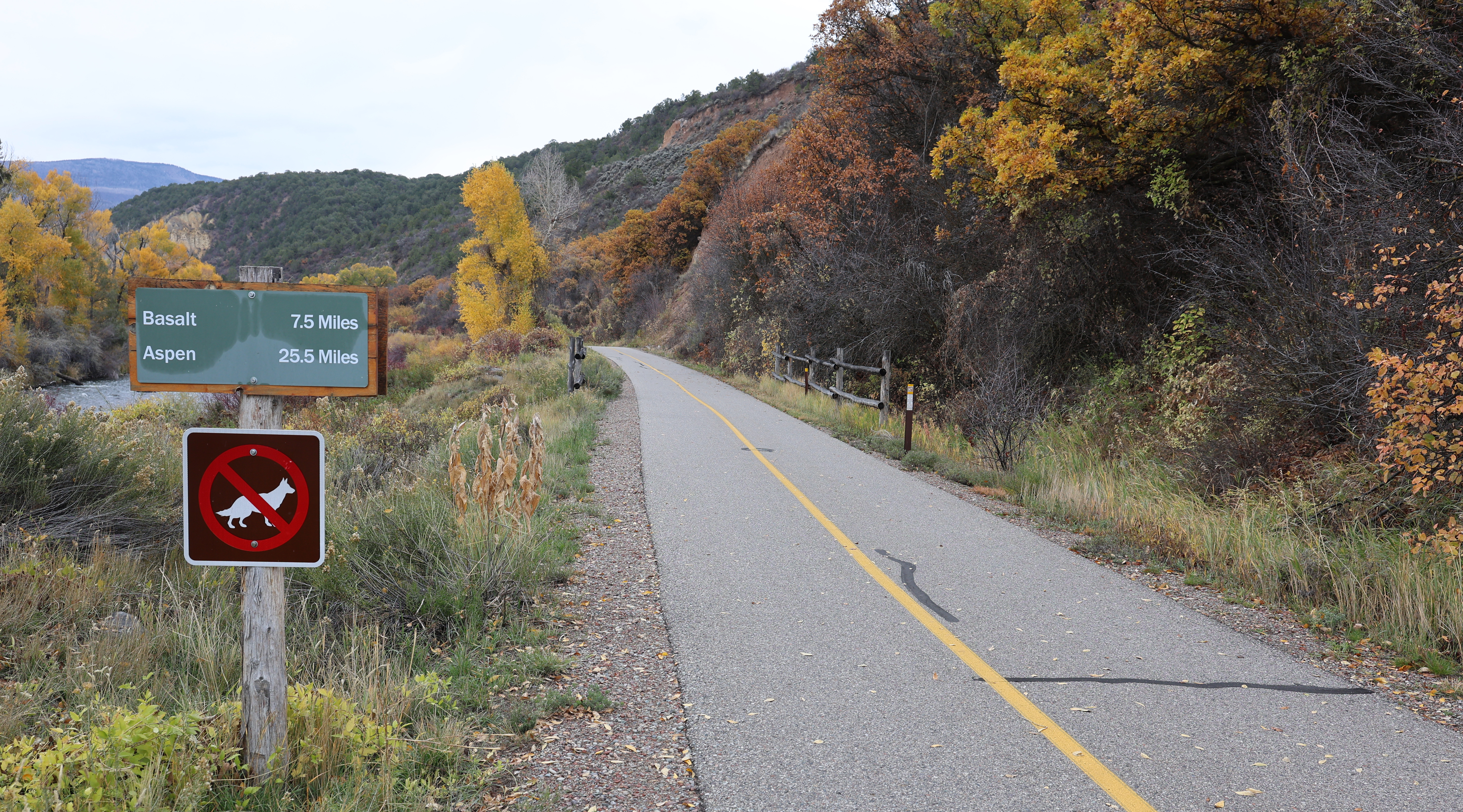
The trail at Catherine, Colorado

The Rio Grande Trail is a rail trail in Garfield, Eagle and Pitkin counties in west central Colorado in the United States. It follows the Aspen Branch right-of-way of the former Denver and Rio Grande Western Railroad from Aspen, a former mining town and contemporary ski resort, to Glenwood Springs, a mountain town along the Colorado River. Generally following the Roaring Fork River, the rail line was gradually abandoned from the 1960s to the mid-1990s, the trail corridor was purchased in 1997, and the trail officially opened in 2008.

== The trail ==
The trail is 42 miles (68 kilometers) long. All the trail is paved with asphalt or concrete, except for a two-mile portion near Aspen paved with compacted gravel. The pavement varies from 8 to 10 feet (2.4 to 3.0 meters) wide, and the shoulders, made of a soft surface, range from 2 to 6 feet (0.61 to 1.83 meters) wide. The trail never exceeds a 3% grade. Its high point lies at 7,889 feet (2,405 meters) above sea level.

== Trail users ==
The trail is open to people on foot or on horseback and people using human-powered equipment like bicycles, in-line skates, and skateboards. Both motorized and non-motorized wheelchairs are permitted, and some other power-driven mobility devices (OPDMDs) are allowed under certain conditions. Many visitors prefer to ride bicycles on the trail starting at Aspen, the highest point along the trail, riding or coasting downhill to Glenwood Springs, the lowest point.

== Management ==
Most of the trail is managed by the Roaring Fork Transportation Authority, the agency that runs the local bus service throughout the Roaring Fork Valley. Pitkin County Open Space manages the section of the trail that lies in unincorporated Pitkin County, and the City of Aspen manages the section that is within Aspen proper.
