= KDNK =

- Glenwood Springs, Colorado; United States
- Broadcast area: Roaring Fork Valley
- Frequency: 88.1 MHz

Programming
- Format: Variety

Ownership
- Owner: Carbondale Community Access Radio, Inc.

History
- First air date: April 15, 1983

Technical information
- Licensing authority: FCC
- Facility ID: 88445
- Class: C2
- ERP: 1,200 watts (horiz.); 1,070 watts (vert.)
- HAAT: 775 meters (2,543 ft)
- Transmitter coordinates: 39°25′08″N 107°22′10″W

Links
- Public license information: Public file; LMS
- Webcast: Listen live
- Website: kdnk.org

KDNK is a community access radio station with studios in Carbondale, Colorado.

The main transmitter broadcasts at 88.1 FM from Sunlight Mountain near Glenwood Springs. It broadcasts a format of music and local news in western Colorado in the United States. The station serves Carbondale, Aspen, Glenwood Springs, and other parts of the Roaring Fork Valley through its main transmitter and a series of mountain-top translators stretching from the Crystal Valley to Leadville.

The station is owned by Carbondale Community Access Radio, Inc., a 501(c)(3) non-profit.

== Station history ==
The original idea for KDNK came from Lee Swidler, who placed an ad in the local newspapers looking for volunteers to help start a community radio station. Among the first to volunteer were Bruce Stolbach, Bill Phillips, Brian Vancil, Jim Groh, Brenda Jochems, Pat Noel, Wick Moses, and Marple Lewis, who met in Swidler's locksmith shop at night to plan their strategy. Using an NTIA grant and money pledged by local residents, KDNK took to the air on April 15, 1983. Today, the station has a small paid staff, roughly 100 volunteer program hosts, and a board of directors elected by its membership.

== Low powered translators ==
In addition to its main signal, KDNK radio also has low-powered translators throughout western Colorado.

Broadcast translators for KDNK-FM
Call sign	Frequency	City of license	FID	ERP (W)	Class	FCC info
K202AB	88.3 FM	West Glenwood Springs, Colorado	8763	5 (horiz.)	D	LMS
K202AT	88.3 FM	Aspen, Colorado	8765	9 (horiz.); 47 (vert.)	D	LMS
K203EG	88.5 FM	Basalt, Colorado	52699	10 (horiz.)	D	LMS
K203EH	88.5 FM	Redstone, Colorado	52710	10 (vert.)	D	LMS
K228AG	93.5 FM	Leadville, Colorado	36298	107 (horiz.)	D	LMS
K234BJ	94.7 FM	Old Snowmass, Colorado	138072	22	D	LMS
K235AP	94.9 FM	Thomasville, Colorado	138050	10 (vert.)	D	LMS
K260BZ	99.9 FM	Snowmass Village, Colorado	148736	23 (vert.)	D	LMS

== See also ==
- List of community radio stations in the United States
