= El Jebel, Colorado =

Census-designated place in Colorado, US

- census-designated place
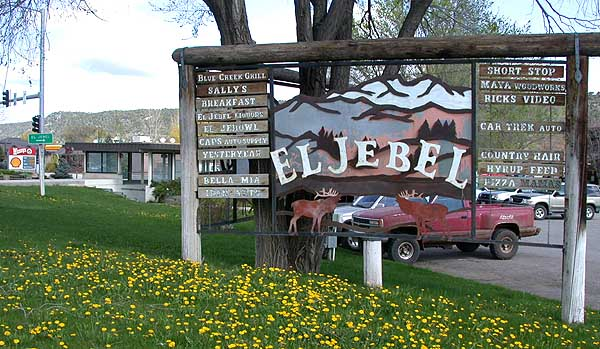
- El Jebel sign

- Location of the El Jebel CDP in Eagle County, Colorado
- Coordinates: 39°24′18″N 107°05′31″W
- Country: United States
- State: Colorado
- County: Eagle

Government
  - Type: unincorporated community
  - Body: Eagle County

Area
  - Total: 5.359 sq mi (13.880 km^{2})
  - Land: 5.305 sq mi (13.739 km^{2})
  - Water: 0.054 sq mi (0.141 km^{2})
- Elevation: 6,483 ft (1,976 m)

Population (2020)
  - Total: 4,130
  - Density: 779/sq mi (301/km^{2})
- Time zone: UTC−07:00 (MST)
  - Summer (DST): UTC−06:00 (MDT)
- ZIP code: (Carbondale) 81623
- Area codes: 970/748
- GNIS CDP ID: 2408058
- FIPS code: 08-23795

El Jebel is an unincorporated community and census-designated place located in and governed by Eagle County, Colorado, United States. The CDP is a part of the Edwards, CO Micropolitan Statistical Area and the Edwards-Rifle, CO Combined Statistical Area. The population of the El Jebel CDP was 4,130 at the United States Census 2020.

== History ==
The El Jebel, Colorado, post office operated from May 1, 1973, until October 4, 1976. The Carbondale, Colorado, post office (ZIP Code 81623) serves El Jebel postal addresses. El Jebel grew rapidly in the last two decades of the 20th century with the population increase in the valley downstream from Aspen. It consists largely of a group of commercial establishments just off State Highway 82, approximately 3 miles (5 km) northwest of Basalt, as well as several housing subdivisions nearby.

=== Etymology ===
"Al Jebel" means "the mountain" in Arabic.

== Geography ==
El Jebel is located in the Roaring Fork Valley, between Carbondale and Basalt, along the north side of State Highway 82.

The El Jebel CDP has an area of 3,430 acres (13.880 km^{2}), including 35 acres (0.141 km^{2}) of water.

=== Climate ===
This climate type is dominated by the winter season, a long, bitterly cold period with short, clear days, relatively little precipitation mostly in the form of snow, and low humidity. According to the Köppen Climate Classification system, El Jebel has a subarctic climate, abbreviated "Dfc" on climate maps.

Climate data for El Jebel, Colorado
Month	Jan	Feb	Mar	Apr	May	Jun	Jul	Aug	Sep	Oct	Nov	Dec	Year
Mean daily maximum °C (°F)	1 (33)	4 (39)	9 (48)	14 (58)	21 (69)	26 (78)	30 (86)	28 (83)	24 (75)	17 (63)	8 (47)	1 (34)	16 (60)
Mean daily minimum °C (°F)	−9 (15)	−7 (20)	−3 (27)	2 (35)	6 (43)	10 (50)	14 (58)	13 (56)	9 (48)	3 (38)	−3 (27)	−8 (18)	2 (36)
Average precipitation mm (inches)	43 (1.7)	38 (1.5)	43 (1.7)	53 (2.1)	43 (1.7)	30 (1.2)	30 (1.2)	43 (1.7)	43 (1.7)	46 (1.8)	41 (1.6)	41 (1.6)	500 (19.5)
Source: Weatherbase

== Demographics ==
The United States Census Bureau initially defined the El Jebel CDP for the 1990 United States census.

El Jebel CDP, Colorado
Year	Pop.	±%
1990	2,605	—
2000	4,488	+72.3%
2010	3,801	−15.3%
2020	4,130	+8.7%
Source: United States Census Bureau

=== 2020 census ===
As of the 2020 census, the median age was 37.3 years. 23.5% of residents were under the age of 18 and 11.6% of residents were 65 years of age or older. For every 100 females there were 105.7 males, and for every 100 females age 18 and over there were 105.1 males age 18 and over.

75.1% of residents lived in urban areas, while 24.9% lived in rural areas.

There were 1,328 households in El Jebel, of which 39.3% had children under the age of 18 living in them. Of all households, 60.7% were married-couple households, 14.6% were households with a male householder and no spouse or partner present, and 18.1% were households with a female householder and no spouse or partner present. About 14.6% of all households were made up of individuals and 5.4% had someone living alone who was 65 years of age or older.

There were 1,396 housing units, of which 4.9% were vacant. The homeowner vacancy rate was 0.3% and the rental vacancy rate was 0.8%.

Racial composition as of the 2020 census
Race	Number	Percent
White	2,366	57.3%
Black or African American	12	0.3%
American Indian and Alaska Native	65	1.6%
Asian	50	1.2%
Native Hawaiian and Other Pacific Islander	25	0.6%
Some other race	910	22.0%
Two or more races	702	17.0%
Hispanic or Latino (of any race)	1,733	42.0%

== Education ==
It is in the Roaring Fork School District RE-1.

== See also ==
- Edwards-Rifle, CO Combined Statistical Area
