= Cattle Creek, Colorado =

Unincorporated community in Colorado, US

- Census-designated place
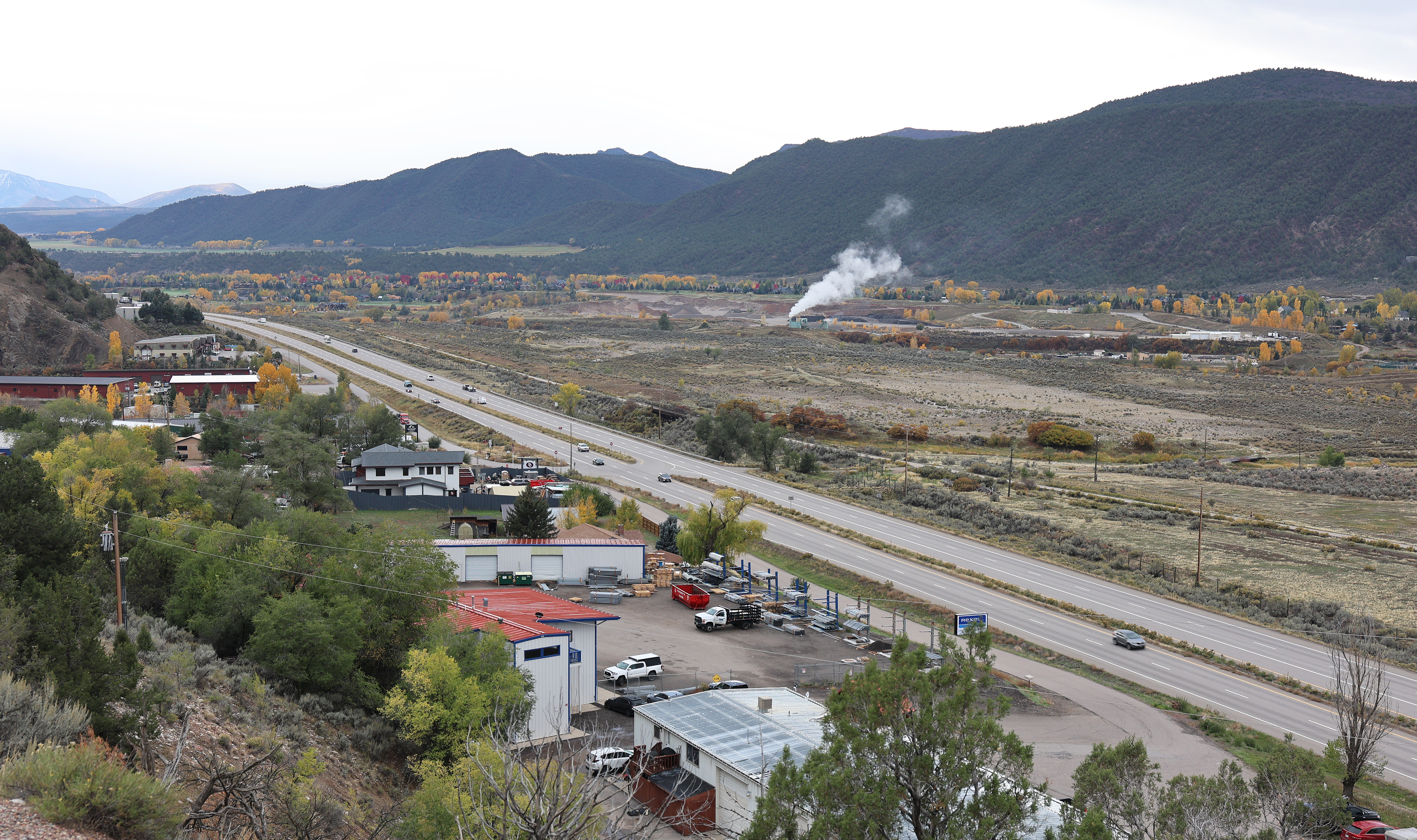
- Cattle Creek (bottom), State Highway 82, and part of the Roaring Fork Valley

- Location of the Cattle Creek CDP in Garfield County, Colorado
- Coordinates: 39°28′01″N 107°15′14″W
- Country: United States
- State: Colorado
- County: Garfield

Government
  - Type: Census-designated place
  - Body: Garfield County

Area
  - Total: 1.295 sq mi (3.355 km^{2})
  - Land: 1.295 sq mi (3.355 km^{2})
  - Water: 0 sq mi (0.000 km^{2})
- Elevation: 6,040 ft (1,840 m)

Population (2020)
  - Total: 662
  - Density: 511/sq mi (197/km^{2})
- Time zone: UTC−07:00 (MST)
  - Summer (DST): UTC−06:00 (MDT)
- ZIP code: Glenwood Springs 81601
- Area codes: 970/748
- GNIS CDP ID: 2583221
- FIPS code: 08-12470

Cattle Creek is an unincorporated community and a census-designated place (CDP) located in southeastern Garfield County, Colorado, United States. The CDP is a part of the Rifle, CO Micropolitan Statistical Area. The population of the Cattle Creek CDP was 662 at the United States Census 2020. The Glenwood Springs post office (Zip Code 81601) serves the area.

== Geography ==
The CDP is located in southeastern Garfield County along Colorado State Highway 82 in the valley of the Roaring Fork River. Cattle Creek, a tributary of the Roaring Fork, forms the southern edge of the CDP. Highway 82 leads north 7 miles (11 km) to Glenwood Springs, the county seat, and south 6 miles (10 km) to Carbondale.

The Cattle Creek CDP has an area of 829 acres (3.355 km^{2}), all land.

The community takes its name from Cattle Creek, a stream that flows through it.

== Demographics ==
Cattle Creek CDP, Colorado
Year	Pop.	±%
2010	641	—
2020	662	+3.3%
Source: United States Census Bureau

The United States Census Bureau initially defined the Cattle Creek CDP for the United States Census 2010.

== Education ==
It is in the Roaring Fork School District RE-1.

== See also ==
- Rifle, CO Micropolitan Statistical Area
- Edwards-Rifle, CO Combined Statistical Area
