= Mulford, Colorado =

Census-designated place in Garfield County, CO, USA

- Census-designated place
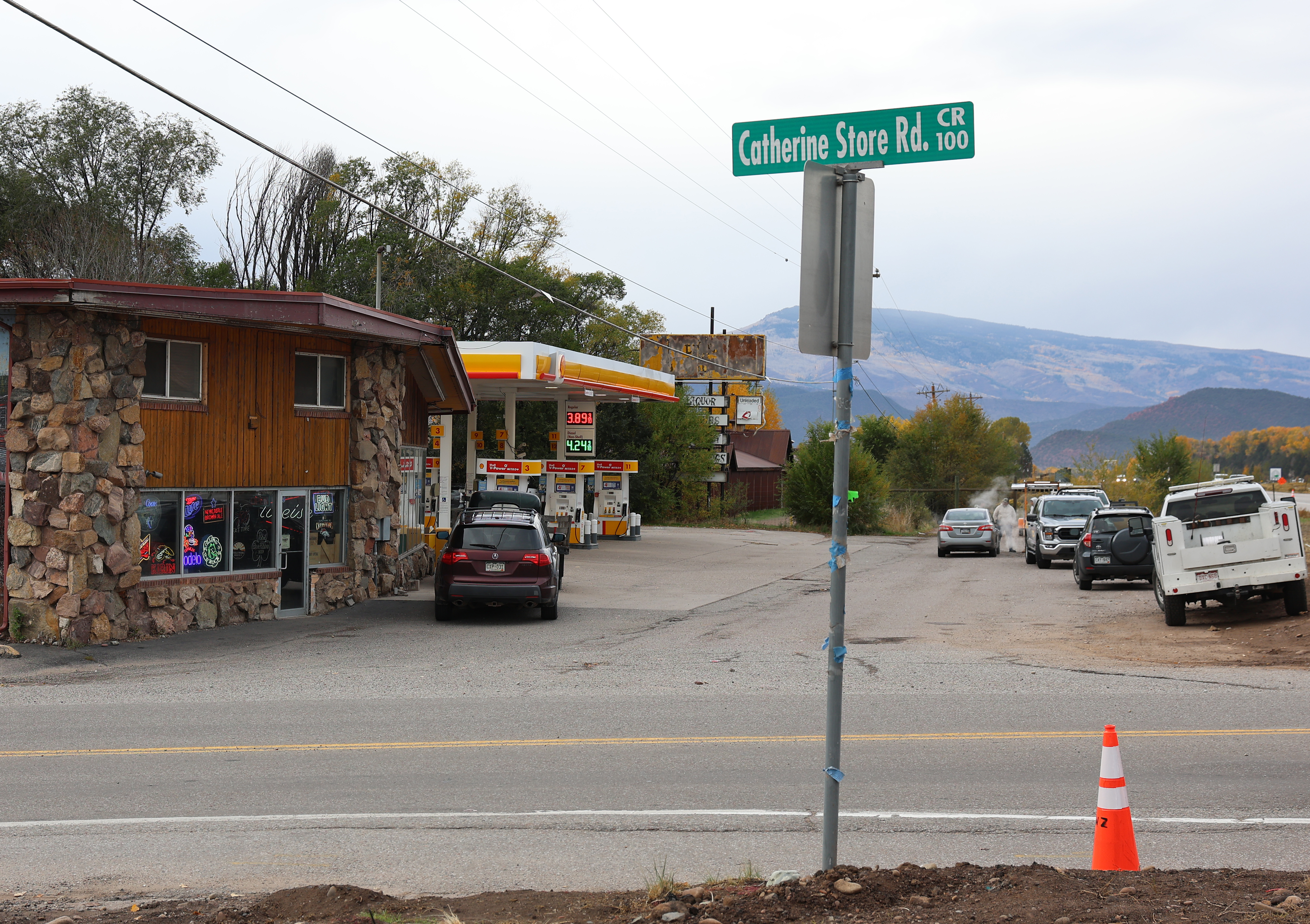
- Businesses on the northwest side of Catherine Store Road in Mulford

- Location of the Mulford CDP in Garfield County, Colorado
- Coordinates: 39°24′23″N 107°09′58″W
- Country: United States
- State: Colorado
- County: Garfield County

Government
  - Type: unincorporated community

Area
  - Total: 0.668 sq mi (1.731 km^{2})
  - Land: 0.668 sq mi (1.731 km^{2})
  - Water: 0 sq mi (0.000 km^{2})
- Elevation: 6,237 ft (1,901 m)

Population (2020)
  - Total: 259
  - Density: 388/sq mi (150/km^{2})
- Time zone: UTC-7 (MST)
  - Summer (DST): UTC-6 (MDT)
- ZIP Code: Carbondale 81623
- Area code: 970
- GNIS feature: 2583270

Mulford is a Census-designated place (CDP) in and governed by Garfield County, Colorado, United States. The CDP is a part of the Glenwood Springs, CO Micropolitan Statistical Area. The population of the Mulford CDP was 259 at the United States Census 2020. The Carbondale post office (Zip Code 81623) serves the area.

== Geography ==
Mulford is located in southeastern Garfield County, in the Roaring Fork River valley. It is bordered to the east by Catherine. Colorado State Highway 82 forms the northern edge of the Mulford CDP, leading northwest 14 miles (23 km) to Glenwood Springs, the county seat, and southeast 27 miles (43 km) to Aspen. The town of Carbondale is 3 miles (5 km) to the west.

The Mulford CDP has an area of 428 acres (1.731 km^{2}), all land.

== Demographics ==
Mulford CDP, Colorado
Year	Pop.	±%
2010	174	—
2020	259	+48.9%
Source: United States Census Bureau

The United States Census Bureau initially defined the Mulford CDP for the United States Census 2010.

== Education ==
It is in the Roaring Fork School District RE-1.

== See also ==
- List of census-designated places in Colorado
