= Roaring Fork School District =

School district in Colorado, United States

Roaring Fork School District RE-1 (RFSD) is a school district headquartered in Carbondale, Colorado.

== History ==
In May 2022 Jesus Rodríguez became the superintendent. On October 25, 2023, Rodríguez left his position.

Anna Cole, previously the interim superintendent, became the established superintendent in 2024. Her contract is for three years.

== District boundary ==
In Garfield County, the district includes the municipalities of Carbondale and Glenwood Springs and the census-designated places of Catherine, Cattle Creek, Chacra, Mulford, and No Name.

In Eagle County, the district includes El Jebel CDP and that county's portion of the town of Basalt.

In Pitkin County, the district includes parts of the municipality of Snowmass Village and the CDPs of Norrie and Redstone as well as the remainder of Basalt town.

== Schools ==
High schools

- Basalt High School
- Glenwood Springs High School
- Roaring Fork High School (Carbondale)
- Bridges High School (alternative, grades 11-12), in Carbondale

PreK-8 schools

- Carbondale Community School
- Riverview School (Glenwood Springs)

Middle schools

- Basalt Middle School (grades 5-8)
- Carbondale Middle School (grades 5-8)
- Glenwood Springs Middle School (grades 6-8)

Elementary schools

- Basalt Elementary School (preschool-grade 4)
- Crystal River Elementary School (Carbondale) (grades K-4)
- Glenwood Springs Elementary School (grades PreK-5)
- Sopris Elementary School (Glenwood Springs) (grades K-5)
