= Chacra, Colorado =

Unincorporated community in Colorado, US

- Census-designated place
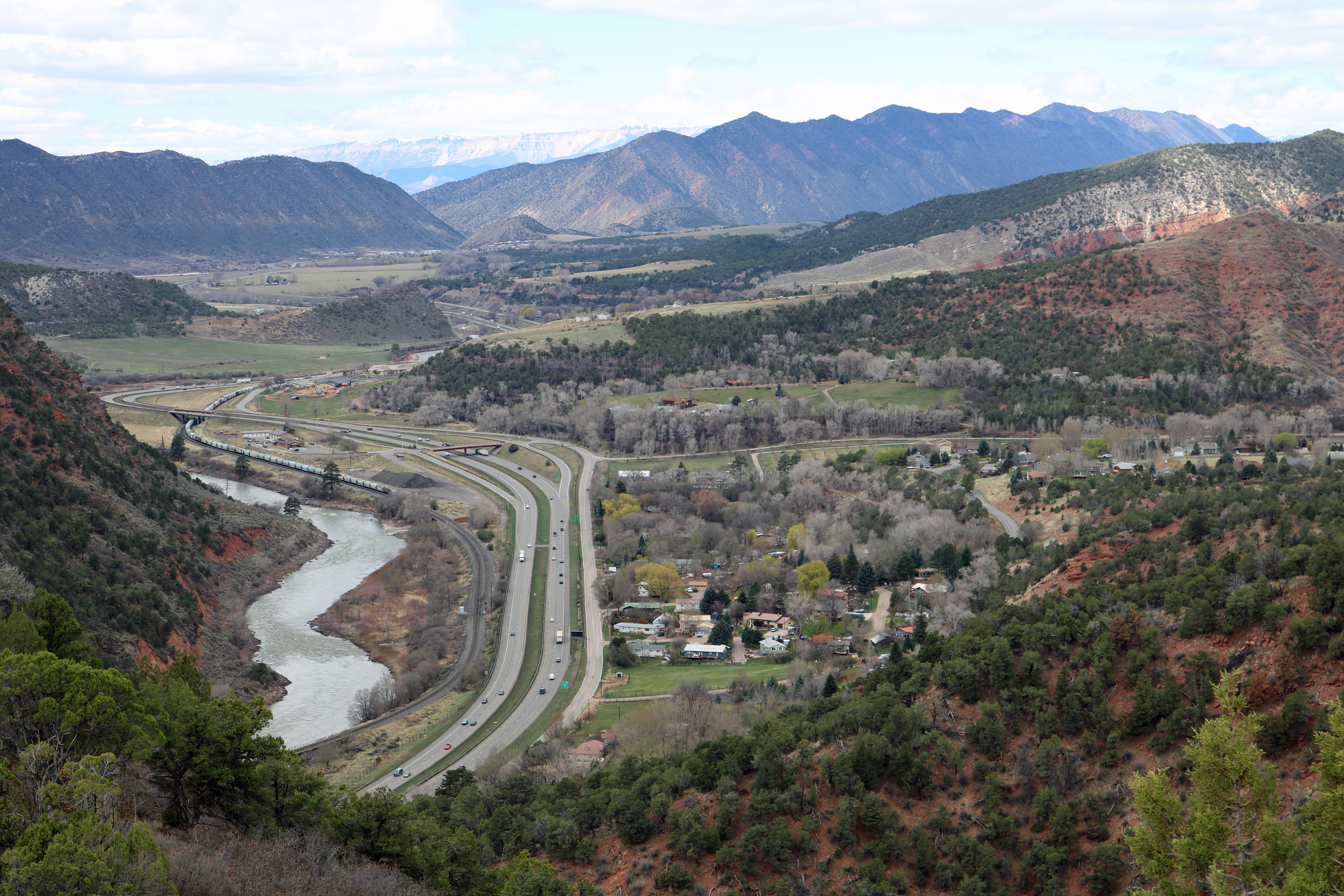
- The Colorado River, Interstate 70, and Chacra.

- Location of the Chacra CDP in Garfield County, Colorado
- Coordinates: 39°34′37″N 107°27′03″W
- Country: United States
- State: Colorado
- County: Garfield

Government
  - Type: unincorporated community
  - Body: Garfield County

Area
  - Total: 0.984 sq mi (2.549 km^{2})
  - Land: 0.946 sq mi (2.450 km^{2})
  - Water: 0.038 sq mi (0.099 km^{2})
- Elevation: 5,633 ft (1,717 m)

Population (2020)
  - Total: 331
  - Density: 350/sq mi (135/km^{2})
- Time zone: UTC−07:00 (MST)
  - Summer (DST): UTC−06:00 (MDT)
- ZIP code: Glenwood Springs 81601
- Area codes: 970/748
- GNIS CDP ID: 2583222
- FIPS code: 08-12945

Chacra is an unincorporated community and a census-designated place (CDP) located in Garfield County, Colorado, United States. The unincorporated community is a part of the Rifle, CO Micropolitan Statistical Area and the Edwards-Rifle, CO Combined Statistical Area. The population of the Chacra CDP was 331 at the United States Census 2020.

== History ==
Chacra has never had its own post office. The Glenwood Springs, Colorado, post office (ZIP code 81601) serves the area.

== Geography ==
Chacra is located on the north side of Colorado River, 8 miles (13 km) west of Glenwood Springs, the county seat. Interstate 70 passes through the community, with access from Exit 109.

The Chacra CDP has an area of 630 acres (2.549 km^{2}), including 24 acres (0.099 km^{2}) of water.

== Demographics ==
Chacra CDP, Colorado
Year	Pop.	±%
2010	329	—
2020	331	+0.6%
Source: United States Census Bureau

The United States Census Bureau initially defined the Chacra CDP for the United States Census 2010.

== Education ==
It is in the Roaring Fork School District RE-1.

== See also ==
- Rifle, CO Micropolitan Statistical Area
