= Roaring Fork Transportation Authority =

Public transport agency in the Roaring Fork Valley, Colorado

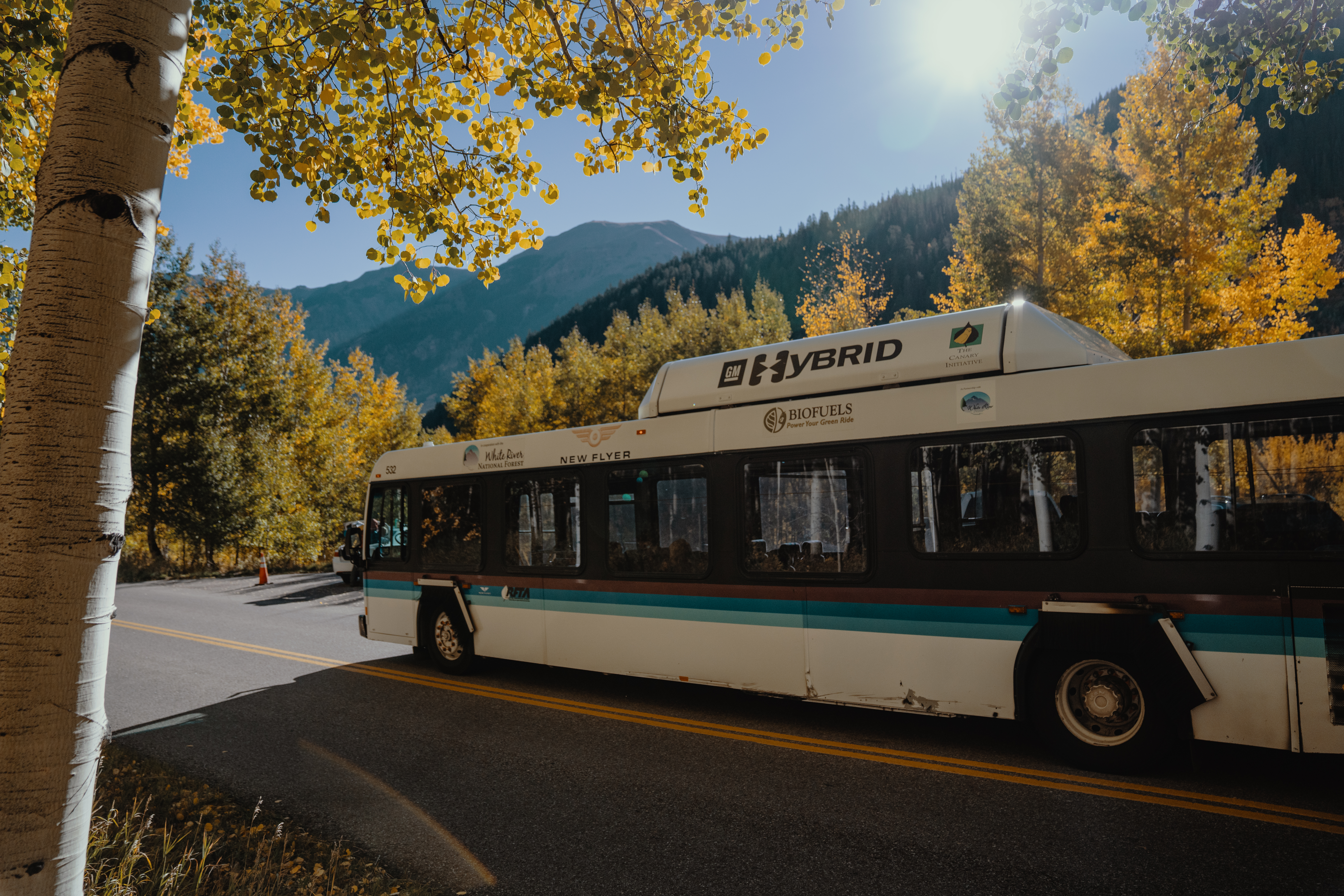
- A hybrid electric bus brings visitors to and from the picturesque Maroon Bells on an autumn morning.
- Founded: 1983
- Headquarters: 0051 Service Center Drive, Aspen, Colorado 81611
- Locale: Roaring Fork Valley, Colorado
- Service area: Garfield County; Eagle County; Pitkin County
- Service type: Local and express bus Bus rapid transit Tour bus Dial-a-ride; Paratransit; Rail trail
- Routes: 15 year-round 3 seasonal
- Fleet: 106 transit buses 9 paratransit buses
- Annual ridership: 5 million (2024); 4.8 million (2023); 4.2 million (2022); 3.2 million (2021); 2.6 million (2020); 5.47 million (2019)
- Fuel type: Biodiesel, CNG, Gas, Battery electric
- CEO: Kurt Ravenschlag
- Website: www.rfta.com

The Roaring Fork Transportation Authority (RFTA; pronounced /ræftə/) is an agency that operates public transportation for the Roaring Fork Valley in Colorado. RFTA's service area stretches 70 miles (110 km) from Aspen to Rifle, serving the towns in between consisting of Basalt, Snowmass Village, Carbondale, Glenwood Springs, New Castle, and Silt. RFTA also operates seasonal ski shuttles, Maroon Bells Shuttles, Paratransit, and manages 41 miles of the Rio Grande Trail.

According to 2025 statistics kept of the Federal Transit Administration (FTA), RFTA has the second highest ridership of all transit agencies in Colorado (after the Regional Transportation District of Denver). The agency also has the highest ridership of any United States transit provider receiving federal aid under FTA's Formula Grants for Rural Areas program (49 U.S.C. § 5311). In September 2013, RFTA became the first rural transit provider to construct and operate bus rapid transit in the United States.

== History ==
Transportation in the Roaring Fork Valley dates back to the late-1880s, when the Denver and Rio Grande Railroad ran their first train to Glenwood Springs on October 5, 1887. The railroad continued extending their line upvalley to Aspen, completing the Aspen Branch on October 27, 1887. Denver and Rio Grande's competitor, Colorado Midland Railway, reached Aspen the same year, and completed their connection downvalley to Glenwood Springs on December 9, 1887. The Colorado Midland Railway's route was later converted to Colorado State Highway 82 (SH 82). In 1890, Aspen's economy boomed after the passing of the Sherman Silver Purchase Act, becoming the largest silver producer in the United States. In June, the Aspen City Railway opened a 1.2 mi (1.9 km) narrow gauge horsecar line that zigzagged through the city. The system was the smallest in the state, owning only two cars and five horses. The repeal of the Sherman Silver Purchase Act in 1983, Aspen's economy collapsed, and it is assumed operations were abandoned sometime afterwards. Due to early abandonment, the Aspen City Railway never converted to electric streetcars as was common during that time.

RFTA's origins dates back to the mid-1970s when the City of Aspen and Piktin County implemented separate free transit services for the area, Aspen Free Shuttle and Pitkin County Bus, respectively. Aspen Free Shuttle operated fixed routes within the city and to Aspen Skiing Company mountains, while Pitkin County bus operated on the SH 82 corridor to El Jebel. In 1983 the Roaring Fork Transit Agency (RFTA) was formed by merging the two systems, funded by a 1¢ sales tax. Service was extended to Carbondale in 1989. From 1984 to 1989, yearly ridership increased 36% from 1.4 million to 1.8 million.

Between 1990 and 1995, RFTA experienced incredible growth of 85% from 1.9 million to 3.5 million annual rides. Ridership increases were contributed to service extension to Glenwood Springs, a free downtown circulator in Glenwood Springs, frequency increases, and the introduction of paid parking in Aspen. Also during this time period, the Environmental Protection Agency designated Aspen as a PM_{10} non-attainment area, resulting in RFTA increasing services to reduce air pollution and vehicle miles traveled, particularly along the SH 82 corridor.

In 1994 the Roaring Fork Railroad Holding Authority (RFRHA) was created as a public entity to purchase the former Denver and Rio Grande Aspen Branch between Glenwood Springs and Woody Creek. The corridor was purchased in 1996 at a cost of $8.5 million. The corridor was converted to a rail trail and railbanked for a future mass transit line to reduce congestion on SH 82. In 2000, the Roaring Fork Transportation Authority was created by seven members in the Roaring Fork Valley, creating the state's first Rural Transportation Agency and taking over the responsibilities of the Roaring Fork Transit Agency. As a result of the vote, RFRHA merged with the RFTA in 2001.

In 2004 the Town of New Castle voted to become the newest member of RFTA. Rifle and Silt, west of New Castle along the I-70/US 6 corridor, are not members but still receive RFTA service on the Grand Hogback route.

Service was temporarily extended to Parachute during a 95-day replacement of the Grand Avenue bridge in Glenwood Springs from August 14 to November 22, 2017. It's estimated that the free service resulted in an additional 300,000 annual rides during 2017. The Town of Parachute began negotiations with RFTA to extend service there, but was shelved for being too expensive. In September 2020, Parachute Area Transit System (PATS) began service to Battlement Mesa and Rifle, connecting with RFTA at the latter. While RFTA does not operate the service, they assisted in developing routes, fares, and schedules.

== Fleet ==
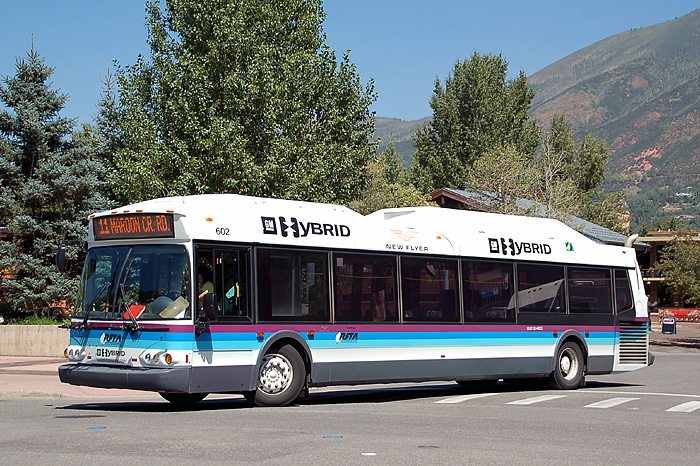
RFTA New Flyer DE40i #602, one of four hybrid Inveros in existence.

As of January 2025, RFTA operates a fleet of 106 transit buses and 10 cutaway vans, nine of which are used for paratransit service. All buses are fully accessible and use alternative fuels to enhance environmental sustainability in the Valley. All diesel buses use biodiesel and all gasoline-powered cutaway and service vehicles use ethanol. Twenty-two compressed natural gas (CNG) buses with free on-board Wi-Fi were introduced with the VelociRFTA bus rapid transit line.

On December 3, 2019, eight battery electric buses were placed into service on City of Aspen routes at the cost of $9.2 million. RFTA has developed their Zero-Emission Fleet Transition Plan to guide how the organization plans to transition to a fully Zero Emission Vehicle (ZEV) fleet. The plan aligns with RFTA’s Climate Action Plan (CAP) and the goal to reduce fossil fuels burned by RFTA by 50% by 2030 and 90% by 2050. CNG buses operate out of the Glenwood Springs Maintenance Facility and battery electric buses operate out of the Aspen Maintenance Facility.

Beginning in the late 1970s, RFTA's predecessors were one of the first transit agencies in the United States to allow buses to carry bikes using custom built bike racks. All buses are equipped with bike racks from mid-spring to late-fall. Racks on most buses are capable of hauling four bikes at a time, although racks on VelociRFTA buses are only capable of carrying two bikes. During winter ski season, the bike racks are removed and replaced with ski racks. Bikes are not allowed on buses after nightfall due to driver visibility issues.

== VelociRFTA Bus Rapid Transit (BRT) ==
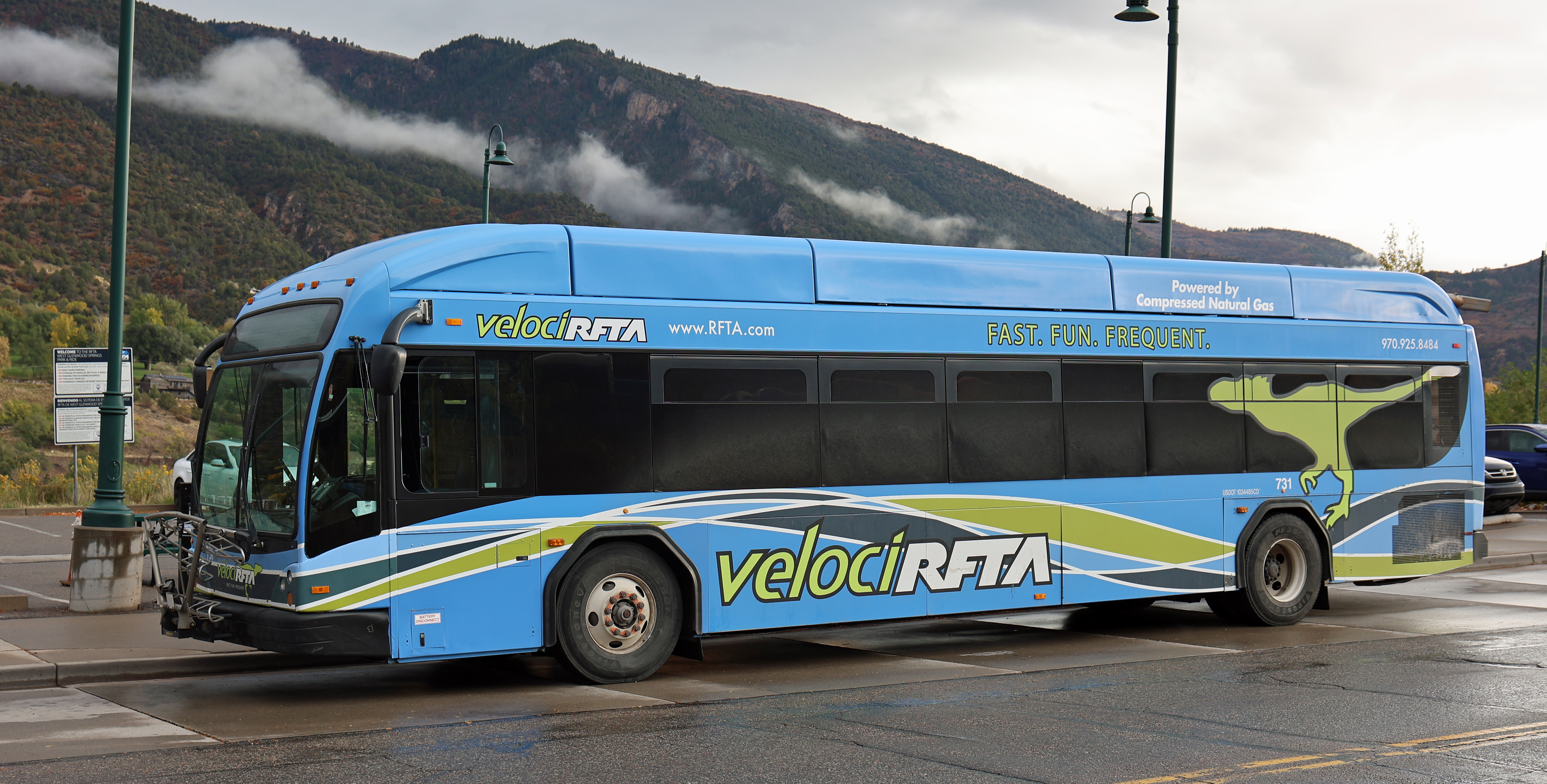
A VelociRFTA bus in 2025

RFTA's system offers express service throughout the Roaring Fork Valley from Glenwood Springs to Aspen since September 3, 2013. VelociRFTA is thought to be the first ever rural Bus Rapid Transit system in the U.S. Ridership immediately rose 27.6% year over year with the new system. These buses operate on CNG from the Glenwood Springs facility.

The name is a pun on Velociraptor and the logo is a green Velociraptor. To promote the new service, RFTA placed giant concrete dinosaur eggs at selected bus stops, and cast dinosaur footprints in nearby sidewalks.

In 2025, data submitted to the Federal Transit Administration showed VelociRFTA service provided 1,136,080 unlinked passenger trips. The service operated at an average vehicle speed of 27.0 miles per hour (43.5 kilometres per hour), versus 21.7 mph (34.9 km/h) for RFTA commuter bus service and 10.6 mph (17.1 km/h) for RFTA's transit bus service.

== Routes ==
RFTA operates "corridor" regional services on Interstate 70 and State Highway 82 that connect Glenwood Springs with cities along the respective highways. The agency also has circulator and local routes that serve Carbondale, Glenwood Springs, Woody Creek, and Snowmass Village. The City of Aspen has several local routes, including the Maroon Bells shuttle operated under a contract with the United States Forest Service. The Maroon Bells shuttle is the only RFTA route that requires reservations and uses a special fare.

== Fares ==
RFTA uses fare zones to determine fares based on the length of a trip. Ticket vending machines are available at 9 bus rapid transit stations Stored value cards, seasonal and 30 day zone passes are available from ticket vending machines at all 9 VelociRFTA stations and select retail outlets and offer a 25% discount. RFTA Mobile Tickets was introduced in 2022 and lets riders buy tickets and passes anytime from anywhere on their smartphones. Riders save 25% every time they purchase a single one-way trip or round-trip ticket across all RFTA regional routes when using the RFTA Tickets mobile app. Discount fares are also available for veterans and persons with disabilities. Children under 5 and seniors 65 and over ride for free.

Service is free when riding within each fare zone, and between Aspen, Snowmass Village, and Woody Creek.

== See also ==
- List of bus transit systems in the United States
- List of bus rapid transit systems in the Americas
