= Cattle Creek (Roaring Fork River tributary) =

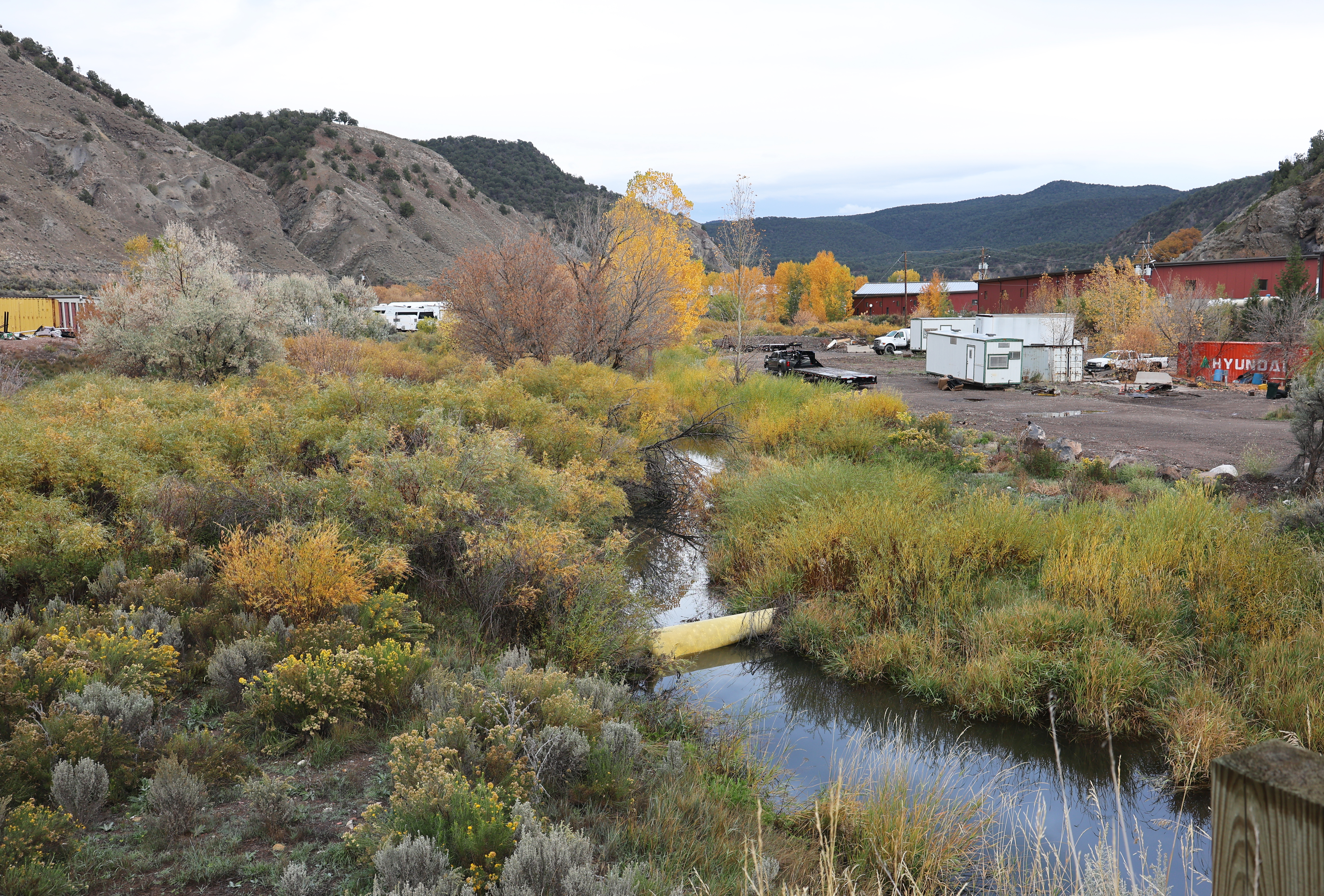
- The creek as it meanders through the community of Cattle Creek before it passes under Highway 82 to its confluence with the Roaring Fork River

- The location of the creek's mouth in Colorado

Physical characteristics
- Source
  - location: White River National Forest, northeast of Basalt Mountain
  - coordinates: 39°27′12.94″N 106°55′12.15″W
- Mouth
  - location: Cattle Creek, Colorado
  - coordinates: 39°27′45.94″N 107°16′15.19″W
  - elevation: 5,932 feet (1,808 meters)

Basin features
- Progression: Roaring Fork → Colorado
- Tributaries
  - left: Mill Creek
  - right: Swamp Creek; Lola Creek; Yoeman Creek; Thompson Creek; North Fork Cattle Creek; Sleppy Creek; Coulter Creek; Fisher Creek

Cattle Creek is a tributary of the Roaring Fork River in Garfield County, Colorado.

== Course ==
The creek rises northeast of Basalt Mountain in the White River National Forest. From there, it travels generally west, losing some of its flow through ditch diversions, then eventually passing through the community of Cattle Creek, which is named for the creek. From there, the stream continues east, passing under State Highway 82 to its confluence with the Roaring Fork River.

== See also ==
- List of rivers of Colorado
