= Colorado Rocky Mountain School =

Private school in Carbondale, Colorado, United States

Location
- 500 Holden Way; Carbondale, Colorado 81623; United States; 39°24′30″N 107°13′44″W

Information
- Type: Private, co-ed
- Established: 1953 (73 years ago)
- CEEB code: 060215
- Head of school: Jeff Leahy
- Faculty: ~40
- Average class size: 11 students
- Campus size: 320 acres (1.3 km^{2})
- Campus type: Ranch
- Colors: Green and white
- Mascot: Rocky Mountain Oysters
- Affiliation: None
- Boarding/day student ratio: 60% boarding to 40% day
- Website: www.crms.org

Colorado Rocky Mountain School (CRMS) is an independent coeducational boarding and day school in unincorporated Garfield County, Colorado, United States, with a Carbondale post office address. Founded in 1953, CRMS educates roughly 175 students in grades 9 through 12. The curriculum emphasizes rigorous college preparatory academics, exposure to visual and performing arts, educational experience in the wilderness, campus service crews, and required athletics. In 2020, school review website Niche ranked Colorado Rocky Mountain school as one of Colorado's best boarding schools and best high schools for the arts.

== History ==
Colorado Rocky Mountain School was founded in 1953 by John and Anne Holden, former faculty at the Putney School in Vermont. The school was envisioned as an expansion on the educational ideas of Carmelita Hinton at Putney. In addition to Hinton, the Holdens drew strongly upon the ideas of Kurt Hahn and John Dewey. The school's location in western Colorado facilitated experimentation as well as necessitating practical adaptation of the ideas of its eastern U.S and European-based influences.

The Holdens were able to buy a small piece of land and the school began in a ranch house on the property originally called the Big House (now renamed Holden House). Quickly encountering building space limitations, the Holdens, along with early students and faculty members, built or renovated much of the classroom and dormitory space themselves in the school's founding years.

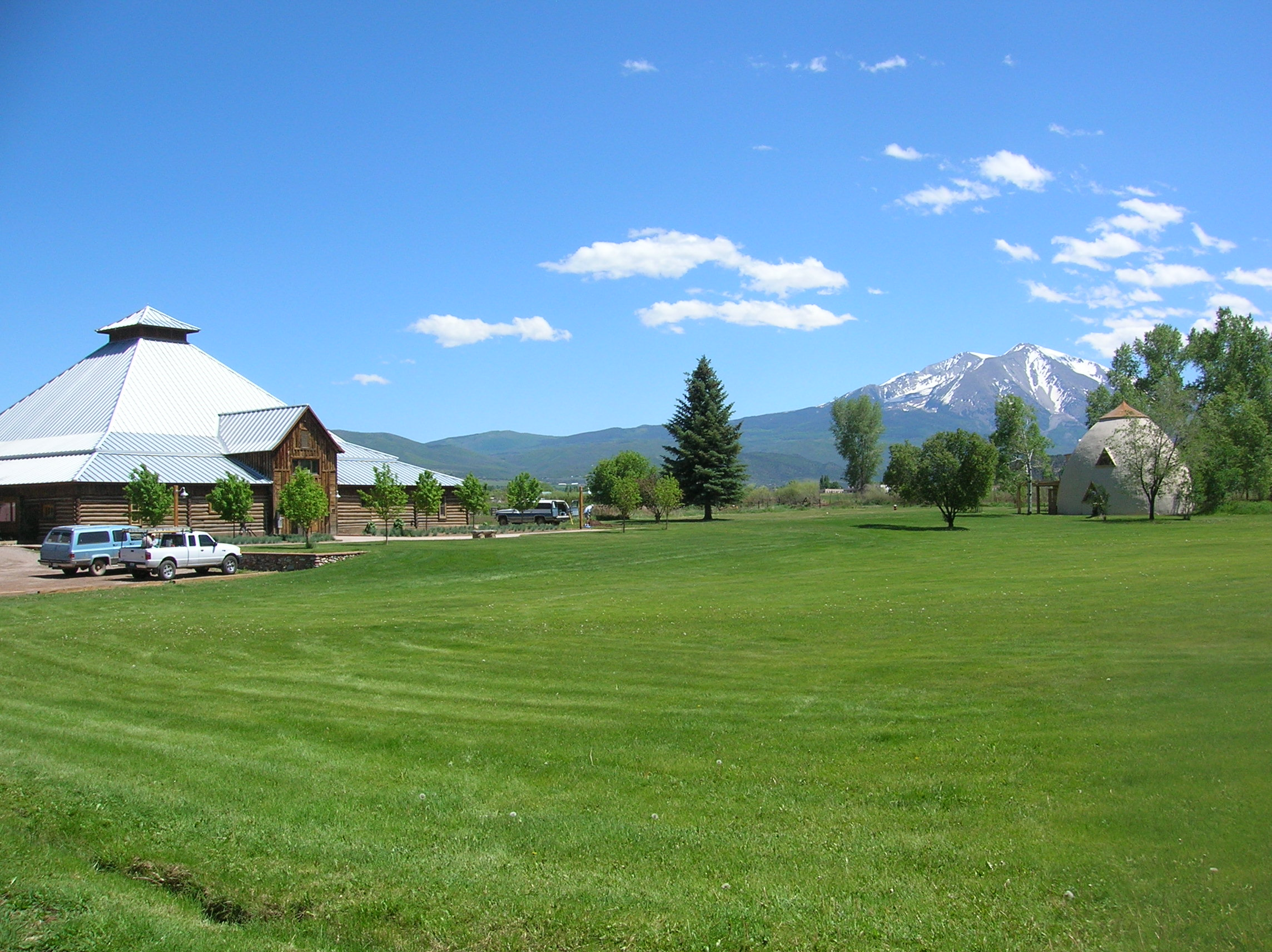
Graduation occurs each June on this lawn in front of the Barn and the Adobe.

The Pabst family donated the neighboring Bar Fork Ranch to the school. A landmark on the ranch was a large, one-hundred foot square hay barn built in 1897. Today the barn serves as a hub of campus, hosting all-school meeting, theater productions, student music performances, and events for the larger town community. The library, music classrooms, and the main computer lab are also housed in the building. The barn, along with Mt. Sopris, a mountain to the south of Carbondale, serves as a symbol of the school, incorporated in its logo.

In its early years, the school found modest success, and initiated some programs outside of the academic curriculum. Among these were seasonal trips into the nearby mountains and desert lands, a kayaking program, athletic programs in downhill and cross-country ski racing, and campus work crews. In late 2005, the board of trustees selected English faculty member and Dean of Students Jeff Leahy as the school's new Headmaster.

== Athletics ==
CRMS offers kayaking, cross-country and downhill skiing, telemark skiing, mountain biking, and rock climbing. The school also has programs in snowboarding, canoeing, tennis, cross-country running, soccer, and hiking.

== Notable alumni ==
- Conrad Anker, rock climber, mountaineer and author
- Tamim Ansary, author
- Akira Back, chef and restaurateur
- Hayden Kennedy, rock climber and mountaineer
- Oliver Platt, actor
- Ruth Rogers, chef, restaurateur, and author
- Josh Thompson, biathlete, Winter Olympian, silver medalist at the 1987 Biathlon World Championships
