= Basalt, Colorado =

Town in Colorado, US

Basalt, Colorado Aspen Junction, incorporated in 1901 as Basalt
- Home rule town
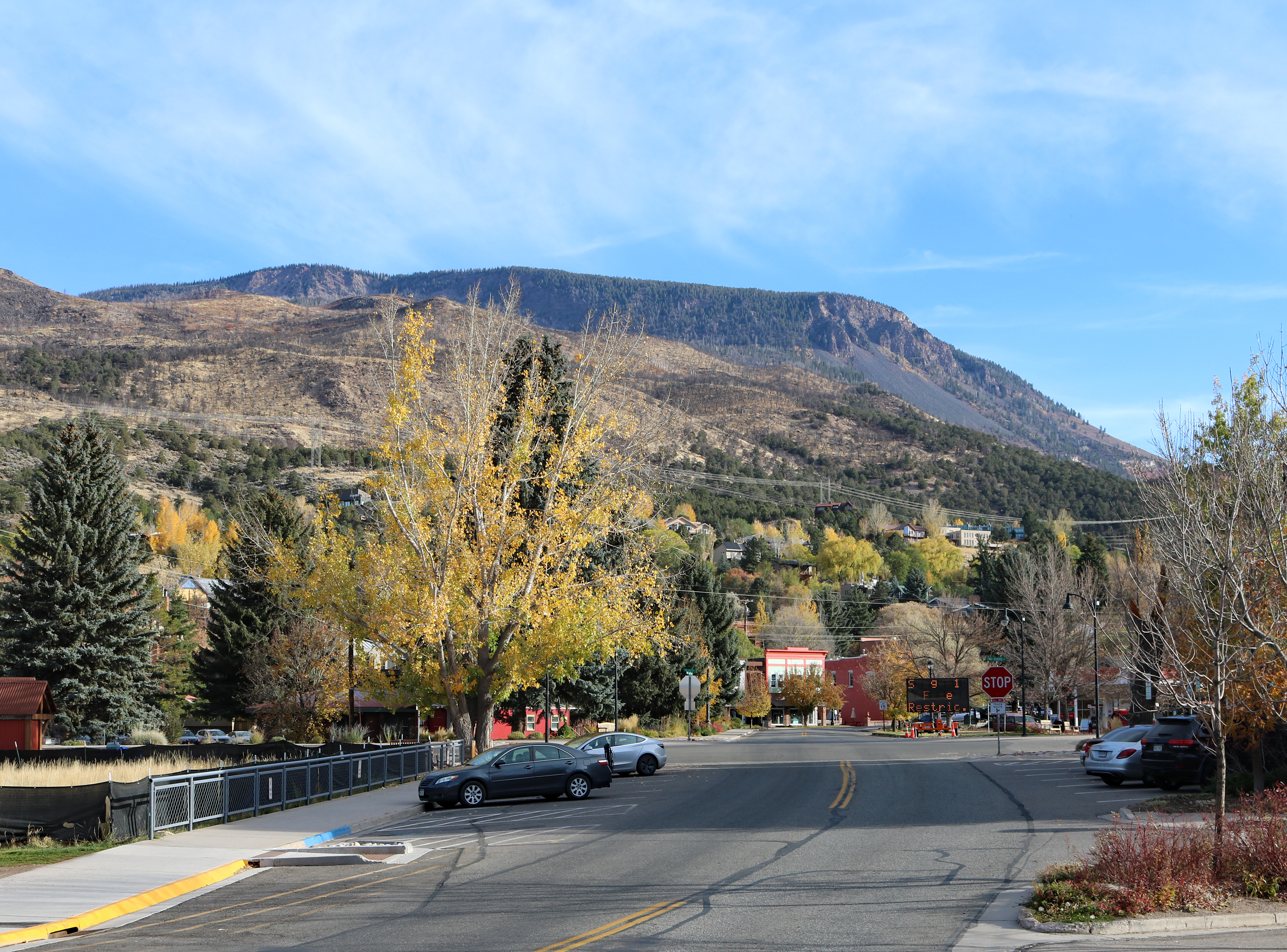
- Downtown Basalt with Basalt Mountain in the background
- Nickname: "The Heart of the Roaring Fork Valley"
- Location of the Town of Basalt in Eagle and Pitkin counties, Colorado
- Coordinates: 39°22′24″N 107°02′27″W
- Country: United States
- State: Colorado
- Counties: Eagle, Pitkin
- Incorporated: August 26, 1901

Government
  - Type: Home rule town

Area
  - Total: 1.999 sq mi (5.178 km^{2})
  - Land: 1.992 sq mi (5.158 km^{2})
  - Water: 0.0077 sq mi (0.020 km^{2})
- Elevation: 6,611 ft (2,015 m)

Population (2020)
  - Total: 3,984
  - Density: 2,000/sq mi (770/km^{2})
- Time zone: UTC−07:00 (MST)
  - Summer (DST): UTC−06:00 (MDT)
- ZIP code: 81621
- Area code: 970
- GNIS town ID: 2411665
- FIPS code: 08-04935
- Website: Town of Basalt

Basalt is a home rule town located in Eagle and Pitkin counties, Colorado, United States. The town population was 3,984 at the 2020 United States census with 2,917 residing in Eagle County and 1,067 residing in Pitkin County. Basalt is a part of the Edwards-Glenwood Springs, CO Combined Statistical Area.

== History ==
Basalt was first named Aspen Junction after the railroad junction which led to present day Aspen, Colorado. Aspen Junction was a territory serving Aspen to Leadville Mining towns, with the Railroad Junction, also going West and South to Carbondale and Glenwood Springs. The Aspen Junction, Colorado, post office opened on February 13, 1890. The town was first served by the Colorado Midland Railroad, but the railroad was later bought by the Denver & Rio Grande Railroad in 1901.

The Aspen Junction post office was renamed Basalt on June 19, 1895, and the Town of Basalt was incorporated on August 26, 1901. The name was chosen for the basaltic rock formations on Basalt Mountain.

== Geography ==
Basalt is located along State Highway 82, and at the confluence of the Fryingpan and Roaring Fork rivers.

At the 2020 United States census, the town had a total area of 1,280 acres (5.178 km^{2}) including 4.9 acres (0.020 km^{2}) of water.

== Demographics ==
Historical population
Census	Pop.	Note	%±
1900	382		—
1910	235		−38.5%
1920	185		−21.3%
1930	148		−20.0%
1940	212		43.2%
1950	173		−18.4%
1960	213		23.1%
1970	419		96.7%
1980	529		26.3%
1990	1,128		113.2%
2000	2,681		137.7%
2010	3,857		43.9%
2020	3,984		3.3%
U.S. Decennial Census

=== 2020 census ===
As of the 2020 census, Basalt had a population of 3,984. The median age was 40.6 years. 19.0% of residents were under the age of 18 and 15.6% of residents were 65 years of age or older. For every 100 females there were 98.4 males, and for every 100 females age 18 and over there were 97.6 males age 18 and over.

98.3% of residents lived in urban areas, while 1.7% lived in rural areas.

There were 1,758 households in Basalt, of which 27.7% had children under the age of 18 living in them. Of all households, 44.5% were married-couple households, 21.2% were households with a male householder and no spouse or partner present, and 26.6% were households with a female householder and no spouse or partner present. About 29.1% of all households were made up of individuals and 8.4% had someone living alone who was 65 years of age or older.

There were 2,060 housing units, of which 14.7% were vacant. The homeowner vacancy rate was 1.7% and the rental vacancy rate was 6.3%.

Racial composition as of the 2020 census
Race	Number	Percent
White	3,212	80.6%
Black or African American	21	0.5%
American Indian and Alaska Native	17	0.4%
Asian	64	1.6%
Native Hawaiian and Other Pacific Islander	2	0.1%
Some other race	253	6.4%
Two or more races	415	10.4%
Hispanic or Latino (of any race)	662	16.6%

=== 2000 census ===
As of the 2000 census, there were 2,681 people, 1,052 households, and 637 families residing in the town. The population density was 1,394.8 inhabitants per square mile (538.5/km^{2}). There were 1,218 housing units at an average density of 633.7 per square mile (244.7/km^{2}). The racial makeup of the town was 91.53% White, 0.48% African American, 0.52% Native American, 1.27% Asian, 0.11% Pacific Islander, 4.77% from other races, and 1.31% from two or more races. Hispanic or Latino of any race were 11.75% of the population.

There were 1,052 households, out of which 34.0% had children under the age of 18 living with them, 50.1% were married couples living together, 7.4% had a female householder with no husband present, and 39.4% were non-families. 24.0% of all households were made up of individuals, and 2.0% had someone living alone who was 65 years of age or older. The average household size was 2.55 and the average family size was 3.00.

In the town, the population was spread out, with 23.6% under the age of 18, 6.8% from 18 to 24, 42.3% from 25 to 44, 24.4% from 45 to 64, and 3.0% who were 65 years of age or older. The median age was 34 years. For every 100 females, there were 108.8 males. For every 100 females age 18 and over, there were 110.6 males.

The median income for a household in the town was $67,200, and the median income for a family was $73,375. Males had a median income of $40,791 versus $30,532 for females. The per capita income for the town was $30,746. About 4.9% of families and 6.3% of the population were below the poverty line, including 5.9% of those under age 18 and 6.8% of those age 65 or over.

== Tourism ==
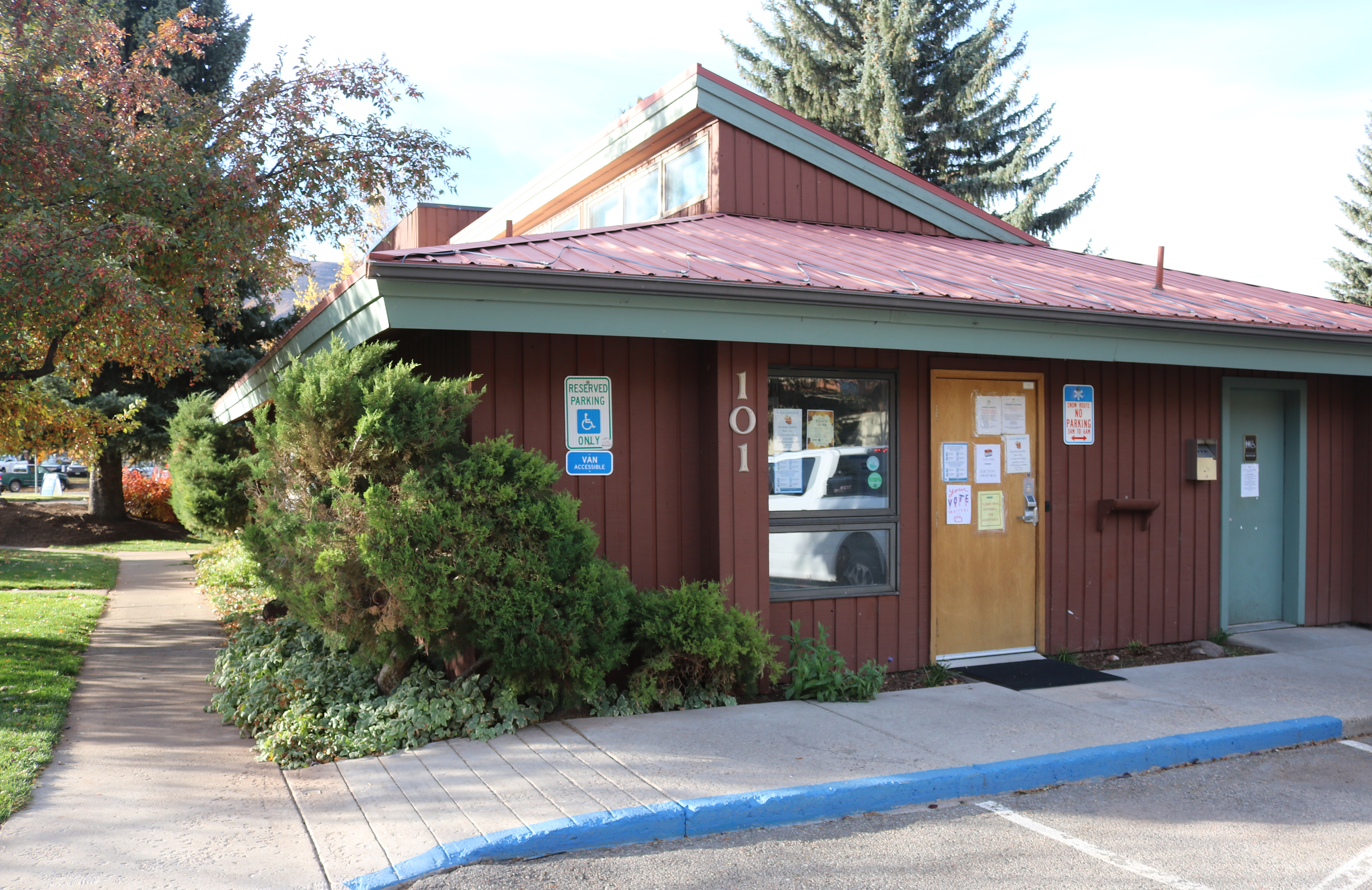
Basalt Town Hall

Basalt is well known for its Gold Medal trout fishing in the Frying Pan River. Ruedi Reservoir is also a popular regional destination for boating and other watersports. Basalt is a hub for mountain biking in the Roaring Fork valley. There are a dozen world class cross country trails as well as lift-accessed downhilling within 15 miles of Basalt, both up and down the valley.

== Transportation ==
- Roaring Fork Transportation Authority (RFTA) provides bus transit in Basalt.
- Basalt's public transit system (WE-CYCLE) supplied by PBSC.

== Education ==
It is in the Roaring Fork School District RE-1.

== Notable people ==
- Wally Dallenbach Jr., NASCAR driver
- Neil Diamond, musician
- Joey Diaz, comedian
- Hanna Faulhaber, freestyle skier and Olympian
- Ann Korologos, former United States Secretary of Labor
- Tom Korologos, former United States Ambassador to Belgium
- Christy Smith, contestant on Survivor: The Amazon
- Torin Yater-Wallace, Olympian freestyle skier

== See also ==
- Edwards-Rifle, CO Combined Statistical Area
