= Carbondale, Colorado =

Town in Colorado, US

- Home rule town
- Town of Carbondale
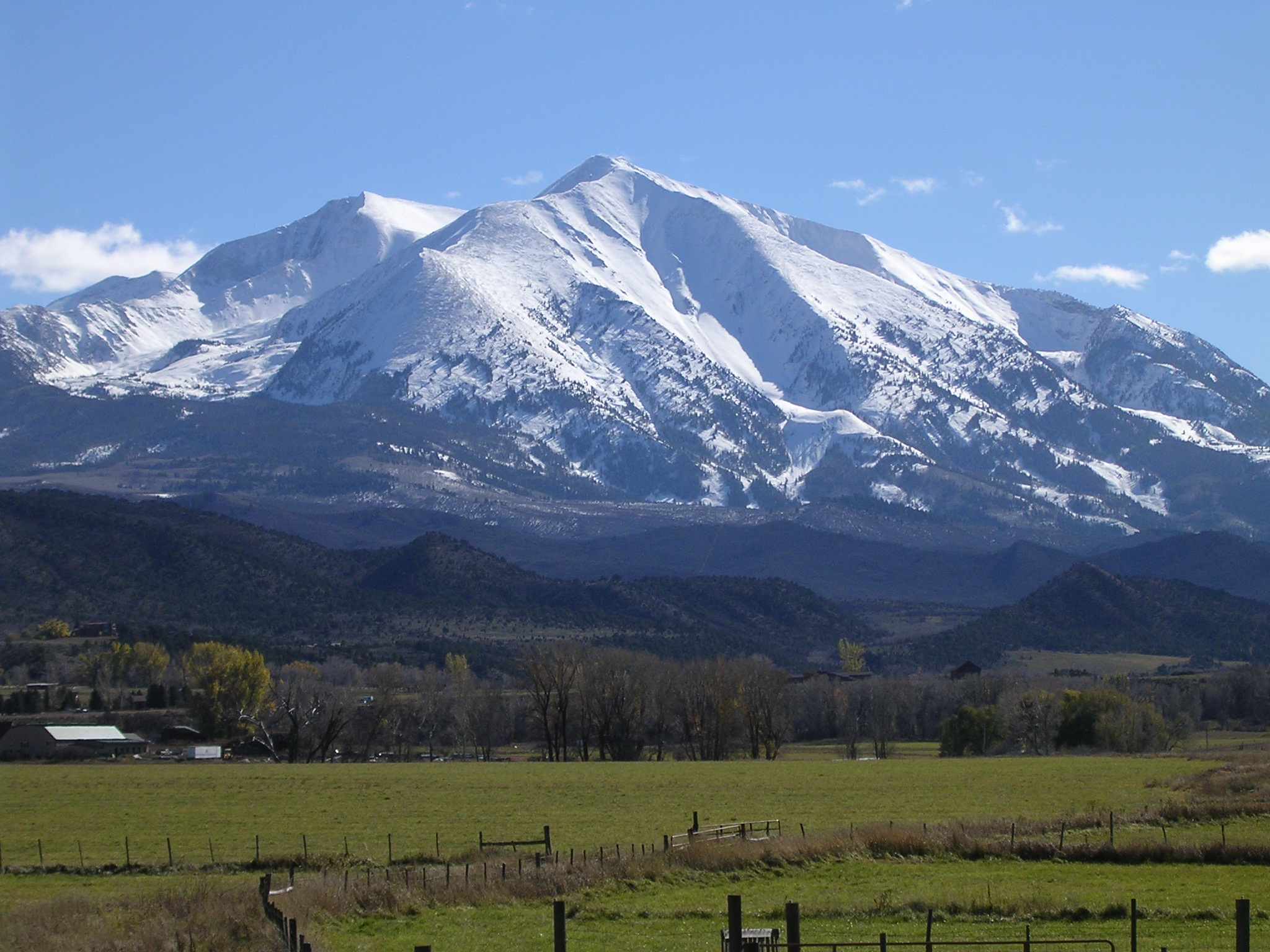
- Mount Sopris, south of the town, looms close by.
- Nickname: The Ultimate Rocky Mountain Hideout
- Location of the Town of Carbondale in Garfield County, Colorado
- Coordinates: 39°22′50″N 107°12′51″W
- Country: United States
- State: Colorado
- County: Garfield
- Incorporated (town): April 26, 1888

Government
  - Type: home rule city

Area
  - Total: 2.022 sq mi (5.237 km^{2})
  - Land: 2.022 sq mi (5.237 km^{2})
  - Water: 0 sq mi (0.000 km^{2})
- Elevation: 6,172 ft (1,881 m)

Population (2020)
  - Total: 6,434
  - Density: 3,182/sq mi (1,229/km^{2})
- Time zone: UTC−07:00 (MST)
  - Summer (DST): UTC−06:00 (MDT)
- ZIP code: 81623
- Area codes: 970/748
- GNIS town ID: 2413166
- FIPS code: 08-12045
- Website: carbondalegov.org

The Town of Carbondale is a home rule municipality located in Garfield County, Colorado, United States. The town population was 6,434 at the 2020 United States census. Carbondale is a part of the Rifle, CO Micropolitan Statistical Area.

The town is located in the Roaring Fork Valley, downstream from Aspen and upstream from the mouth of the Roaring Fork River at Glenwood Springs. The town proper sits on the south bank of the river, near its confluence with the Crystal River. Carbondale's horizon is dominated by the 12,953 ft (3,952 m) tall Mount Sopris several miles to the south of town. Carbondale is the northern terminus of the West Elk Loop Scenic and Historic Byway.

== History and culture ==
The Roaring Fork and Crystal Valleys historically were a seasonal home and hunting ground of the Parianuche and Yampa bands of the Ute people. In the 1870s, white prospectors and settlers defied U.S. treaties with the Utes and entered the area in increasingly significant numbers. The United States Agreement with the Confederated Bands of Ute signed on September 18, 1880, removed the Ute People from the area.

The State of Colorado created Garfield County on February 10, 1883, and the Carbondale, Colorado, post office opened on January 6, 1887.

Carbondale takes its name from Carbondale, Pennsylvania, hometown of some of Carbondale's early settlers. Carbondale's economy was initially agriculturally based. Farmers and ranchers capitalized on open lands around Carbondale to supply food for miners in nearby Aspen, then a booming center of silver mining activity.

Early in the 20th century, before the rise of industrial agriculture in Idaho, Carbondale's primary agricultural product was potatoes. The legacy lives on in Potato Day, an annual fall parade and cookout in Sopris Park.

Despite the non-geologic origins of the town's name, the Carbondale area does in fact possess significant coal resources. Until the late 1980s Carbondale's economy was primarily based on coal operations up the Crystal River Valley. The coal mined from the area was favored for its high burning temperature, low sulfur content, and density. However, the coal deposits also contained significant amounts of methane gas. In 1981, a methane gas explosion killed 15 miners and by 1991 the mines closed down permanently.

The rise of Aspen as a skiing mecca and subsequent hyperinflation of its real estate prices has forced a majority of its workers to other towns like Carbondale. Thus, especially since the 1980s, Carbondale has partly served as a bedroom community to Aspen, and, to a lesser extent, Glenwood Springs. More recently Carbondale has seen a boom of second-home construction, arts and recreational amenities, and tourism as the area's wealth and renown has grown.

=== Notable community organizations and events ===
Carbondale's largest annual event is the summer arts and music festival, Mountain Fair held in Sopris Park. The event has annual attendance between 18,000 and 20,000 people over the three days of which it is held, being nearly triple the population of Carbondale. It is run by and benefits Carbondale Arts, a nonprofit that runs a range of other arts programs year-round.

The popular Carbondale Wild West Rodeo is held every Thursday night during the summer and features bronc riding, calf scramble, hide racing, and ribbon roping among other competitions.

KDNK is a community access FM radio station licensed to Carbondale.

The Third Street Center is a local nonprofit hub in the town's former elementary school that hosts many community organizations.

The Carbondale Clay Center, Carbondale Arts' R2 Gallery, and The Powers Art Center offer rotating public art exhibitions.

The Carbondale Creative District is certified by a grant, marketing, and technical assistance program run by Colorado Creative Industries, a division of the state Office of Economic Development and International Trade.

== Geography ==
At the 2020 United States census, the town had a total area of 1,294 acres (5.237 km^{2}), all of it land.

== Demographics ==
Historical population
Census	Pop.	Note	%±
1890	166		—
1900	173		4.2%
1910	284		64.2%
1920	310		9.2%
1930	283		−8.7%
1940	437		54.4%
1950	441		0.9%
1960	612		38.8%
1970	726		18.6%
1980	2,084		187.1%
1990	3,004		44.1%
2000	5,196		73.0%
2010	6,427		23.7%
2020	6,434		0.1%
U.S. Decennial Census

=== 2020 census ===
As of the 2020 census, Carbondale had a population of 6,434. The median age was 37.6 years. 22.5% of residents were under the age of 18 and 14.9% of residents were 65 years of age or older. For every 100 females there were 98.6 males, and for every 100 females age 18 and over there were 100.0 males age 18 and over.

99.8% of residents lived in urban areas, while 0.2% lived in rural areas.

There were 2,416 households in Carbondale, of which 33.4% had children under the age of 18 living in them. Of all households, 47.0% were married-couple households, 19.0% were households with a male householder and no spouse or partner present, and 24.8% were households with a female householder and no spouse or partner present. About 24.5% of all households were made up of individuals and 10.6% had someone living alone who was 65 years of age or older.

There were 2,583 housing units, of which 6.5% were vacant. The homeowner vacancy rate was 0.9% and the rental vacancy rate was 3.2%.

Racial composition as of the 2020 census
Race	Number	Percent
White	4,391	68.2%
Black or African American	31	0.5%
American Indian and Alaska Native	85	1.3%
Asian	65	1.0%
Native Hawaiian and Other Pacific Islander	3	0.0%
Some other race	1,125	17.5%
Two or more races	734	11.4%
Hispanic or Latino (of any race)	1,965	30.5%

=== 2000 census ===
As of the census of 2000, there were 5,196 people, 1,744 households, and 1,168 families residing in the town. The population density was 2,583.8 inhabitants per square mile (997.6/km^{2}). There were 1,821 housing units at an average density of 905.5 per square mile (349.6/km^{2}). The racial makeup of the town was 84.28% White, 0.65% African American, 0.54% Native American, 0.69% Asian, 0.02% Pacific Islander, 11.80% from other races, and 2.02% from two or more races. Hispanic or Latino of any race were 32.12% of the population.

There were 1,744 households, out of which 41.1% had children under the age of 18 living with them, 51.8% were married couples living together, 10.5% had a female householder with no husband present, and 33.0% were non-families. 20.3% of all households were made up of individuals, and 3.4% had someone living alone who was 65 years of age or older. The average household size was 2.89 and the average family size was 3.32.

In the town, the population was spread out, with 26.1% under the age of 18, 11.7% from 18 to 24, 37.4% from 25 to 44, 18.7% from 45 to 64, and 6.0% who were 65 years of age or older. The median age was 31 years. For every 100 females, there were 110.1 males. For every 100 females age 18 and over, there were 107.7 males.

The median income for a household in the town was $52,429, and the median income for a family was $55,726. Males had a median income of $33,025 versus $24,786 for females. The per capita income for the town was $20,383. About 9.8% of families and 12.2% of the population were below the poverty line, including 13.0% of those under age 18 and 5.0% of those age 65 or over.

== Education ==
Carbondale is within the Roaring Fork School District RE-1.

District-operated public schools

- Crystal River Elementary School
- Carbondale Middle School
- Roaring Fork High School (RFHS)
- Bridges High School (BHS) (alternative school)

Charter schools

- Carbondale Community School
- Ross Montessori School

Private schools

- Colorado Rocky Mountain School (CRMS) (outside of the city limits)
- Waldorf School on the Roaring Fork

=== Higher Education ===
Colorado Mountain College operates a campus in Carbondale. CMC’s Spring Valley at Glenwood Springs residential campus is also located near Carbondale, just north of the town along Highway 82.

== Transportation ==
Roaring Fork Transportation Authority provides bus transit service in Carbondale.

== See also ==
- Edwards-Rifle, CO Combined Statistical Area
