= Bank of California =

Former American bank

The Bank of California was opened in San Francisco, California, on July 4, 1864, by William Chapman Ralston and Darius Ogden Mills. It was the first commercial bank in the Western United States, and considered instrumental in developing the American Old West.

== History ==
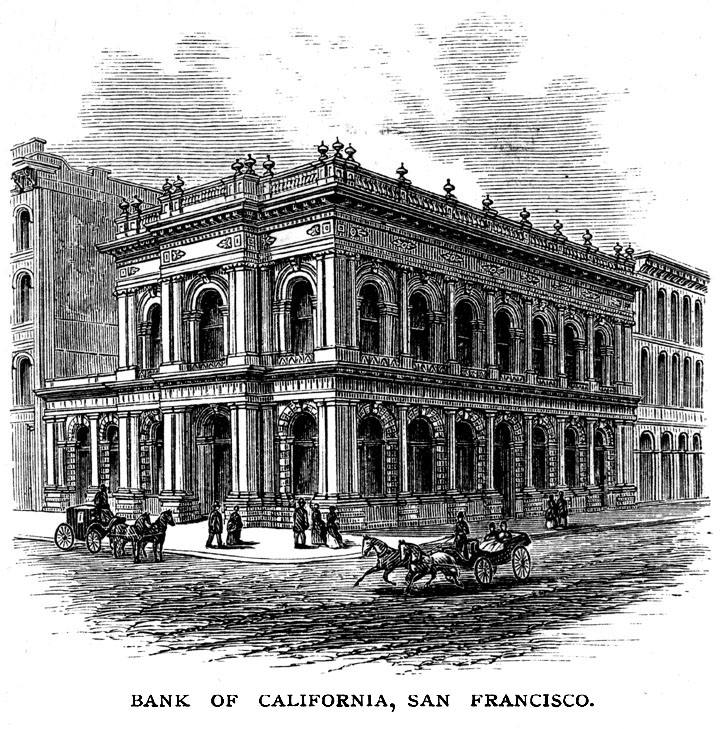
The Bank of California in 1875

The ancestor of the bank was the banking firm of Garrison, Morgan, Fretz & Ralston, established in San Francisco in January 1856 by a group that included Ralston, Cornelius K. Garrison and R.S. Fretz. Ralston established the Bank of California in 1864 when he sold shares to 22 of the state's leading businessmen for $100 a share. The bank opened on July 4, 1864, with Darius Ogden Mills as president and Ralston as cashier; Louis McLane was on the board of directors. A branch was opened in Gold Hill, Nevada, near Virginia City, on September 4, 1864. William Sharon was the bank's longtime Nevada agent.

Built of stone quarried on nearby Angel Island in San Francisco Bay, the Bank of California Building at the northwest corner of California and Sansome streets in San Francisco was said to be "one of the handsomest structures on the coast…"

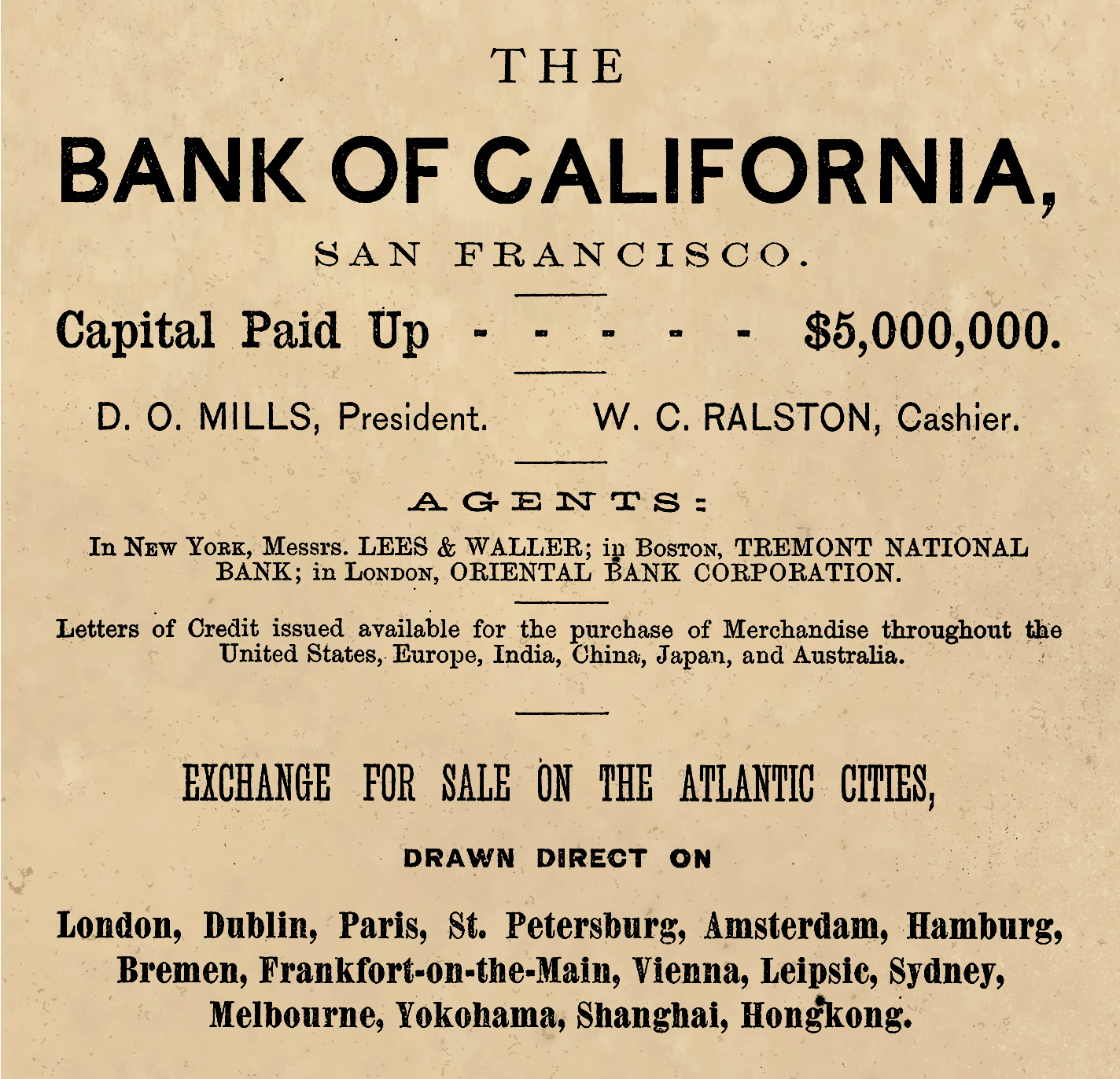
Bank of California ad, 1870

The Bank of California financed a number of mining operations of the Comstock Lode, and repossessed some mines when their owners defaulted, and ultimately generated enormous profits as a result. However, Ralston sometimes lent money to mine owners in circumstances that would inevitably lead to default and repossession. At the height of their power, Ralston and his "Ring" (as his associates were known) were able to exert monopolistic influence over sections of commerce and industry in San Francisco and in Virginia City.

In July 1869, Ralston averted a run on the bank by exchanging nearly $1 million worth of gold bars for an equivalent value in gold coin from the United States Sub-Treasury in San Francisco. The transfer was carried out in the middle of the night by two of Ralston's associates, Asbury Harpending and Maurice Dore. When the bank opened in the morning, the sight of tray after tray of gold coin at the tellers' windows quashed any thought by depositors of mounting a run on the bank.

Mills retired as president of the Bank of California in October 1873 and was succeeded by Ralston, who kept Mills on the board of directors for the prestige of his name.

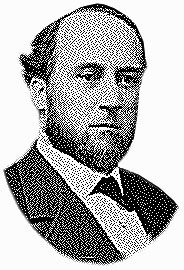
William C. Ralston

At a time of volatile trading of Nevada mining stocks, a run on the Bank of California occurred on Thursday, August 26, 1875. The bank failed, and Ralston was ruined. The next morning, he executed a deed of trust, turning over everything he owned to Sharon, and the deed was notarized. Ralston then admitted irregularities in banking practices to the board of directors, and was ousted as president. He walked to the North Beach to get away from the angry crowds and went to the Neptune Bath House, where he was accustomed to swim in the ocean on summer days. He swam out as far as he could go, and did not return. When his body was recovered, it was found he had died of a stroke.

The bank reopened on October 2, 1875, with $2 million in gold coin on hand and Mills again president. When the San Francisco clearing house was established in 1876, the city's leading banks, in order of importance, were the Bank of California, the Nevada Bank (opened in 1875 with McLane as president), J. & W. Seligman & Co. forerunners of the Anglo-California Bank, Ltd., and Wells Fargo & Company. During the economic slump of 1878, the bank's capital was reduced by $2 million.

Upon the retirement of Mills in 1878, William Alvord, a prominent merchant, was elected president of the bank. Under his leadership, the Bank of California became one of the chief centers of exchange between European money markets and those of Japan and China.

It was Alvord who, in 1887, warned James C. Flood of signs of irregularities at the Nevada Bank, enabling Flood to avert the collapse of the Nevada Bank following the speculation of its cashier in the wheat market.

Alvord was president of the Bank of California until his death in San Francisco on December 21, 1904. In January 1905, Homer S. King left Wells Fargo & Company to assume the presidency of the Bank of California. In 1910, the Bank of California incorporated the San Francisco National Bank, the successor to the bank founded by Peder Sather.

=== Merger with Union Bank ===
On April 1, 1996, the bank merged with Union Bank to form Union Bank of California, becoming the fourth largest commercial bank in California.

In 2008, it became a wholly owned subsidiary of the Japanese Mitsubishi UFJ Financial Group, and was renamed MUFG Union Bank. At the time, Union Bank of California was one of the 25 largest banks in the United States.

== Branch buildings ==
Former branches of the Bank of California

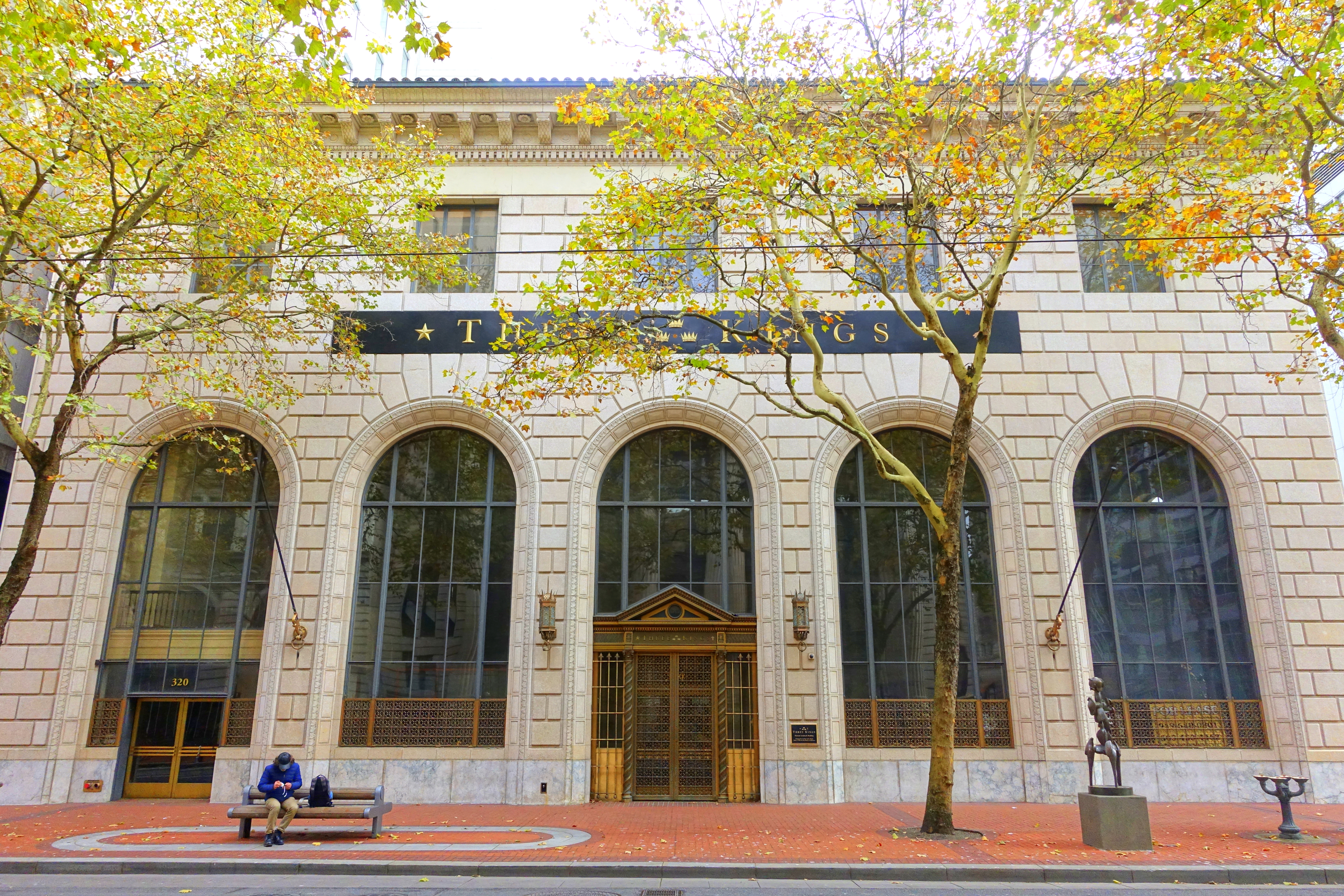
Bank of California Building (Portland)

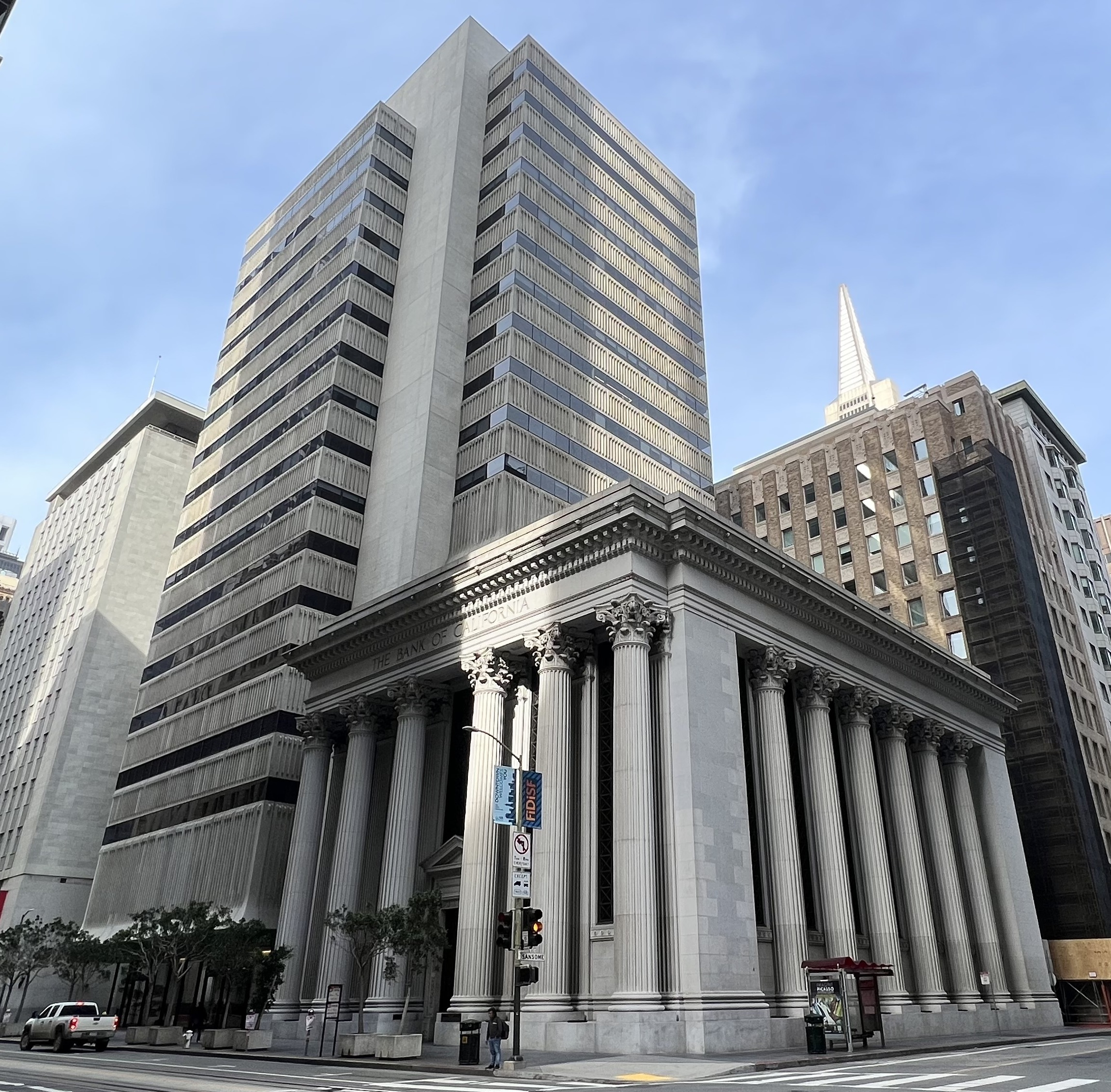
Bank of California Building (San Francisco)

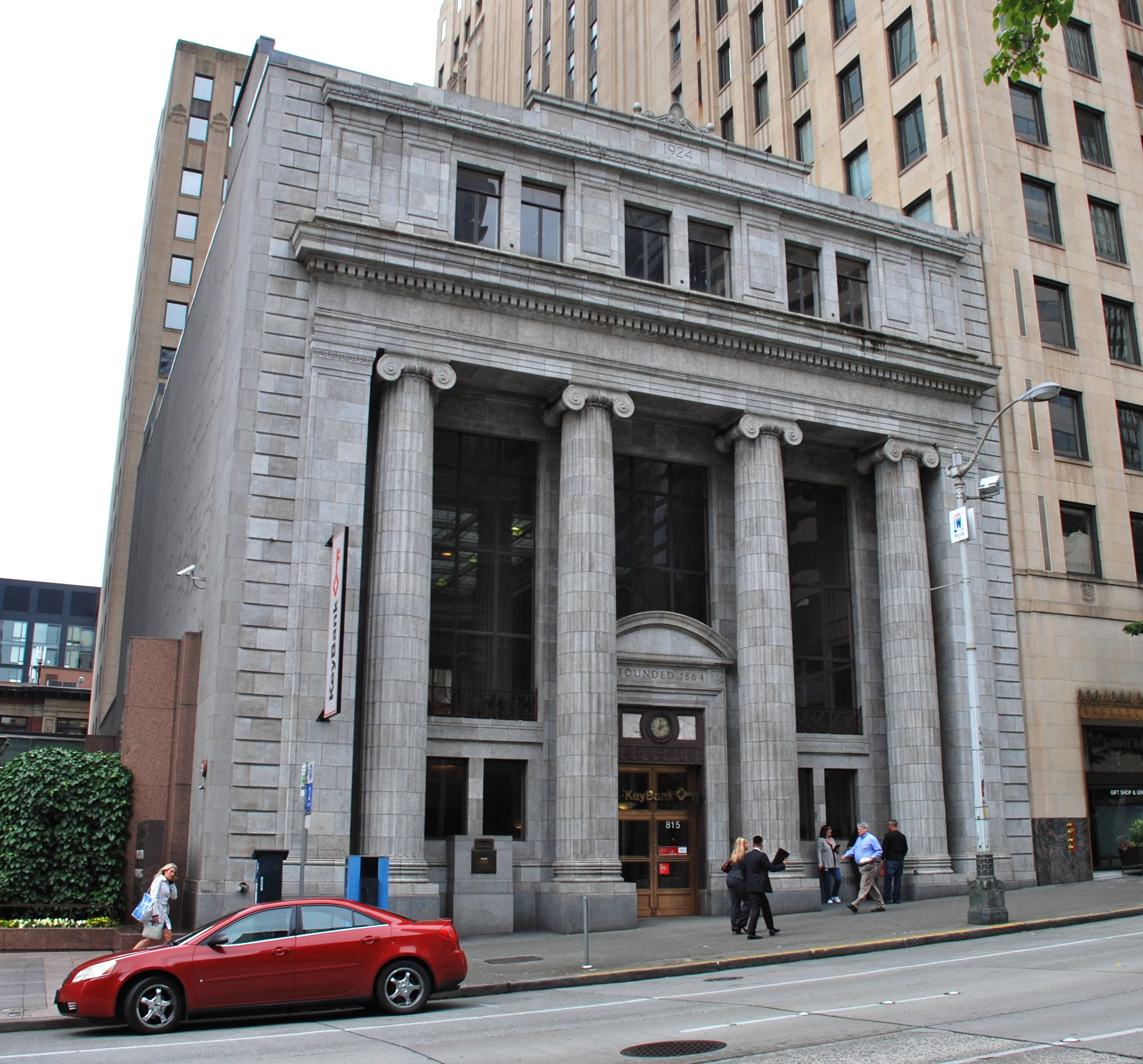
Bank of California Building (Seattle)

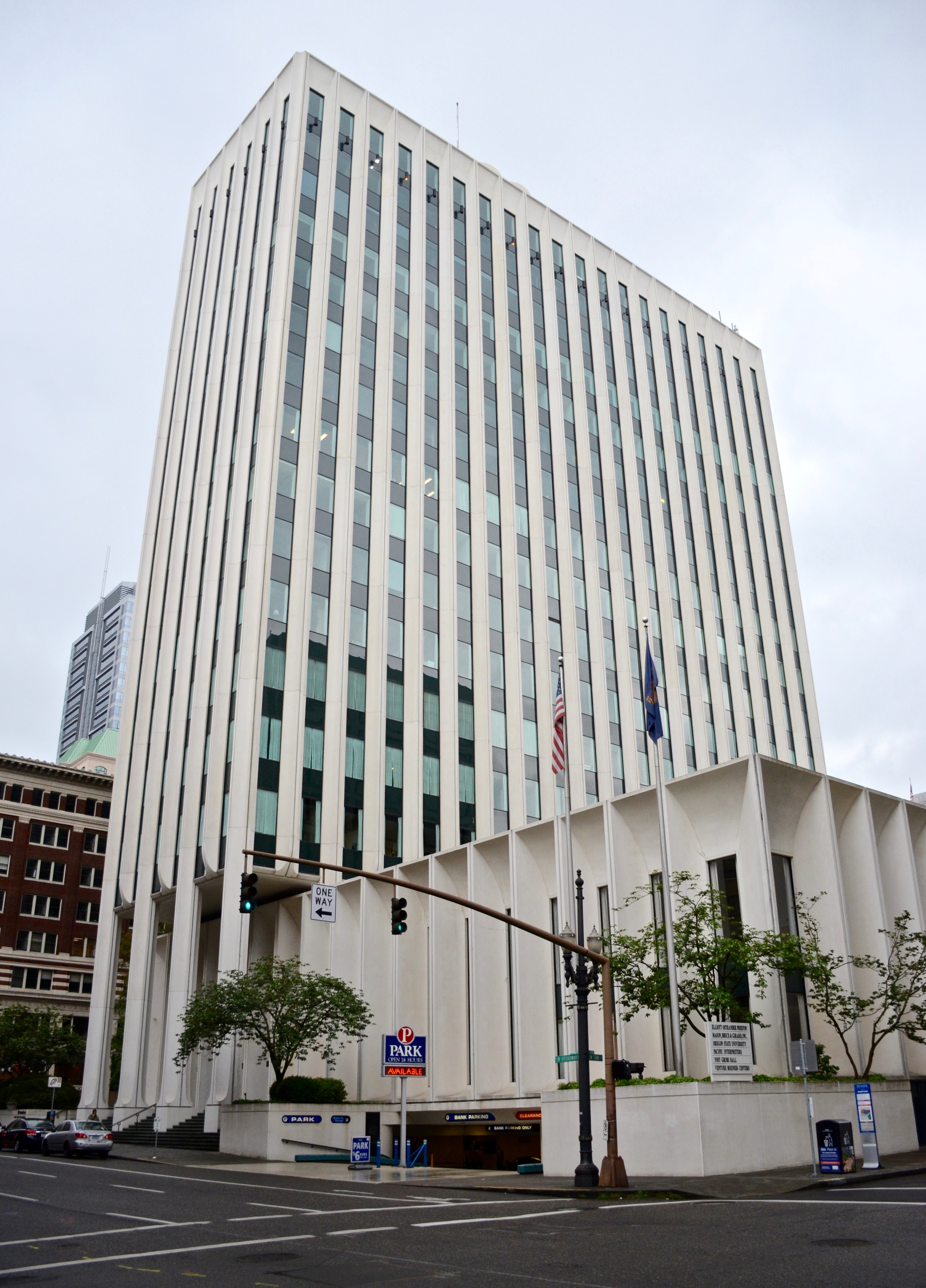
Bank of California Tower (Portland)

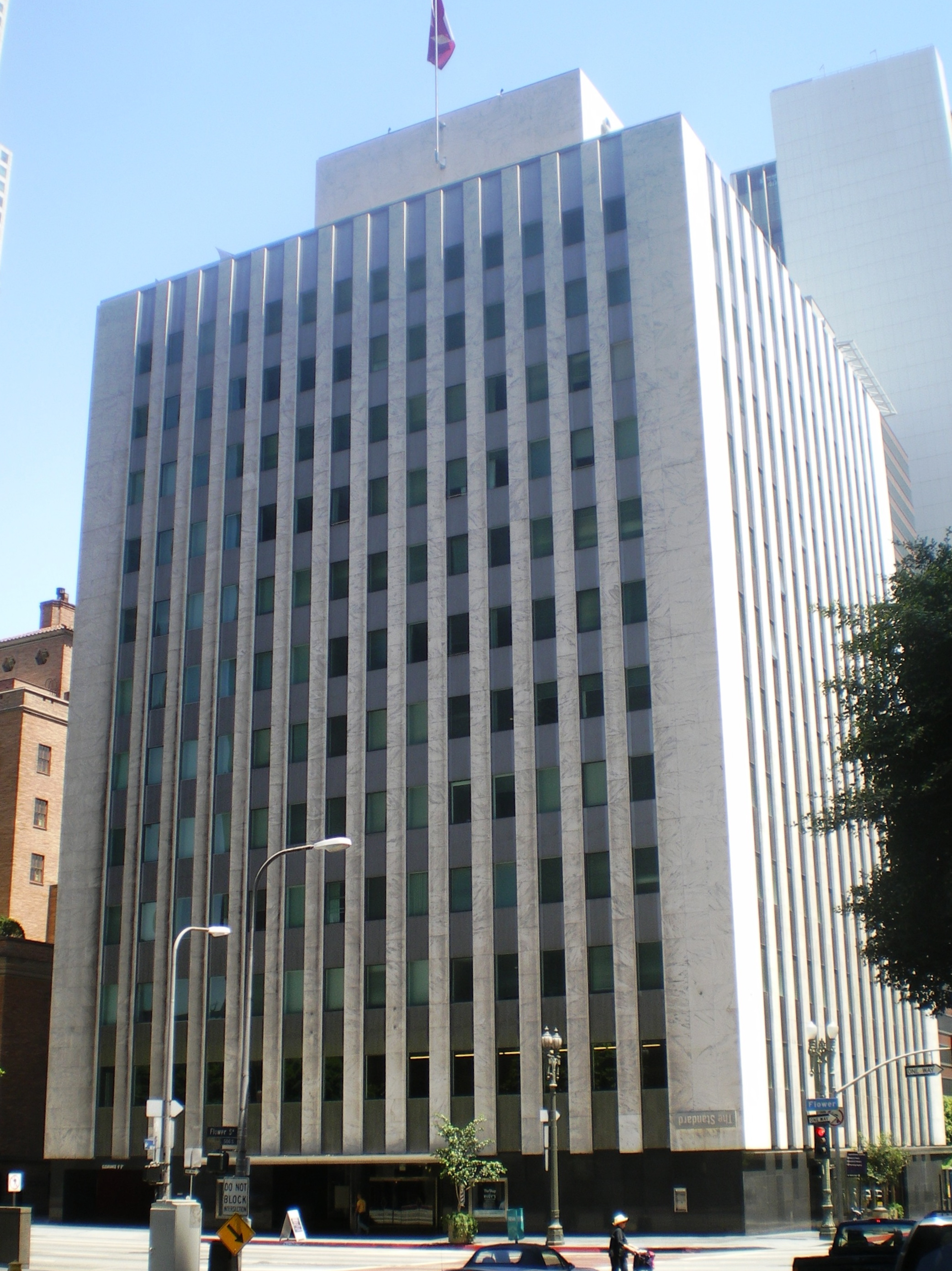
Bank of California Building (Los Angeles)

== See also ==
- Bank of California Building (disambiguation)
- Charles de Bretteville
- Edmond Adolphe de Rothschild
