= Talos No. 2 =

Sculpture in Portland, Oregon, U.S.

- The sculpture in June 2015
- Artist: James Lee Hansen
- Year: 1959–1977
- Type: Sculpture
- Medium: Bronze
- Subject: Talos
- Location: Portland, Oregon, United States; 45°31′16″N 122°40′39″W

Talos No. 2 is an outdoor 1959–1977 bronze sculpture created by the American artist James Lee Hansen. It is located in the Transit Mall of downtown Portland, Oregon, in the United States.

== Description ==
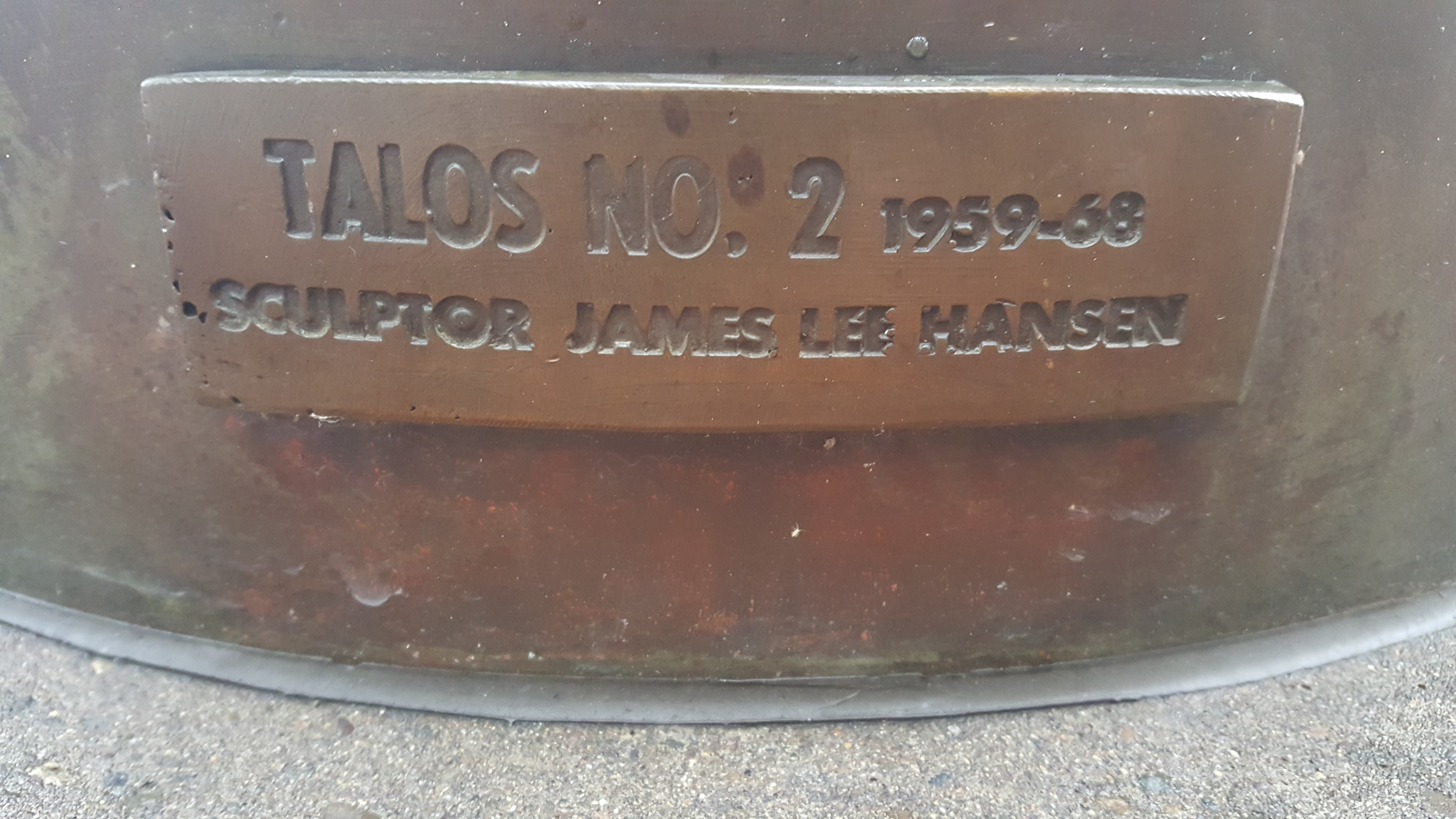
Inscription on the sculpture

James Lee Hansen's bronze sculpture Talos No. 2 is installed at the intersection of Southwest 6th Avenue and Stark Street on the Portland Transit Mall. The abstract statue depicts Talos, the giant man of bronze in Greek mythology who protected Crete from invaders. It is part of a series of works by Hansen called "Talos"; Talos, which is part of the Guardian series, was installed on Fulton Mall in downtown Fresno, California, in 1961, and the bronze Talos No. 3 (1984) is part of the collection of the Seattle Art Museum.

Talos is shown with three legs; other discernible body parts include a head, rib cage and hips. The piece is 7 feet (2.1 m) tall, or 66 inches (1.7 m) x 20 inches (0.51 m) x 20 inches (0.51 m), and weighs between 400 and 700 lbs. The work is administered by the Regional Arts & Culture Council (RACC), which has described the work as an "abstracted human figure on three legs with multiple short appendages on the torso and shoulders". Furthmore, the agency offers the following description of Talos and the sculpture he inspired:

He had one vein running from his neck to his ankle which flowed with lead, a sacred fluid believed to be the blood of the gods. This sculpture transforms the mythic figure into an abstracted form. Rather than mimicking the monumentality of the character, Hansen invokes him though this vaguely human but altogether otherworldly creature that seems to take in its surroundings from three directions at once, acting as a guardian to those who pass by.

RACC's public art collection manager has said Talos No. 2 is an "excellent" example of abstract sculpture from the 1970s.

== History ==
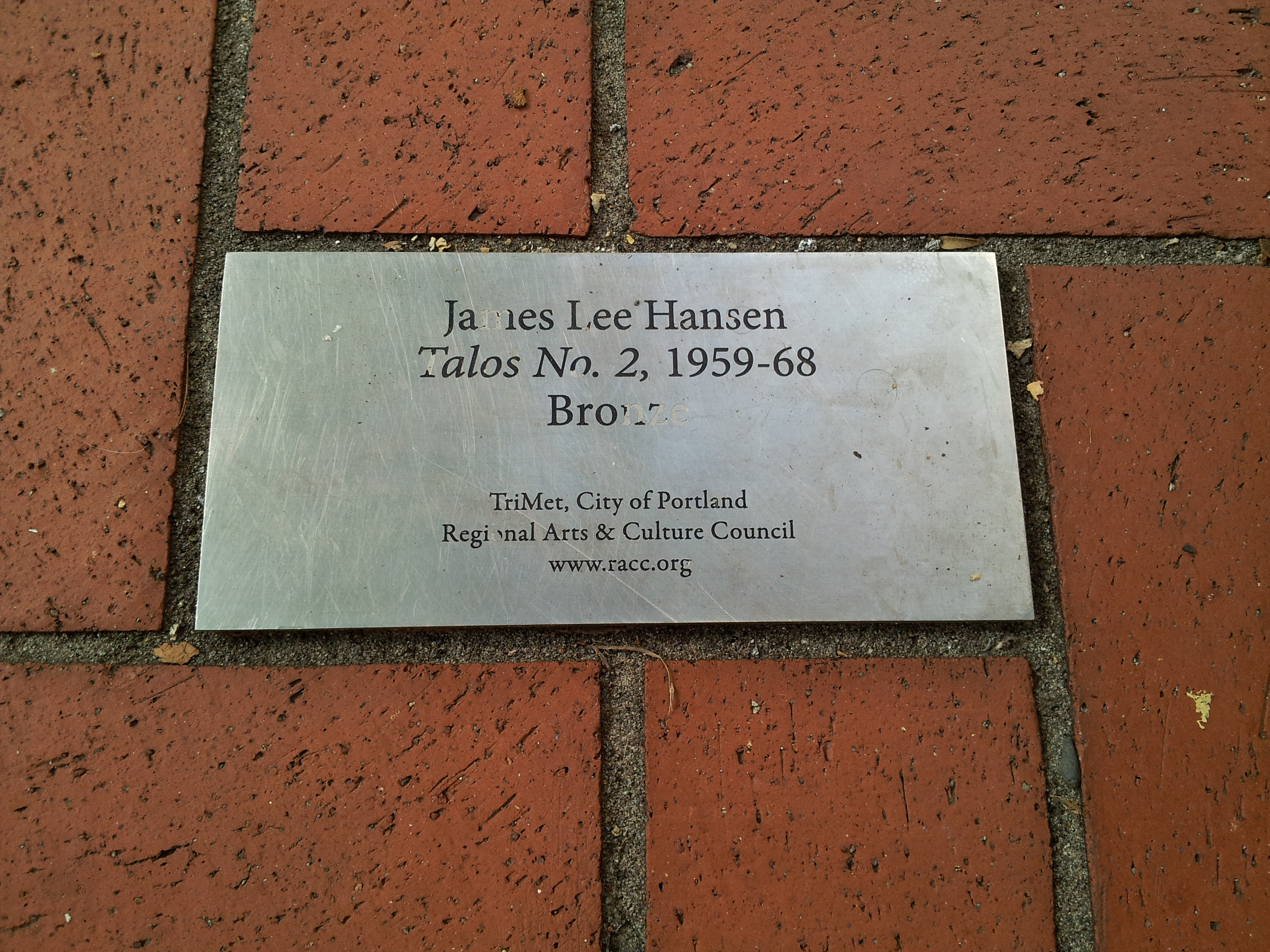
Plaque for the sculpture: James Lee Hansen Talos No. 2, 1959-68 Bronze TriMet, City of Portland Regional Arts & Culture Council www.racc.org

Talos No. 2 was completed during 1959–1977, and was funded by TriMet as part of its Percent for Art program, as well as the United States Department of Transportation, for $10,000. When the Transit Mall was completed in 1977, the sculpture was located in the block of 6th Avenue between Morrison and Alder streets. It was valued at $70,000 when the Transit Mall was reconstructed beginning in 2007. Along with nine other sculptures, it was placed in storage during that reconstruction, and when the mall reopened in 2009, Talos No. 2 was reinstalled, but at a different location—on 6th Avenue just north of its intersection with Stark Street.

The sculpture broke into several pieces in July 2015 after being toppled from its pedestal. Police took a suspect into custody, who was later charged with criminal mischief for damaging the statue. RACC staff thought the sculpture was irreparable when they first saw its pieces in the Portland Police Bureau Evidence Room. However, it was later determined repairs were possible because many of the breaks were along weld lines.

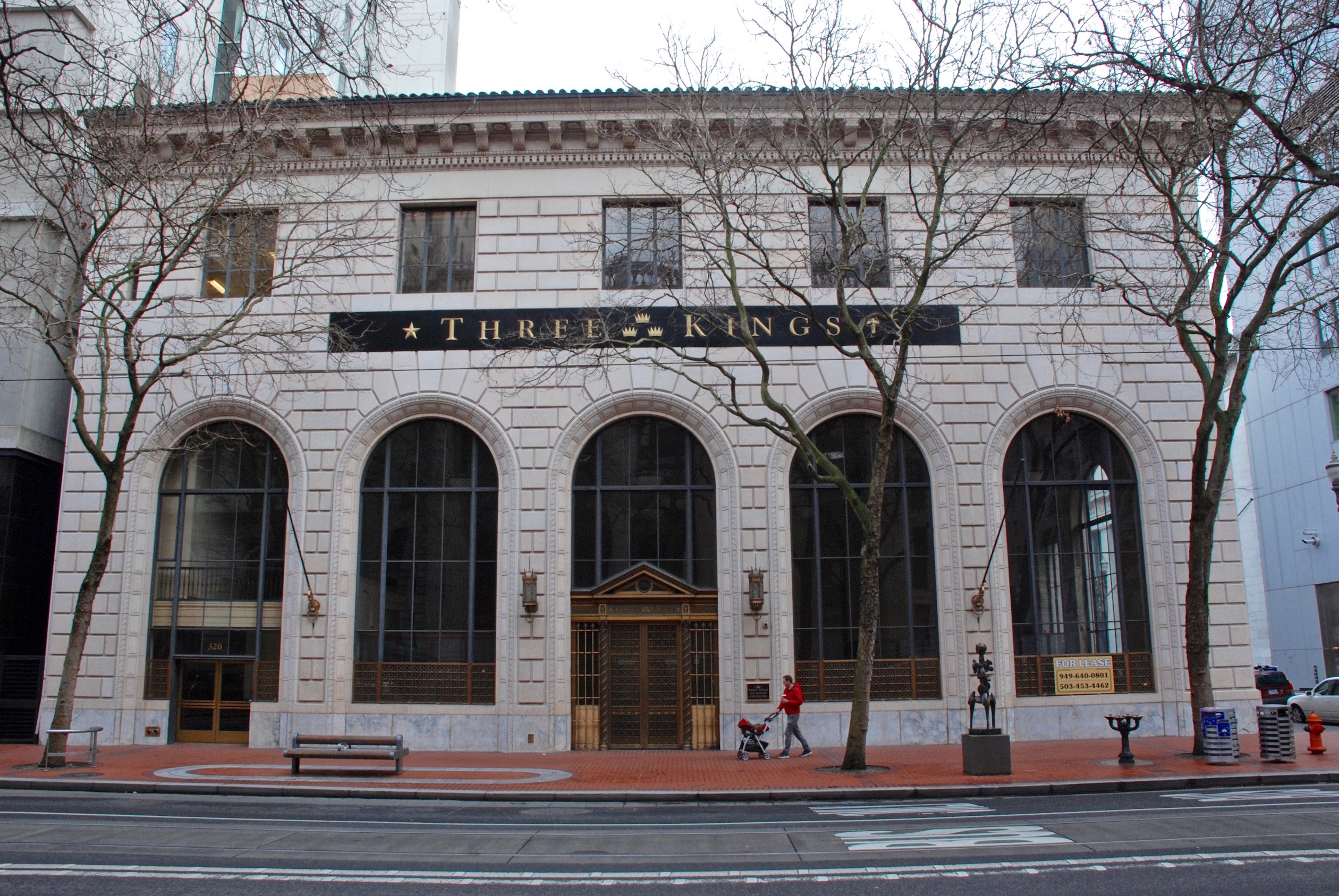
The sculpture stands in front of the historic Bank of California Building.

In September 2015, Portland Tribune reported that RACC was soliciting donations to offset repair costs, which were estimated at $3,750 by Portland's Cascadia Art Conservation Center. The repairs were partially financed by the city's insurance policy, which had a $2,500 deductible. RACC's public art collection manager said, "We're very hopeful the statue can be repaired and returned to the Transit Mall in a few months." Repairs included positioning five pieces, welding, and a chemical treatment, completed by Robert Krueger and welders from Art & Design Works over three months. Reinstallation occurred on October 30, 2015.

Hansen's Winter Rider No. 2 (2003) was installed on the Transit Mall, at the intersection of Southwest Sixth Avenue and Taylor Street, in February 2010. It was previously installed at the Public Service Building.

== See also ==
- 1959 in art
- 1977 in art
- Greek mythology in western art and literature
- The Falconer (Hansen), a sculpture by Hansen formerly installed at the University of Oregon
