= Bank of California Building =

Bank of California Building may refer to:

- Bank of California Building (Portland, Oregon)
- Bank of California Building (San Francisco), California
- Bank of California Building (Seattle), Washington

== See also ==
- Union Bank Tower (Portland, Oregon), formerly called the Bank of California Building
