= CAP Northwest =

Nonprofit organization in Oregon and Washington, U.S.

- Formation: 1983; 43 years ago
- Type: 501(c)(3) organization
- Tax ID no.: EIN 93-0903383
- Purpose: Healthcare and advocacy for people with HIV/AIDS
- Location: Portland, Oregon, United States
- Region served: Oregon, Southwest Washington

CAP Northwest (formerly Cascade AIDS Project, abbreviated as CAP) is a 501(c)(3) nonprofit organization based in Portland, Oregon, United States. Its mission is to prevent HIV infections, to support and empower people affected by HIV/AIDS, and to eliminate discrimination against people with HIV/AIDS. Founded in the mid-1980s, CAP is the "oldest and largest community-based provider of HIV services, housing, education and advocacy" in Oregon and Southwest Washington.

== History and operations ==
CAP Northwest (CAP) was founded in 1983, incorporated in 1985, and became a non-profit organization in 1986. Also in 1986, CAP merged with two similar organizations: Community Health and Essential Support Services (CHESS) and the Brinker Fund.

CAP operates Prism Health and other clinics in Portland, Vancouver, and Longview. It also operates a food pantry as well as an entity called Our House, formerly known as the Juniper House, which provides housing, healthcare, occupational therapy, and other services to people living with HIV/AIDS. CAP also runs a statewide HIV/AIDS and STI support hotline.

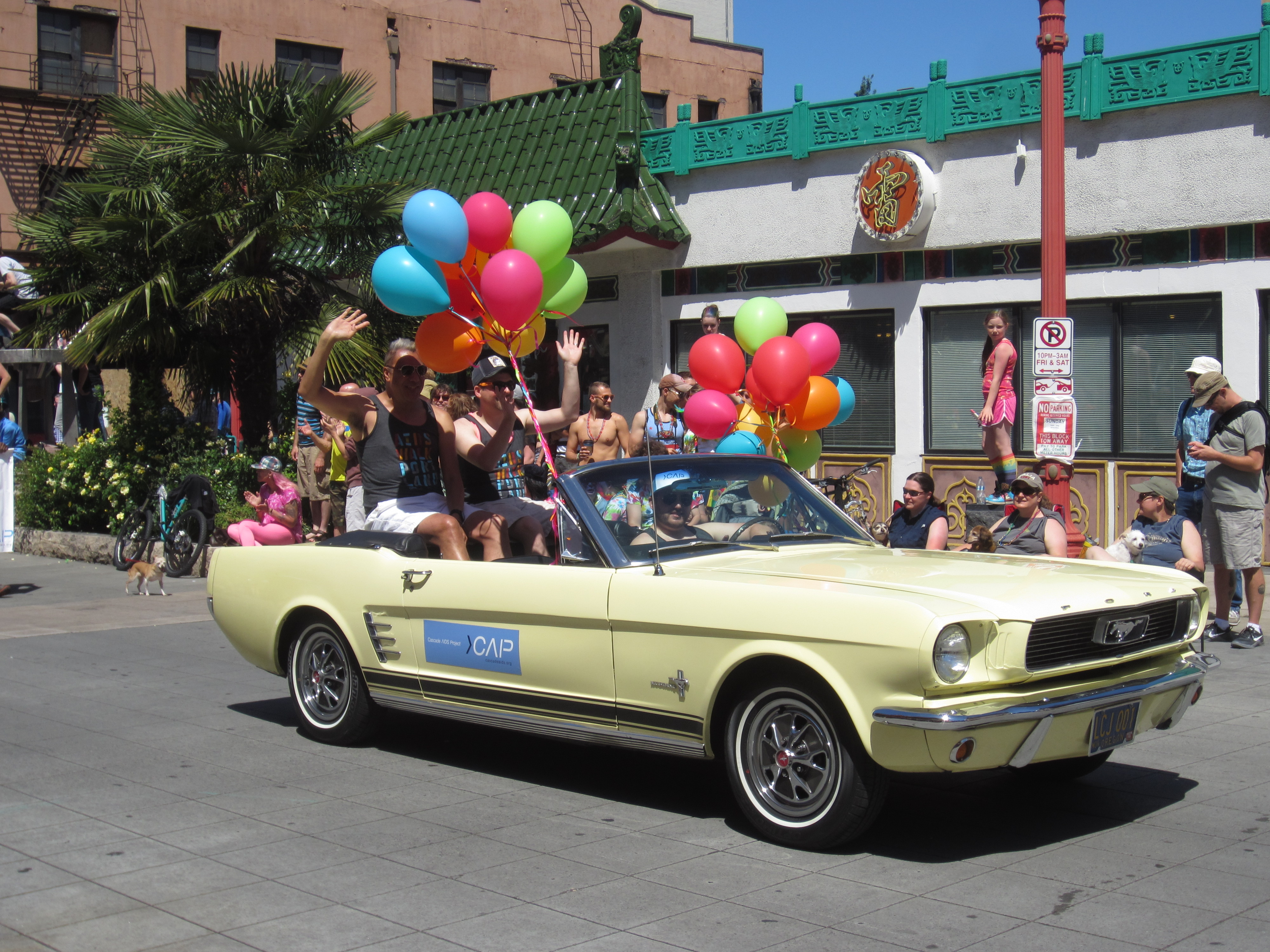
CAP vehicle at Portland Pride Festival, 2015

In October 2016, CAP employed about 60 people and served about 400 people per month. In 2017, Prism Health opened as an extension of CAP. By 2024, CAP provided services to over 20,000 people per year across all of its programs. In 2024, CAP collaborated with the Oregon Museum of Science and Industry (OMSI) to temporarily display sections of the NAMES Project AIDS Memorial Quilt in the museum.

CAP has historically received funding from the Centers for Disease Control and Prevention, United States Department of Health and Human Services, and the United States Department of Housing and Urban Development. It holds two major annual fundraising events: AIDS Walk Portland (since 1986), and an art auction (since 1989). Other partners and supporters include the Portland Gay Men's Chorus.

Brown McDonald was CAP's first executive director. Michael Kaplan was executive director from 2008 to 2012. Paul Lumley was the executive director from 2023 to 2025.

=== Leadership and workforce ===
Kevin Bumantay is CEO. Kristi Addis is Chief Programs Officer. Carrie Samuels is the deputy chief programs and strategy officer. Matthew Carron is senior director of development and communications.

The organization is also governed by a board of directors. As of January 2026, the board president is Kris Young of Nike, Inc., and other members include Daniel Borgen of New Seasons Market, Jason Desilet of OnPoint Community Credit Union, Christopher Friend of Swire Coca-Cola, Daniel Guilfoyle of the Native American Youth and Family Center, Brittany Kirkendall of CareOregon, Sarah Morris of Ernst & Young, and Oregon House Representative Travis Nelson, among others.

Portland-based drag performer and activist Poison Waters has worked with CAP for more than 30 years and was formerly on the board of directors.

Much of CAP's staff are unionized and about half of their employees are primary care workers.

== See also ==
- ACT UP
- AIDS/LifeCycle
- Basic Rights Oregon
- HIV/AIDS activism
- HIV/AIDS in the United States
- LGBTQ health
- LGBTQ rights in Oregon
