= The Falconer (Hansen) =

Bronze sculpture by J.L. Hansen in Eugene, Oregon, U.S.

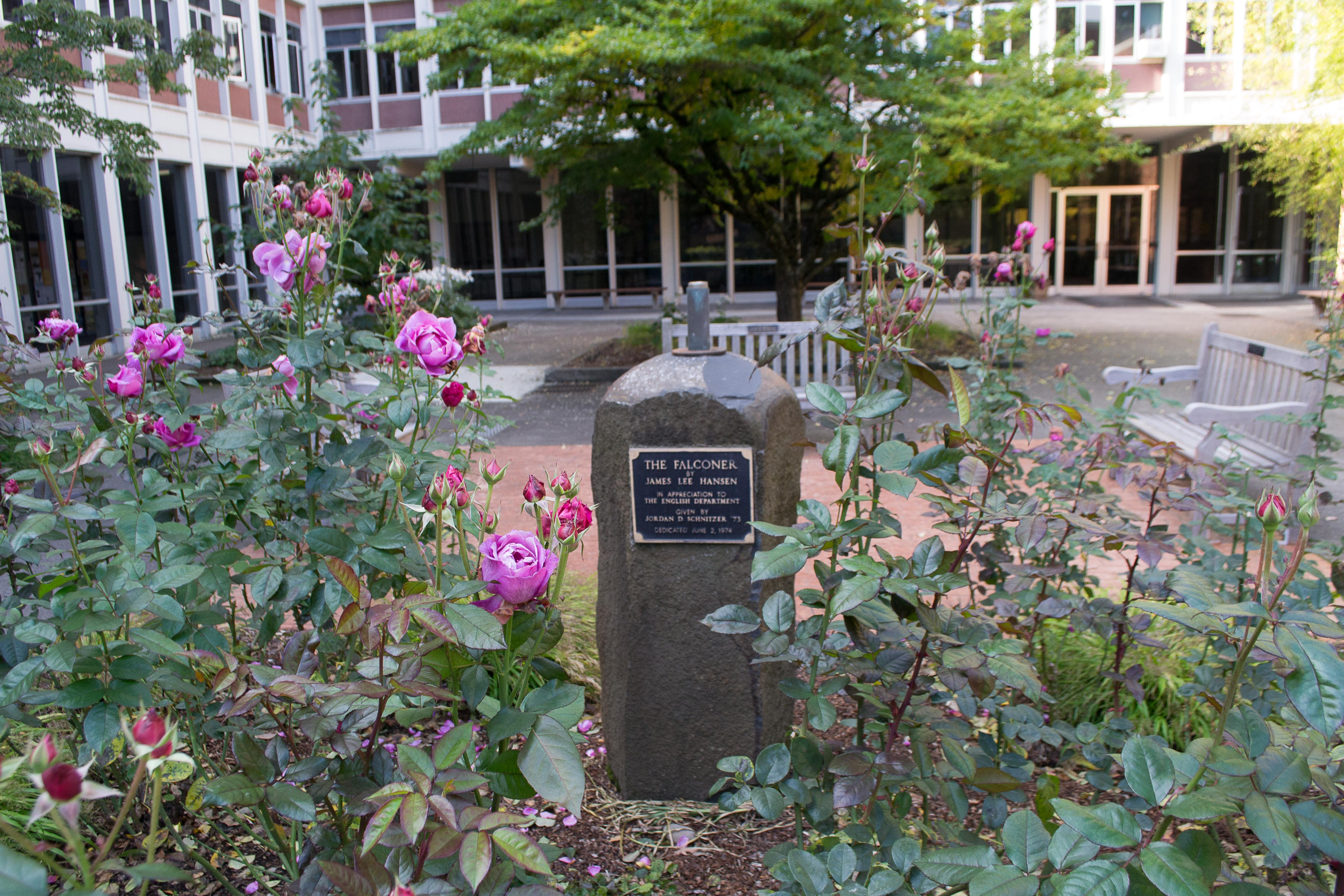
- The pedestal for James Lee Hansen's The Falconer (1973) in the courtyard of Prince Lucien Campbell Hall in 2013. The piece was stolen in 2008.
- Artist: James Lee Hansen
- Type: Sculpture
- Medium: Bronze
- Condition: "Treatment needed" (1994)
- Location: Eugene, Oregon, United States; 44.04428°N 123.07802°W
- Owner: University of Oregon

The Falconer is a bronze sculpture by James Lee Hansen. Dates for the abstract piece range from the 1960s to 1973.

== Description ==
The bronze sculpture, which depicts abstract tools of the falconry trade, measures approximately 3 feet (0.91 m) x 18 inches (0.46 m) x 14 inches (0.36 m) and weighs between 200 and 300 lbs. It rests on a concrete base that is 3 feet (0.91 m), 1 inch (2.5 cm) tall and has a diameter of 2 feet (0.61 m).

== History ==
The Falconer was installed by Prince Lucien Campbell Hall on the University of Oregon campus in Eugene, Oregon, after being donated by Jordan Schnitzer in 1974. The sculpture was surveyed and deemed "treatment needed" by the Smithsonian Institution's "Save Outdoor Sculpture!" program in 1994. It was stolen in November 2008. The university offered a $2,000 reward for information leading to the work's return.

== See also ==
- Campus of the University of Oregon
- Talos No. 2 (1959–1977) and Winter Rider No. 2 (2003), sculptures by Hansen in Portland, Oregon
