= Winter Rider No. 2 =

Sculpture in Portland, Oregon, U.S.

- The sculpture in 2015
- Artist: James Lee Hansen
- Year: 2003
- Type: Sculpture
- Medium: Bronze
- Subject: Horse and rider
- Dimensions: 2.1 m (7 ft)
- Location: Portland, Oregon, United States; 45°31′03″N 122°40′46″W

Winter Rider No. 2, also known as Winter Rider Variation, is an outdoor bronze sculpture by American artist James Lee Hansen, located on the Transit Mall of downtown Portland, Oregon.

== Description and history ==
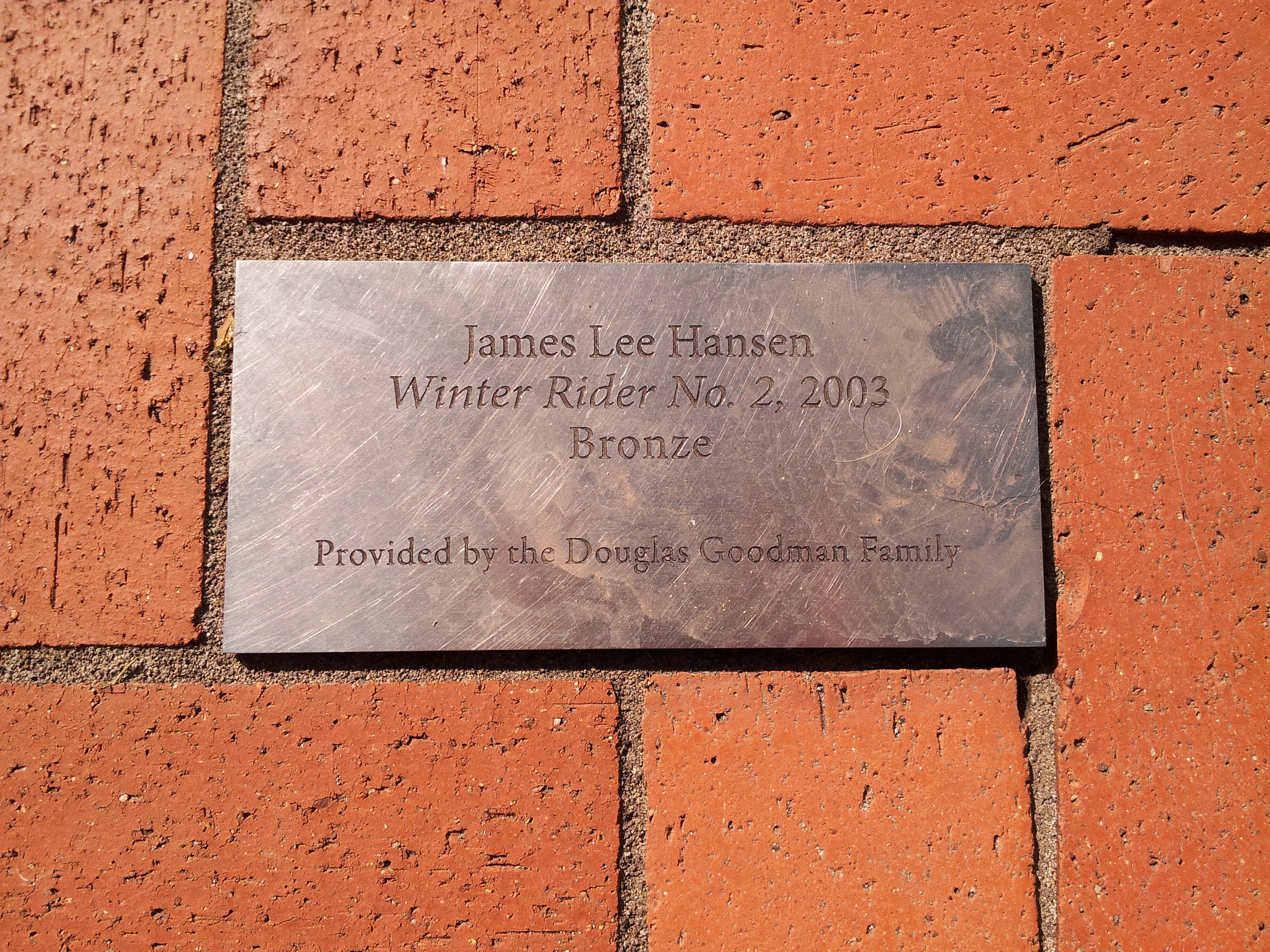
Plaque for the sculpture

Winter Rider No. 2 is a bronze sculpture by James Lee Hansen, located at the intersection of Southwest 6th Avenue and Taylor Street, Portland Transit Mall. Completed in 2003, the abstract 7-foot (2.1 m) tall equestrian statue depicts a horse and rider. It was installed at its current location in February 2010; previously, it was installed at the Public Service Building. The sculpture is owned by the Douglas Goodman family and is on loan to the city as part of the Transit Mall's Northwest sculpture collection.

Hansen's Talos No. 2 (1977) is also installed on the Transit Mall, at the intersection of Southwest Sixth Avenue and Stark Street.

== See also ==
- 2003 in art
- List of equestrian statues in the United States
- The Falconer (Hansen), a sculpture by Hansen formerly installed at the University of Oregon
