= Jerry Harris (artist) =

American artist

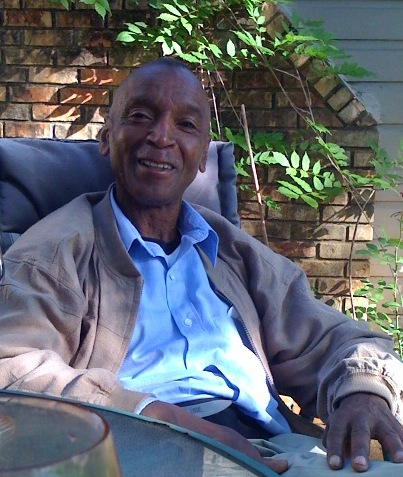
- Jerry Harris in 2008
- Born: November 23, 1945; Pittsburgh, Pennsylvania, United States of America
- Education: James Lee Hansen
- Alma mater: San Francisco State University
- Known for: Sculpture
- Style: Constructivist
- Spouse: Britt-Marie Olofsson-Harris (died 1996)
- Relatives: Shag Thomas (uncle)
- Elected: Associated Artists of Pittsburgh

Jerry Harris (November 23, 1945) is an abstract sculptor, collagist, and writer. Harris is primarily a constructivist sculptor, working in media such as wood, stone, bronze, fiberglass, clay, metal, mixed media (found objects), and collage.

== Biography ==
Harris was born in Pittsburgh, Pennsylvania. After graduating from high school in Pittsburgh, he spent a year in Portland, Oregon with his uncle, professional wrestler and referee Shag Thomas. Harris attended community college in Portland and then transferred to Tuskegee Institute in Alabama, and then San Francisco State University.

He then studied sculpture under James Lee Hansen, a leading Pacific Northwest sculptor who taught at Portland State University. Subsequently, Harris was accepted in the international sculptor's program at the St Martins School of Art in London, now Central Saint Martins College of Art and Design, where his teachers included Sir Anthony Caro, Phillip King, and Frank Martin. Harris also did special studies in bronze casting at the Central School of Art and Design under Henry Abercrombie.

Harris lived in Stockholm and Lund, Sweden, for many years until the death of his wife, Britt-Marie Olofsson-Harris, in 1996. He befriended many African-American visual artists while living in Sweden, such as Herbert Gentry and Harvey Cropper. In 1998 Harris returned to his hometown of Pittsburgh. He was elected into The Associated Artists of Pittsburgh, the nation's second-oldest artists' association, where he felt welcomed by the African-American sculptor Thaddeus Mosley. Harris later moved to Eugene, Oregon, and lived in Chico, California.

Since 1988 Harris was a member of the Swedish Sculptors Association. His sculptures are in many private national and international collections and in the permanent Swedish National Art Collection in Stockholm (Statenskonstrad). He exhibited throughout Sweden, elsewhere in Europe, and in the United States in various galleries and museums.
