= Hilton Portland Hotel =

Hotel in Portland, Oregon, U.S.

Hilton Portland Downtown and the Duniway Hotel

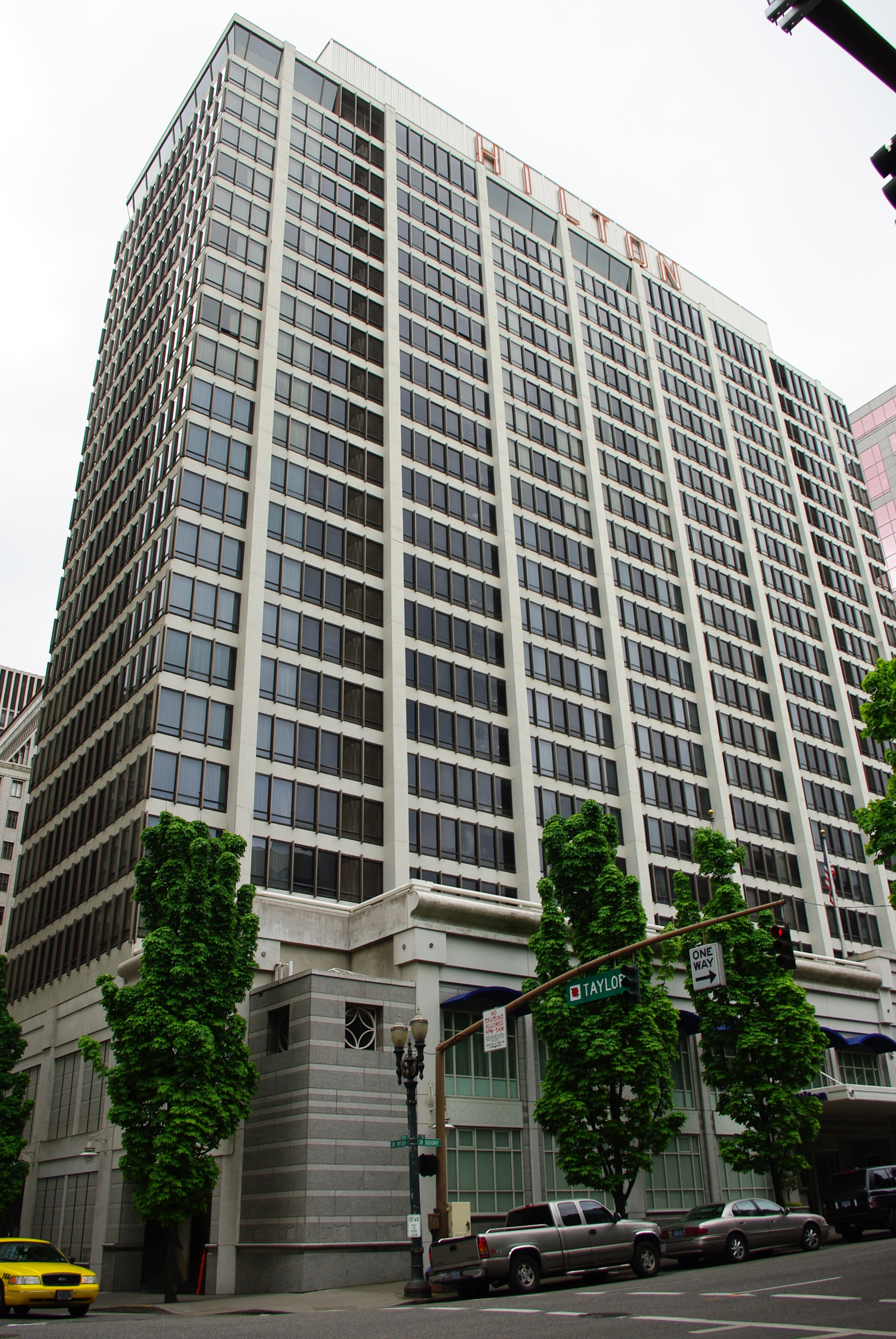
- The Hilton Portland Downtown

- Location within Portland, Oregon
- Former names: Hilton Portland & Executive Tower
- Hotel chain: Hilton Worldwide

General information
- Location: United States, 921 SW 6th Avenue; Portland, Oregon
- Coordinates: 45.5175°N 122.6800°W
- Opening: 1963 / 2002
- Owner: Thayer Lodging
- Management: Hilton Hotels & Resorts

Height
- Height: 73.46 m (241.0 ft) (1962 tower)

Technical details
- Floor count: 23

Design and construction
- Architects: Skidmore, Owings & Merrill; Zimmer Gunsul Frasca
- Main contractor: Andersen - Westfall

Other information
- Number of rooms: 782
- Number of restaurants: HopCity Tavern; HopCity Market; Porto Terra Tuscan Grill & Bar; Porto Terra Lounge

Website
- Portland Hotels – Hilton (official website)

The Hilton Portland Downtown and Duniway Hotel are a pair of Hilton-brand hotels located in downtown Portland, Oregon. The original 22-story, 240-foot (73 m) tower was completed in 1962 and was named the Hilton Portland. The second tower with 20 floors, located kitty-corner from the original building, to the northeast, was completed in 2002 and was originally named the Hilton Executive Tower, until its renaming as The Duniway Hotel in 2017. The 1962 building was the tallest building in the city for three years until surpassed by the Harrison West Condominium Tower in 1965.

== History ==
Contractors Andersen–Westfall built the original tower. A region-wide strike by the Carpenters Union paused the project in April 1962 when union workers went on strike and picketed the construction site. When the top full floor was finished in August 1962, the building became the tallest in Portland, overtaking the Public Service Building. At that point the structure stood at 229 feet (70 m) tall and was scheduled to top out at 249 feet (76 m) when the penthouse was added. The $12.5 million hotel was dedicated in May 1963 with a ceremony featuring Conrad Hilton, U.S. Senator Mark O. Hatfield, and Mayor Terry Schrunk. At opening, it had 500 rooms, 5 restaurants and bars, 9 meeting rooms, and was designed as a convention center. The Executive Tower, at 545 S.W. Taylor Street, stands kitty-corner from the original structure and was completed in 2002.

In 2005, Hilton Hotels sold the two-building hotel to Cornerstone Real Estate Advisors LLC for $83.9 million. Cornerstone sold the hotel in 2012 for about $100 million to Walton Street Capital and Lodging Capital Partners. In 2015, Walton Street sold the complex for $270 million to Brookfield Property Partners and an unnamed partner.

In 2016, a renovation of both buildings began. The Executive Tower closed temporarily for the work, and when reopened in June 2017 it was renamed the Duniway Hotel but retaining its Hilton affiliation. The Duniway name was chosen in honor of Abigail Scott Duniway, an early women's rights advocate and newspaper editor in Portland.

== Details ==
Combined between the two towers, the Hilton has 782 rooms, making it the largest hotel in Portland. The original tower does not have a thirteenth floor.
