= Pacific Building (Portland, Oregon) =

Historic building in Portland, Oregon, U.S.

- The Pacific Building
- U.S. National Register of Historic Places
- Portland Historic Landmark
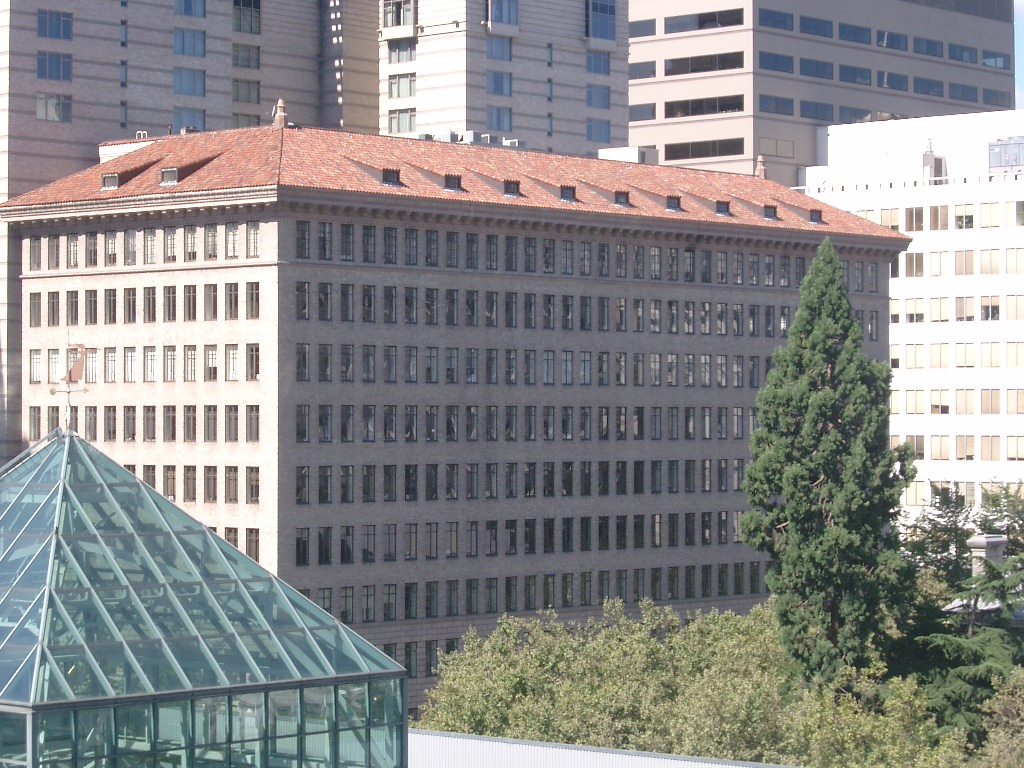
- The Pacific Building in 2007

- Location within Portland, Oregon
- Location: 520 SW Yamhill Street; Portland, Oregon
- Coordinates: 45°31′05″N 122°40′43″W
- Area: less than one acre
- Built: 1926
- Architect: A.E. Doyle & Associates
- Architectural style: Renaissance
- NRHP reference No.: 92000091
- Added to NRHP: March 5, 1992

The Pacific Building is a historic office building in downtown Portland, Oregon, United States. It has been listed on the National Register of Historic Places since March 5, 1992.

This building was the second of three similarly-Italianate buildings built in Portland by prolific local architect A.E. Doyle's firm. The project's primary designer, Charles K. Greene, worked on the trio of Italianate Doyle-commissioned buildings in Portland: the smaller Bank of California Building (also completed in 1924), the Pacific Building, and the Public Service Building (a skyscraper completed in 1928). A young Pietro Belluschi started his career with A.E. Doyle working on this building, and later in it. Upon its opening in 1926, Doyle moved his firm's headquarters into the Pacific Building.

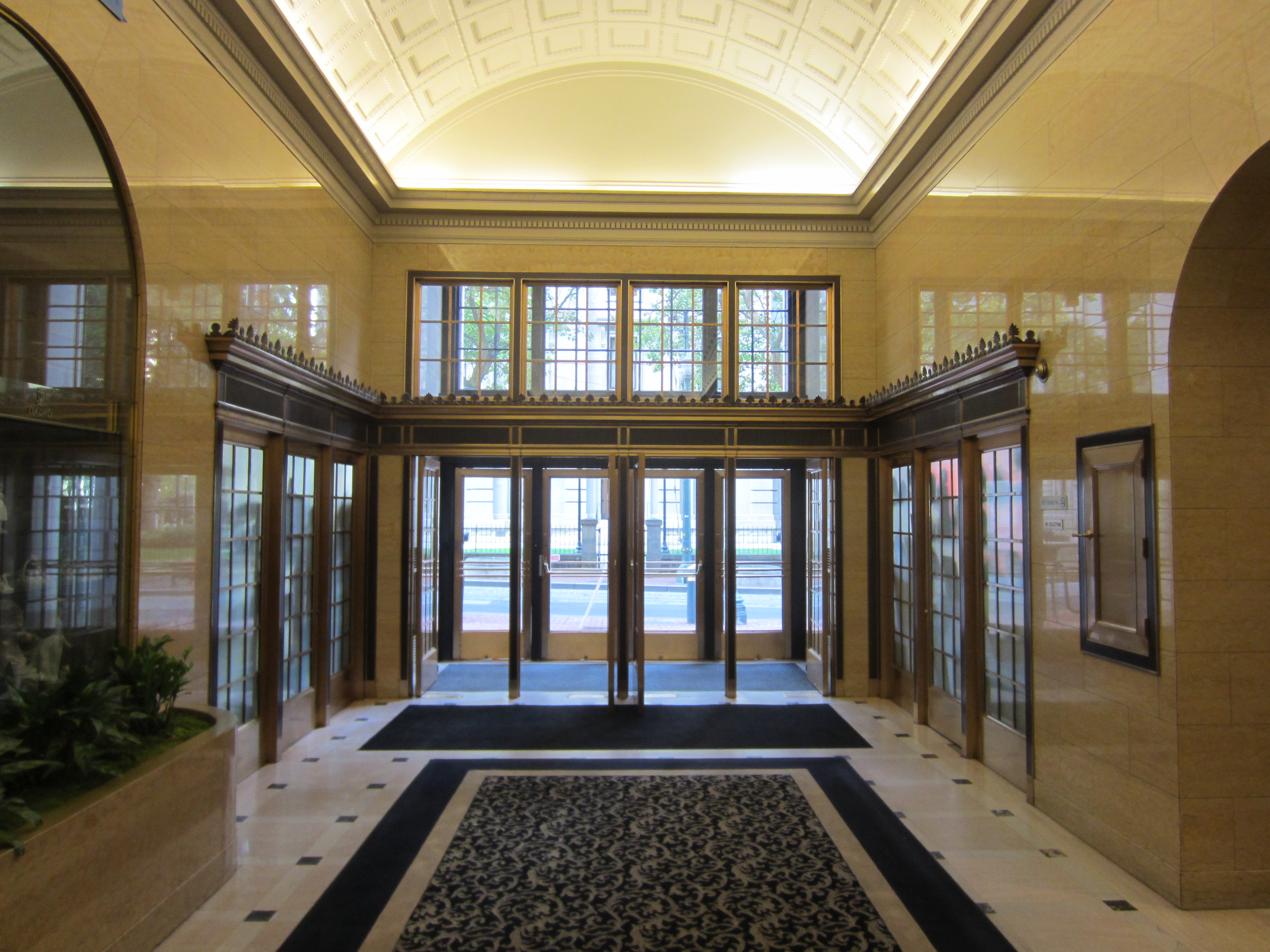
The lobby of the Pacific Building

The lobby of the 10-story building was designed by Belluschi, and connected to Portland's first underground parking garage. The connection to the parking garage was lost in 2000 when the former bus station to the south (which sat on top of the garage) was torn down and replaced by an annex to the nearby Hilton Hotel. Architecturally, the Pacific Building appears to combine the Chicago School with Italian Renaissance architecture. The red tile roof and dormers combine with geometric windows that are almost flush with the facade to achieve this effect.

The lot upon which the Pacific Building stands is across Yamhill Street from Pioneer Courthouse, in the heart of downtown Portland. The lot once was the part of the grounds of the Henry Corbett mansion (built 1875), while the house and coachhouse remained on the south side of the block after construction of the Pacific Building. Corbett's widow continued to live in the house until her death in 1936, sharing the block for ten years with the Pacific Building. She had kept a cow on the part of her grounds where the Pacific Building now stands while a major city grew around it. This juxtapositioning of the old and new earned the lot a nickname: "The Million Dollar Cowpasture".. The Pacific Building was built in 1926 by her three grandsons Henry L. Corbett, Elliott R. Corbett and Hamilton Corbett on the northern half of her grounds that the "cowpasture" had previously occupied.

== See also ==
- Architecture of Portland, Oregon
- National Register of Historic Places listings in Southwest Portland, Oregon
