= Prism Health =

LGBTQ health clinic in Portland, Oregon, U.S.

Coordinates: 45°30′58.4″N 122°38′34.0″W

- Logo

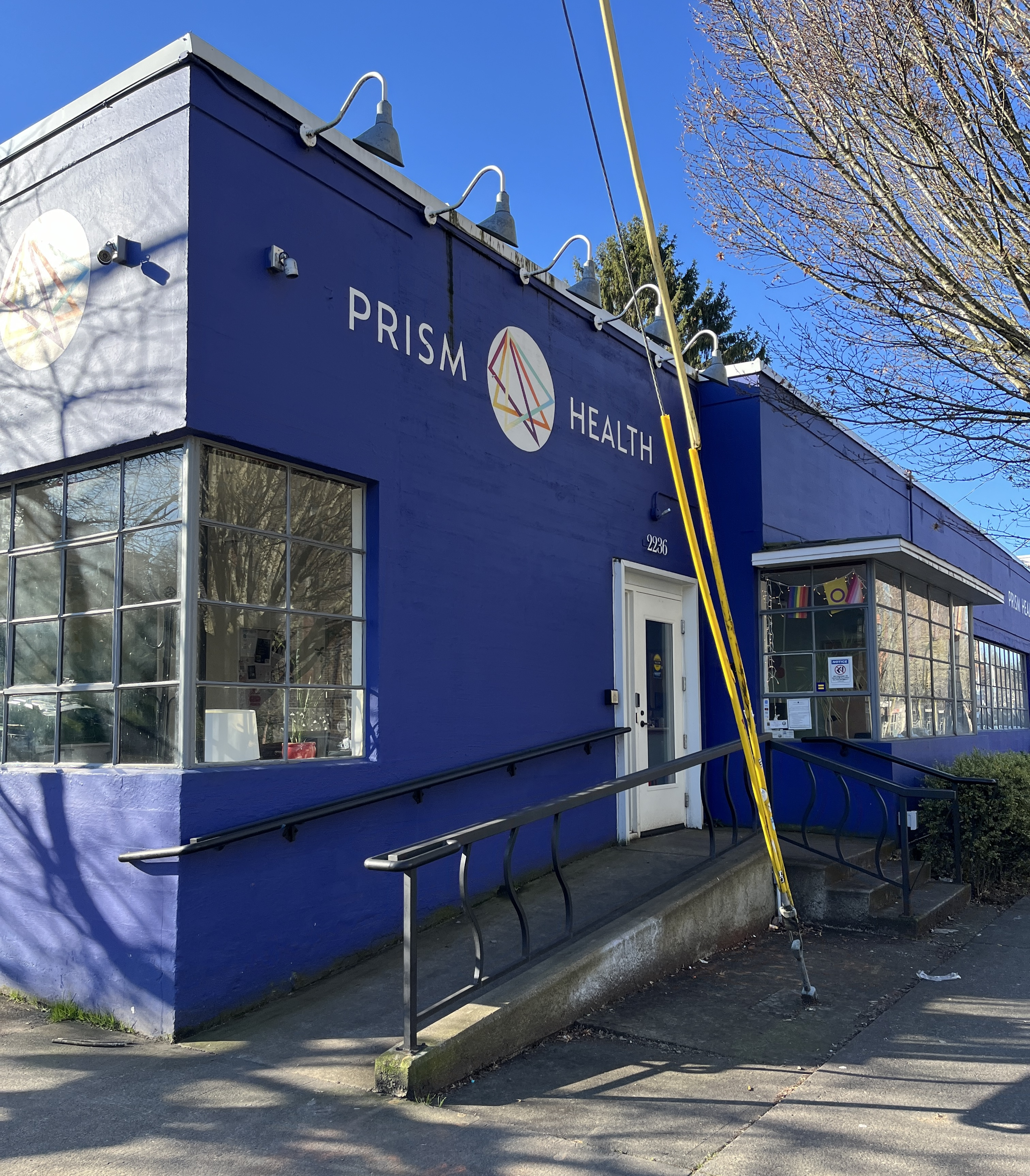
- The building's exterior in 2025
- Headquarters: 2236 Southeast Belmont Street, Portland, Oregon, United States
- Website: prismhealth.org

Prism Health is a health clinic located on Southeast Belmont Street, in Portland, Oregon's Buckman neighborhood, in the United States. Prism became Oregon's first LGBTQ primary health clinic in 2017, and opened as an extension of the CAP Northwest (formerly Cascade AIDS Project).

The 7,750-square-foot space has 10 exam rooms, plus additional rooms for meetings and counseling, gender-neutral restrooms, and a pharmacy. Prism provides HIV and STI testing, mental and transgender health services, and free condoms and dental dams.

The clinic received $200,000 in operational support from Multnomah County.

== See also ==
- Healthcare and the LGBTQ community
