= OnPoint Plaza =

Skyscraper in Portland, Oregon

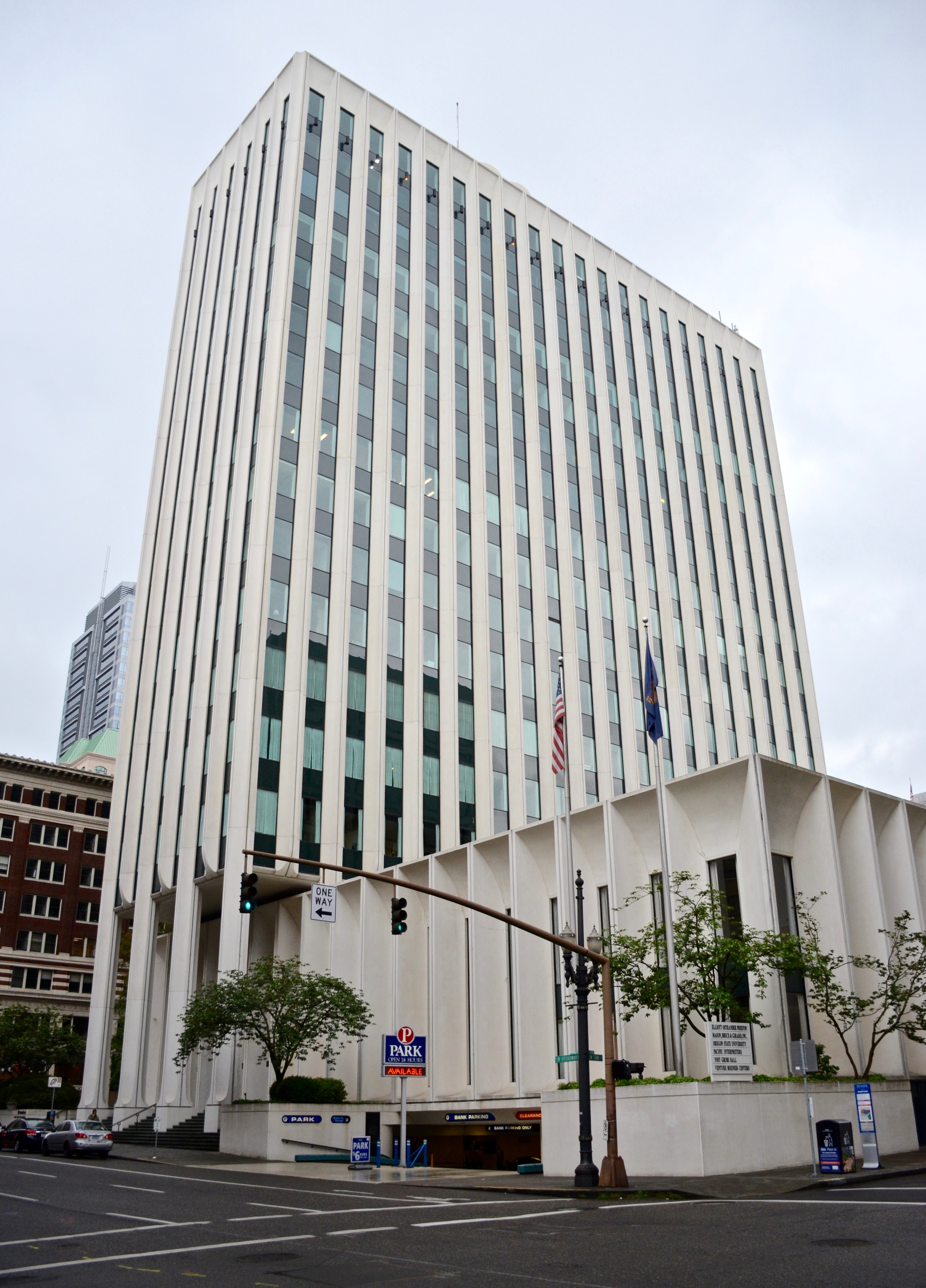
- Viewed from the northeast in 2016

- Location within Portland, Oregon
- Former names: Bank of California Building (1969–1996); Union Bank of California Tower (1996 – c. 2009); UnionBank Tower (c. 2009 – 2026

General information
- Type: Commercial offices
- Location: 707 SW Washington Street; Portland, Oregon
- Coordinates: 45.521°N 122.6795°W
- Completed: 1969

Height
- Roof: 81.69 m (268.0 ft)

Technical details
- Floor count: 15
- Floor area: 200,000 sq ft (19,000 m^{2})

Design and construction
- Architect: Anshen + Allen
- Developer: Wright Runstad & Company

OnPoint Plaza, formerly known as the UnionBank Tower, Union Bank of California Tower, and originally as the Bank of California building), is an 82 m (269 ft), 15-story office building completed in 1969 in downtown Portland, Oregon. It was briefly the tallest building in the city when it topped-out in 1968, but was soon eclipsed by the Georgia-Pacific Building (now Standard Insurance Center).

== History ==
The tower was built for the Bank of California, to house its Portland operations, which had outgrown their space in the historic Bank of California Building in which they had been based since 1925, located just over one block to the east. Construction began in 1967. The full-block site was previously occupied, in its southeast quadrant, by the Rosenblatt Building, which was built in 1889 and demolished in early 1967. Two theaters had occupied other portions of the block, the United Artists Theatre and the Liberty Theatre (previously known as the Music Box Theatre).

The bank building was completed in late 1969, and the bank opened its offices in the new tower on December 8, 1969, vacating its 1925 building. The 15-story building was originally known as the Bank of California building (or simply the [new] Bank of California), and informally as the Bank of California Tower.

It was originally owned by the bank, but in 1972 a pending sale of the building to developer Harry Mittleman was reported. Mittleman completed the purchase in that year and moved into an office on the building's 15th floor. The 1972 sale included a leaseback agreement under which the Bank of California would lease the building for up to 35 years. In 1986, after Mittleman's death, the building was owned by his estate, but the "long-term master lease" was planned to be transferred from the Bank of California to a partnership of Melvin Mark Properties and Douglas Goodman in January 1987. The bank continued to be the building's primary tenant, leasing 56,000 square feet (5,200 m^{2}) of the overall 197,000 ft^{2} (18,300 m^{2}) of space at that time.

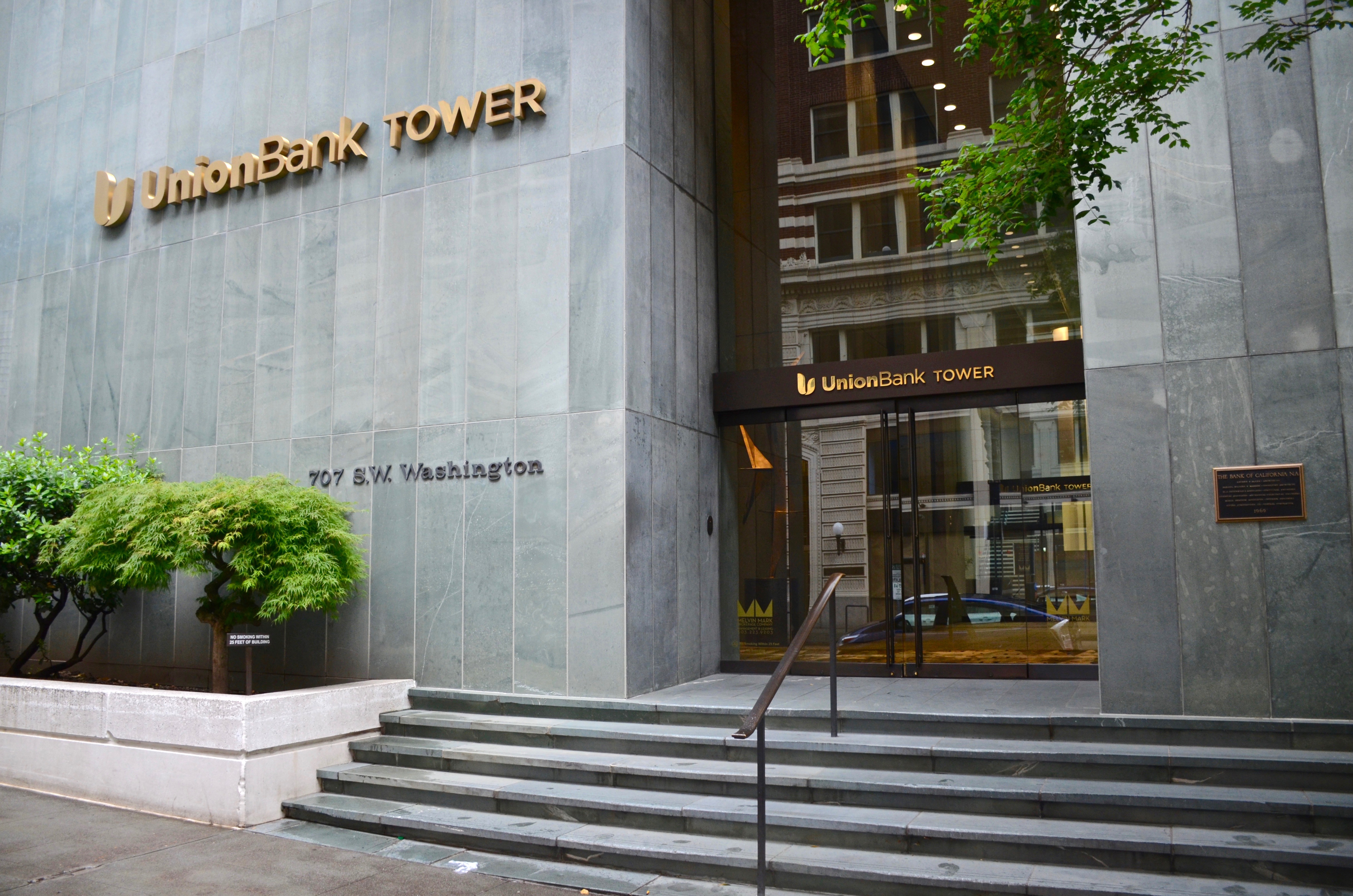
The south entrance in 2016, showing the greenish-gray slate that covers portions of the building

In April 1996, Bank of California merged with Union Bank to become Union Bank of California. The Portland building was renamed the Union Bank of California Building in September of that year.

In 2008, The Bank of Tokyo-Mitsubishi UFJ acquired the 35 percent of Union Bank that it had not already owned, and Union Bank of California became MUFG Union Bank, which uses the branding "UnionBank". Subsequently, the Portland building became the UnionBank Tower.

As of 2012, the building was owned by both Melvin Mark Companies and Downtown Development Group. In 2012, the owners turned a subbasement level into a fourth level of underground parking, increasing the number of parking spaces by 84 for a total of 339.

Melvin Mark Companies sold the tower in 2026 to Menlo Equities. In April of that year, the building's name was changed to OnPoint Plaza after OnPoint Community Credit Union opened a branch and moved some of their offices to the building.

== Description ==
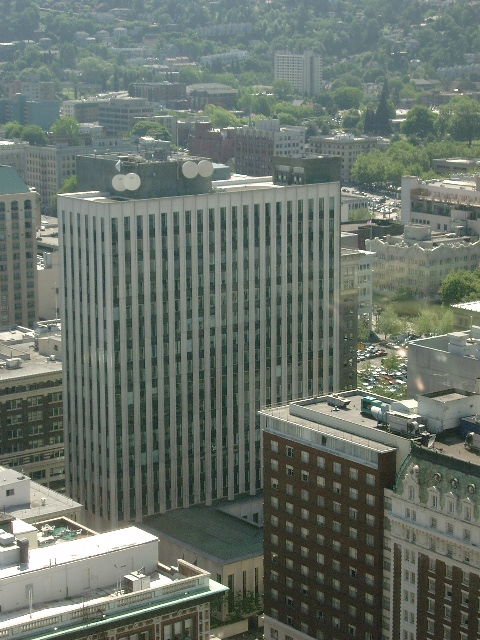
Seen from the U.S. Bancorp Tower

The tower was designed by the firm of Anshen and Allen of San Francisco in the International Style, with a strong presence on Broadway. A distinctive feature of the Union Bank Tower are its exposed service cores, on the building's south and west sides, which are clad in light gray slate with a greenish tint. It is said that the slate was quarried from the same area in Wales as the stone used in Stonehenge.

The building's interior design was led by Maria Bergson, of New York City.

== See also ==
- Architecture of Portland, Oregon
- List of tallest buildings in Portland, Oregon
