= Bank of California Building (Seattle) =

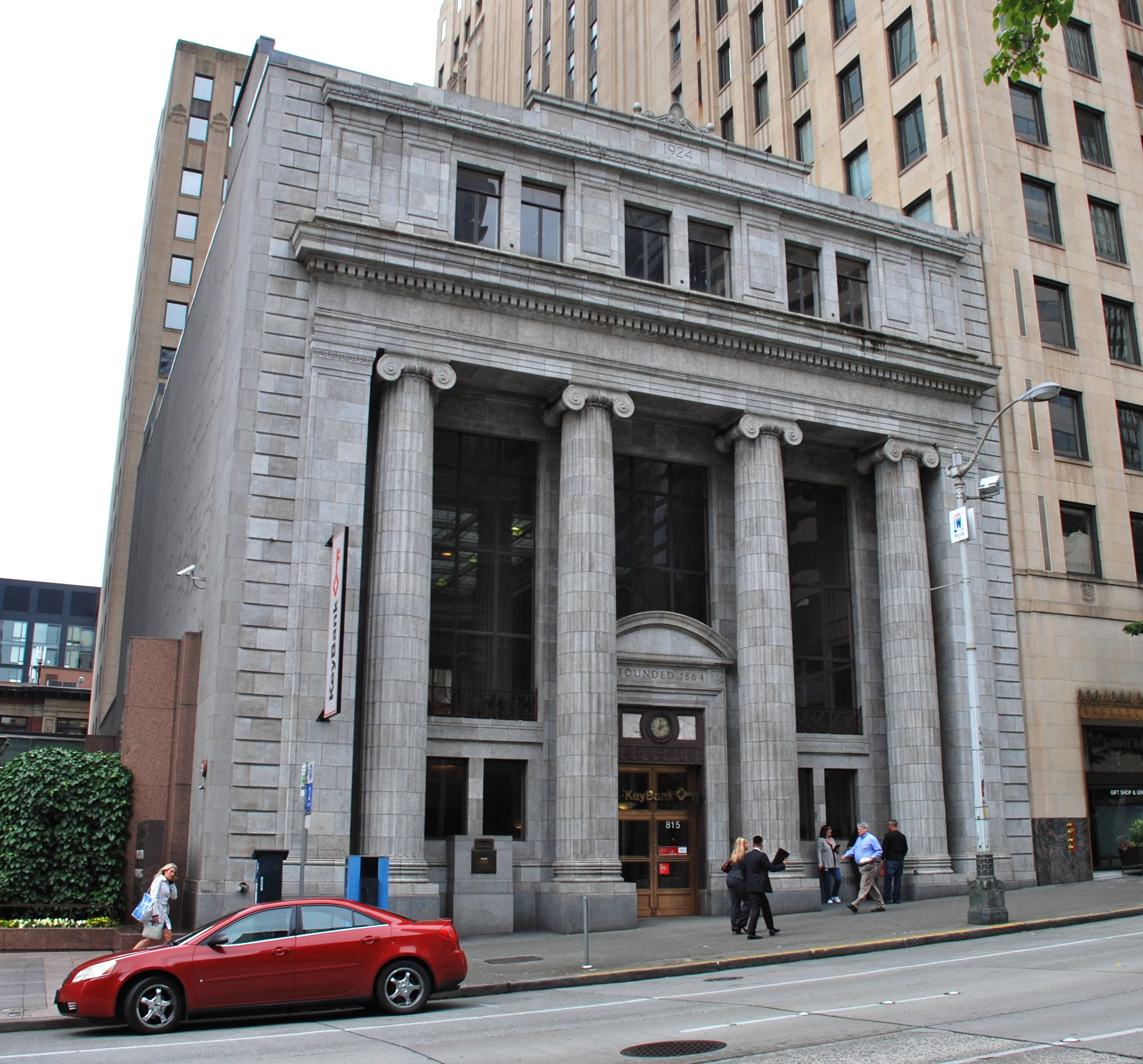
- The Bank of California Building in 2014

- Location within Downtown Seattle
- 47°36′15″N 122°20′4″W
- Location: Seattle, Washington

History
- Built: 1924

Site notes
- Area: 6,960 sq ft.
- Architect: John Graham, Sr.
- Architectural style: Neoclassical Revival
- Owner: Private

Seattle Landmark
- Designated: September 8, 1987

The Bank of California Building is a landmark building located at 815 2nd Avenue in Seattle, Washington. It is located mid-block adjoining the Exchange Building. It was built by the Bank of California (predecessor to the Union Bank of California) in 1924 and has been continually used as a bank ever since. It housed the offices for the Bank of California until 1973 when a new building, the Union Bank of California Center was built at the corner of 4th and Madison Streets. Ironically, this newer, larger building is no longer used as a bank and instead is occupied by a Bartell Drugs store. The original Bank of California Building was retained as a branch office until being sold to the Puget Sound Mutual Savings Bank in 1982 which was headquartered in the building until 1993 when through a series of mergers and acquisitions the bank became a branch of Key Bank, which it remains to present day.

It is a rectangular two-story plus basement, reinforced concrete building faced with terra cotta meant to imitate stone. It features a sky-lit banking room that spans all floors and includes a mezzanine. It was designed in a "strict Italian Renaissance" style typical of many banks in the 1920s by John Graham & Company, one of Seattle's most prominent architectural firms. Graham's firm under his predecessor, John Graham, Jr., would also design the building's aforementioned replacement in 1973.

The Bank of California Building was designated a City of Seattle Landmark in 1987.

== History ==
The Bank of California, organized in San Francisco in 1864, came to Seattle in 1905 with the acquisition of the London and San Francisco Bank who had branches in Seattle, Tacoma and Portland, Oregon. The Bank of California became a national bank in 1910 and soon was one of the biggest banks west of the Mississippi River. By the early 1920s the bank had outgrown its small office at the Northwest corner of 2nd Avenue and Columbia Street. In May 1923, the bank purchased the Epler Block located two doors north of their own from the Epler Estate for $160,000 with the intention of building a new bank building on the site. The property had been purchased in 1882 by W.F. Epler who, following the Great Seattle fire, built a substantial four-story brick and stone building on the lot that was completed in 1890.

The bank chose the John Graham firm to design a two-story plus mezzanine concrete structure with a terra cotta facade that would cost around $200,000 but would actually cost $50,000 more. A completed architectural sketch of the building was published in the Seattle Times on September 25, 1923. A preliminary and apparently innovative concept hatched during the building's designing was to incorporate customer parking in the building's basement. It is unknown whether this idea was actually implemented. Demolition of the Epler Block began in November 1923 and lasted for several months. Construction began in early 1924 and by May of that year, the concrete structure was complete. The building officially opened to the public on August 25, 1924.

The bank continued to expand by opening offices in the adjoining Exchange Building and constructing a parking garage to the south. By the late 1960s, they were ready to expand and set out to construct the Union Bank of California Center, which covered an entire city block bound by Madison, Marion, Fourth and Fifth Avenues and would contain over 150,000 square feet (14,000 m^{2}) of space for the bank, much more than the old building had. When the new bank opened in early 1974, the original building was retained as a branch office which prompted local banks to file suit claiming unfair competition, which was later overturned. By 1983, Bank of California had left the building and it became the main office of the Savings Bank of Puget Sound, formerly the Puget Sound Mutual Savings Bank. The savings bank was purchased by Puget Sound Bancorp of Tacoma in 1986 which in turn was acquired by KeyCorp in 1993. The building has housed a Key Bank branch ever since.

== Description ==
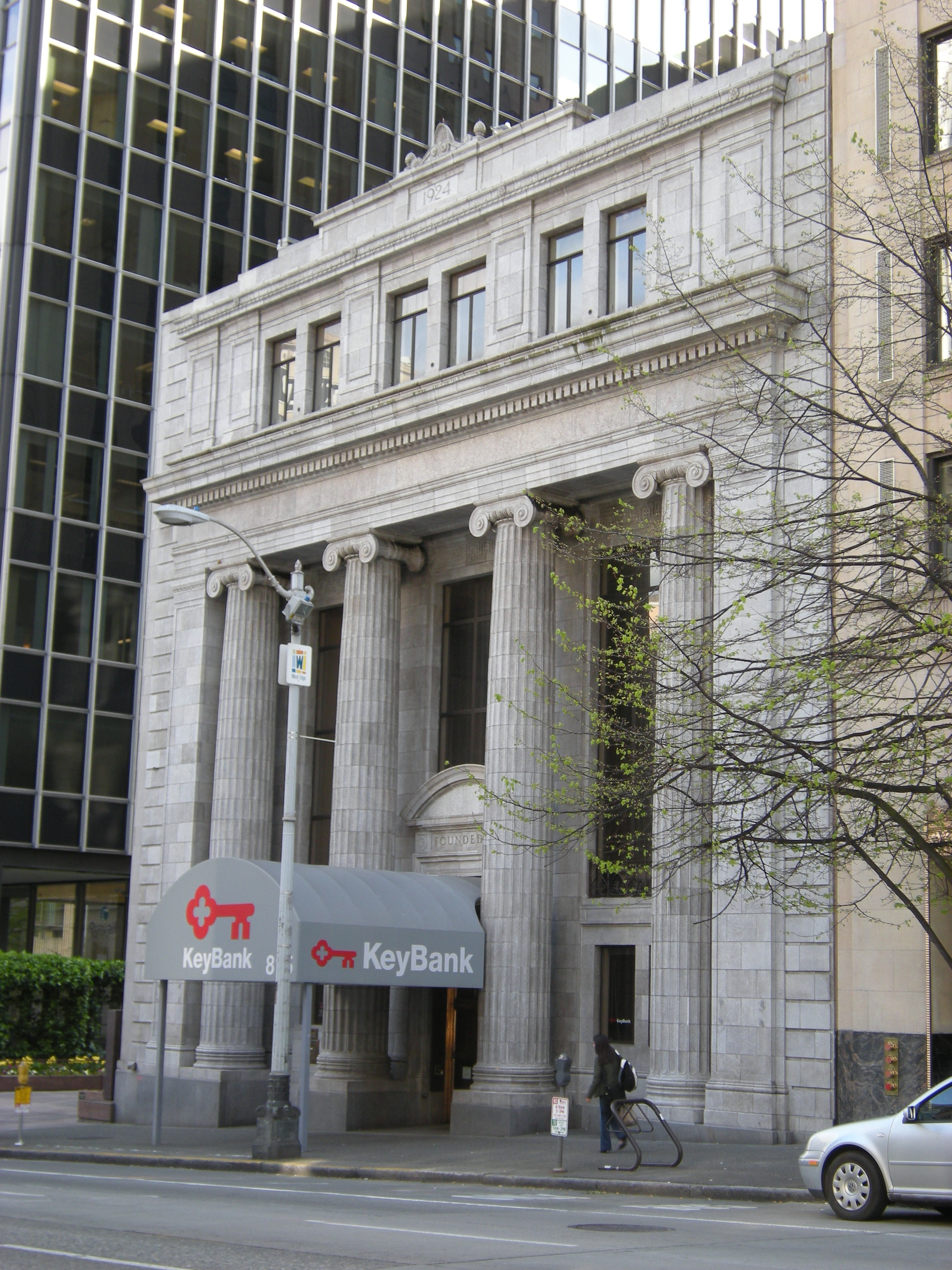
The building in 2008, before the modern entrance canopy was removed

=== Exterior ===
The 60-foot (18 m) wide Second Avenue facade of the Bank is clad in gray glazed terra cotta meant to imitate stone. The facade is composed of large windows framed by four free standing Roman ionic columns with two related pilasters, the center space being slightly spread to allow for the entrance doors, capped with a large arched pediment. The entablature is crowned by an attic forming the fourth floor. The design follows the Ionic order and includes an architrave and frieze which once bore the name of the bank but is now bare. Above the fourth floor is a smaller cornice topped with a pediment bearing the building's date of construction.

=== Interior ===
The main feature of the bank was the 60 by 70-foot (21 m) main banking room with a 40-foot (12 m) high rotunda ceiling. The interior was described by The Seattle Times in an August, 1924 article:

The high ceiling is semi-pompeian in design with polychromatic with an overall octagon motif. The pilasters are adorned with magnificent bronze torch lights. The columns are bronzed and the metal work surrounding the columns is old bronze to blend in its entirety with the marble counters, the walnut woodwork and the genuine bronze grill work.

The marble used for the counters and floors was variegated Escolette imported from France while woodwork was made of polished black walnut. Large clocks, with dials of escolette were centered in balcony grill work at each end of the main lobby. Offices were located on each balcony. The basement housed the vaults and recreation rooms for employees while the fourth floor contained offices and a large club room for employees.

== See also ==
- List of landmarks in Seattle
- Bank of California Building (Portland, Oregon)
