= OnPoint Community Credit Union =

Credit union in the Pacific Northwest

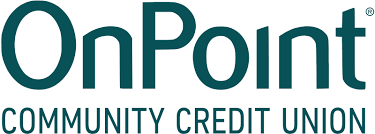

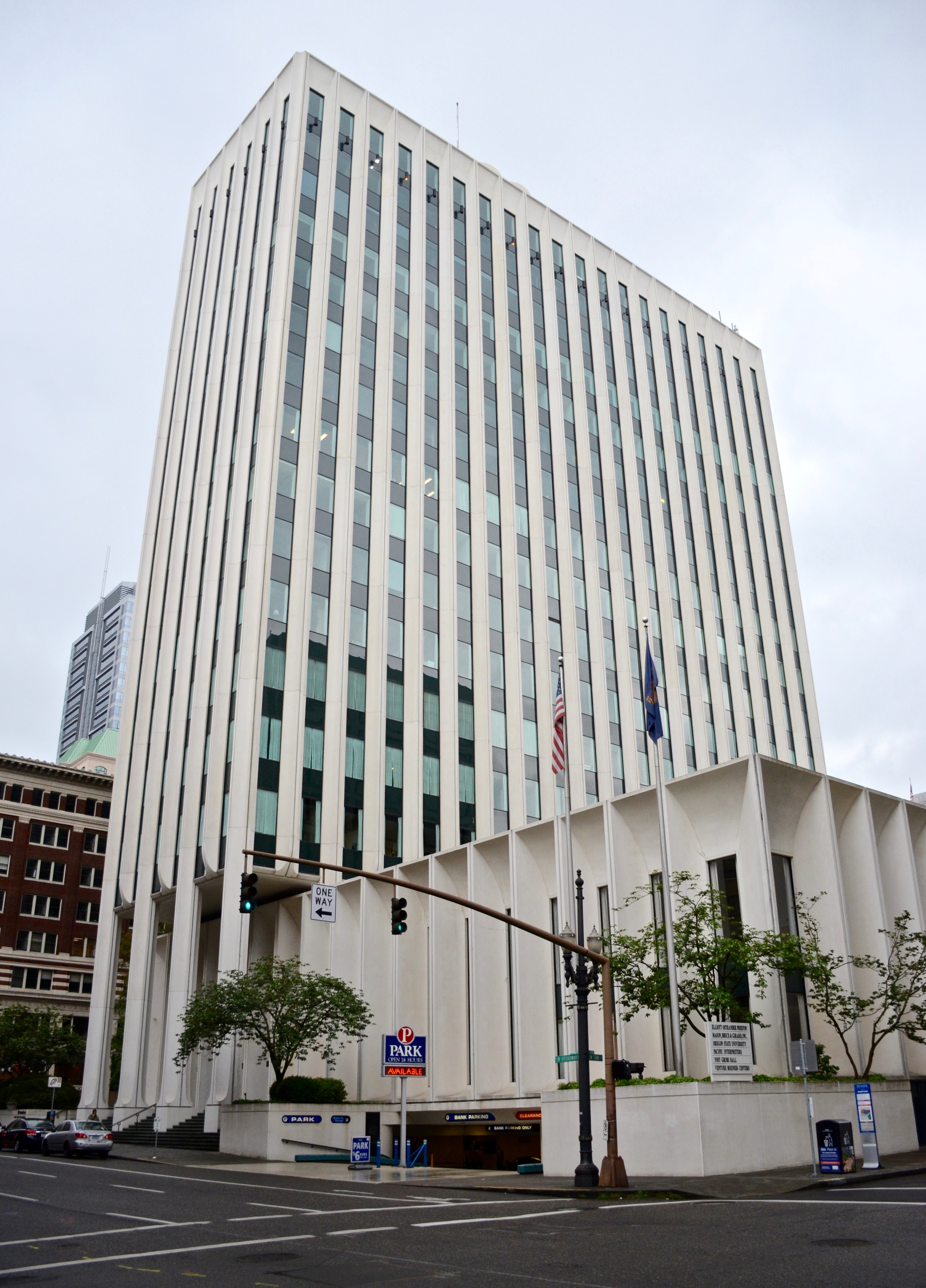
- OnPoint Plaza in Downtown Portland, Oregon
- Type: Credit union
- Industry: Financial services
- Founded: 1932
- Headquarters: OnPoint Plaza, Portland, Oregon, United States
- Number of locations: 59
- Area served: 30 counties in Oregon and Southwest Washington
- Key people: Robert Stuart, President/CEO board of directors Katherine Durham, Chairman; Keith Thomajan, Vice chairman Darren Nakata, Secretary; Greg Chandler, Director; Melissa Damm, Director; Matt Mroczek, Director; Amy Slagle, Director; Felicia Tripp, Director; Margaret "Peggy" Willer, Director
- Products: Savings; checking; consumer loans; mortgages; credit cards; online banking; car loan; home loan, solar loans
- Total assets: $9.4 Billion USD (2022)
- Website: www.onpointcu.com

OnPoint Community Credit Union, (colloquially OnPoint), is an American credit union based and headquartered in Portland, Oregon. It operates 59 branches throughout Oregon and Southwest Washington with $9.54 billion in assets and 637,000+ members.

== Membership ==
OnPoint is owned and governed by its members and like all credit unions has a field of membership that designates who may join. To qualify for membership one must live or work in one of OnPoint's 32 membership counties in Oregon or SW Washington.

== History ==
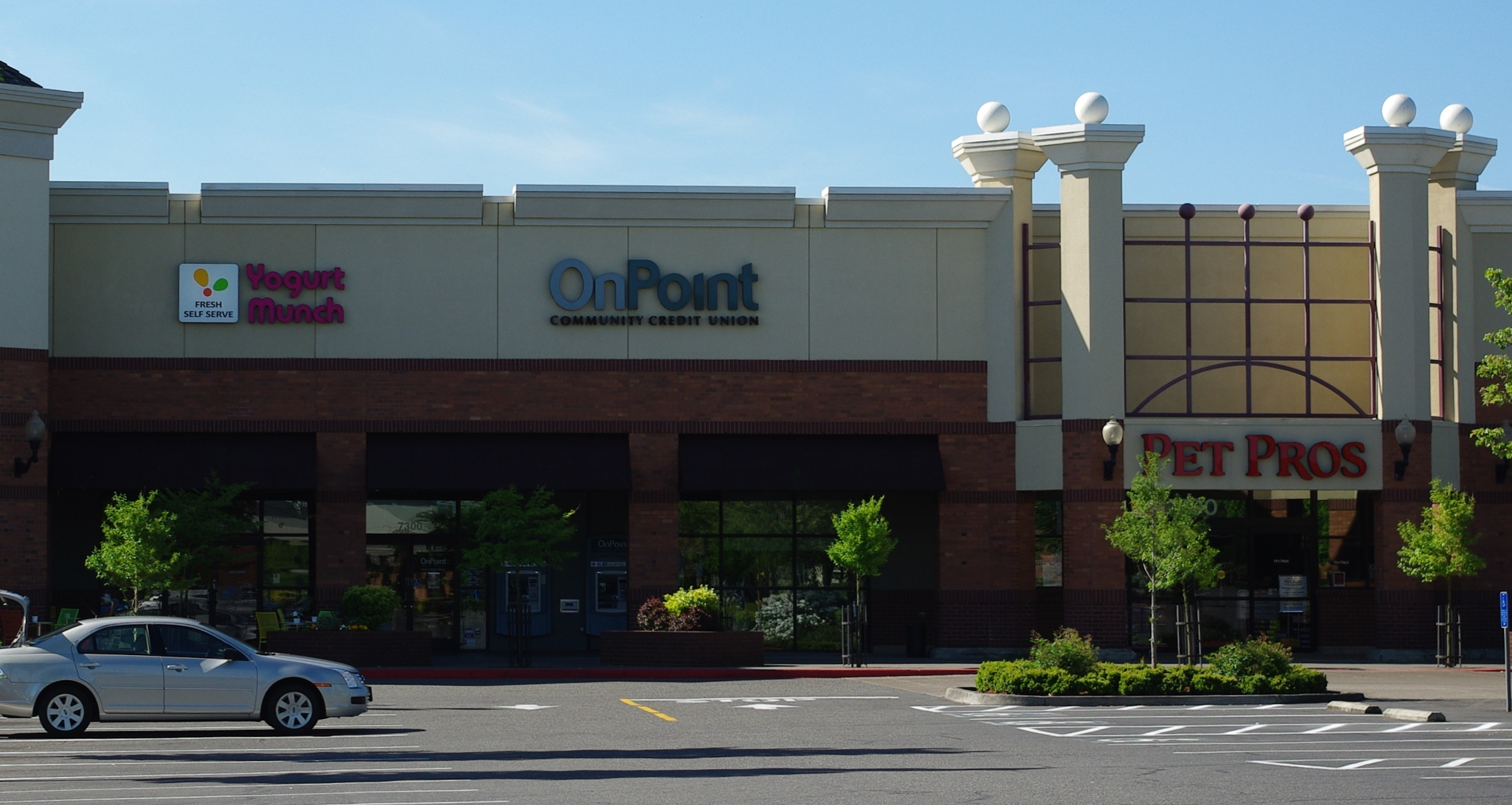
An OnPoint branch in Hillsboro, Oregon

OnPoint was founded in 1932 as Portland Teacher's Credit Union by a group of 16 Portland Public Schools teachers.

In 2003, the credit union considered merging with Oregon Community Credit Union. The merger, which would have been the largest in credit union history, was approved by the boards of both credit unions and was given regulatory approval by the FTC and the NCUA. The merger fell apart in June 2004. While compensation issues such as then-CEO Cliff Dias's $1.6 million salary were cited as possible reasons for the failed merger, the credit unions cited philosophical differences, stating that they could not agree on which products or system to use.

In 2005, Portland Teacher's Credit Union was granted a community charter in Oregon and Southwest Washington, thereby expanding membership eligibility. They changed their name to OnPoint Community Credit Union.

In 2021, OnPoint struck a deal with the retailer Fred Meyer, allowing them to open branches within 20 of their stores throughout the Portland metropolitan area.

In April 2026, OnPoint purchased the naming rights to the former UnionBank Tower in Downtown Portland, which is now known as OnPoint Plaza. OnPoint opened a branch and moved some of their offices to the building.
