= Bank of California Building (Portland, Oregon) =

Historic former bank building in Portland, Oregon, U.S.

- U.S. National Register of Historic Places
- Portland Historic Landmark
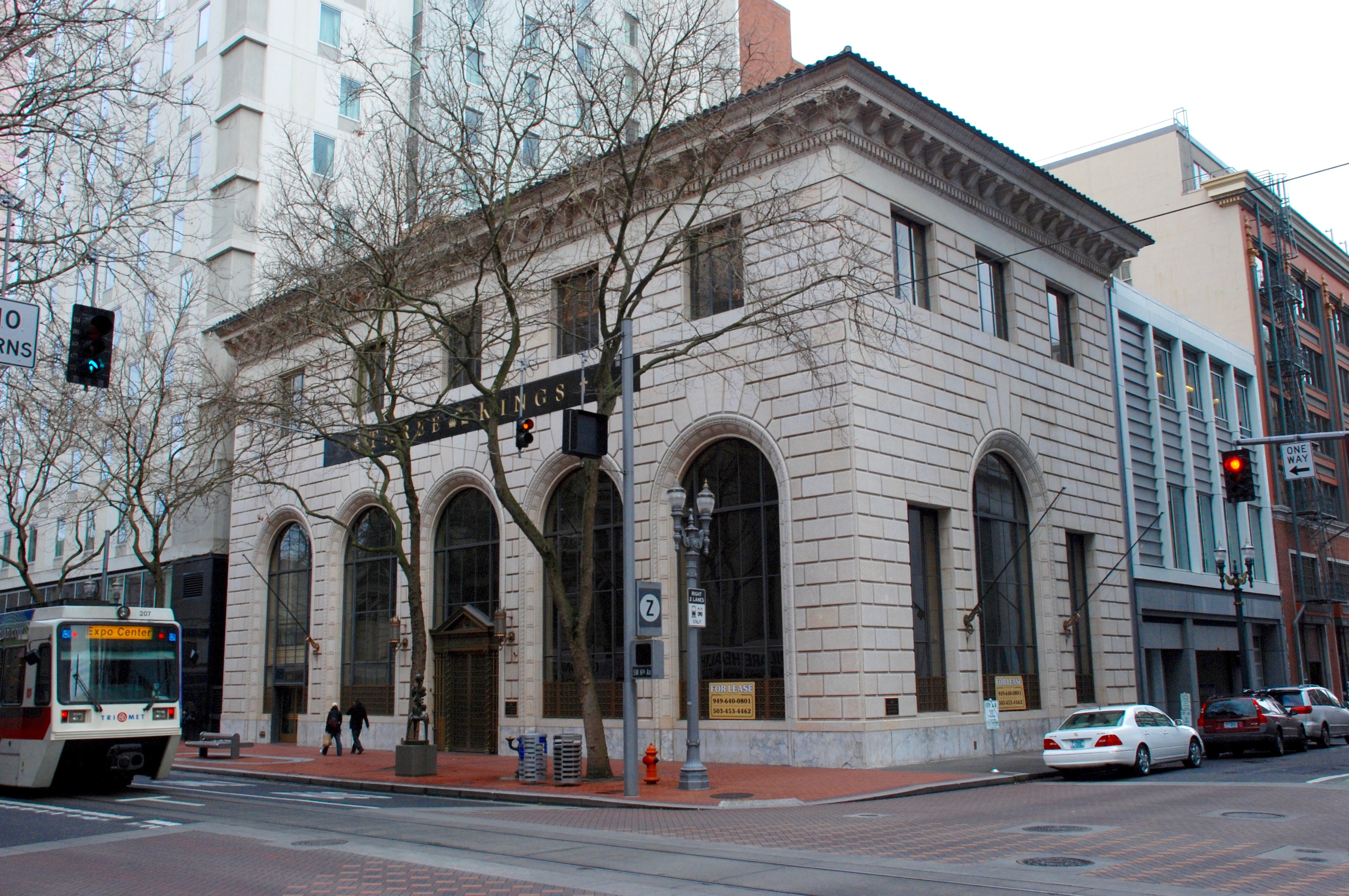
- Viewed from the southwest in 2013

- Location within Portland, Oregon Location within Oregon Location within the United States
- Location: 330 SW 6th Avenue; Portland, Oregon, U.S.
- Coordinates: 45°31′16″N 122°40′38″W
- Area: 0.1 acres (0.040 ha)
- Built: 1924–25
- Architect: A. E. Doyle
- Architectural style: Italianate
- NRHP reference No.: 78002306
- Added to NRHP: March 14, 1978

The Bank of California Building, also known as the Durham & Bates Building and currently the Three Kings Building, is a historic former bank building in downtown Portland, Oregon, United States. It has been on the National Register of Historic Places since 1978. The three-story building was designed by A. E. Doyle in an Italianate style and completed in 1925. The ground floor features a two-story-high grand room with 36-foot (11 m) ceilings. The building's original owner and occupant, the Bank of California, moved out around the end of 1969 and sold the building in 1970. It was last used as a bank in 1977. It is currently owned by Surlamer Investments.

== Establishment and original use ==
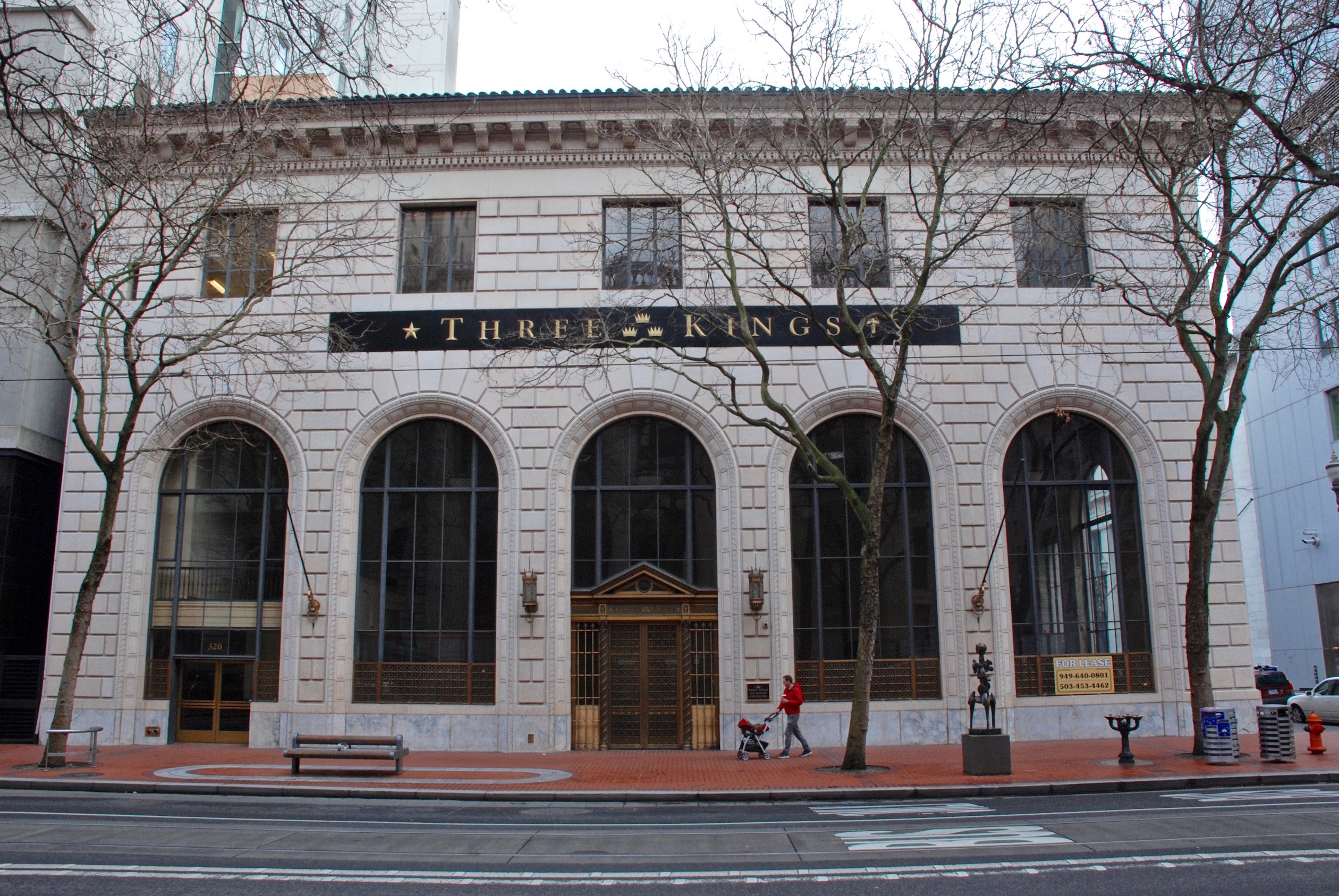
An elevation of the main (west) façade in 2013. The entrance at the far left was a 1977 addition.

The London and San Francisco Bank established a Portland branch in 1882. When the San Francisco-based Bank of California acquired and absorbed that institution in 1905, the branch became the first Bank of California branch in Portland. In 1924, officers of the bank approved plans to construct a new building for the Portland branch. Since about 1894, it had been located at Third and Stark Streets in downtown, in the Chamber of Commerce Building (demolished in 1934). Noted Portland architect A. E. Doyle was hired to design the new structure. Doyle's chief designer Charles K. Greene had traveled abroad to study Greco-Roman architectural forms in the 1910s.

His research resulted in three Italianate buildings in Portland, of which the Bank of California Building was the first. The others were the Chicago/Italianate Pacific Building and the Public Service Building, an early skyscraper. While the Pacific and Public Service Buildings are large, multi-story structures, the three-story Bank of California Building is small. It has been described as being in the style of an Italian Renaissance palazzo (palace). Construction began in 1924, the building was completed in 1925 and opened on July 20 of that year.

== Description ==
=== Exterior ===
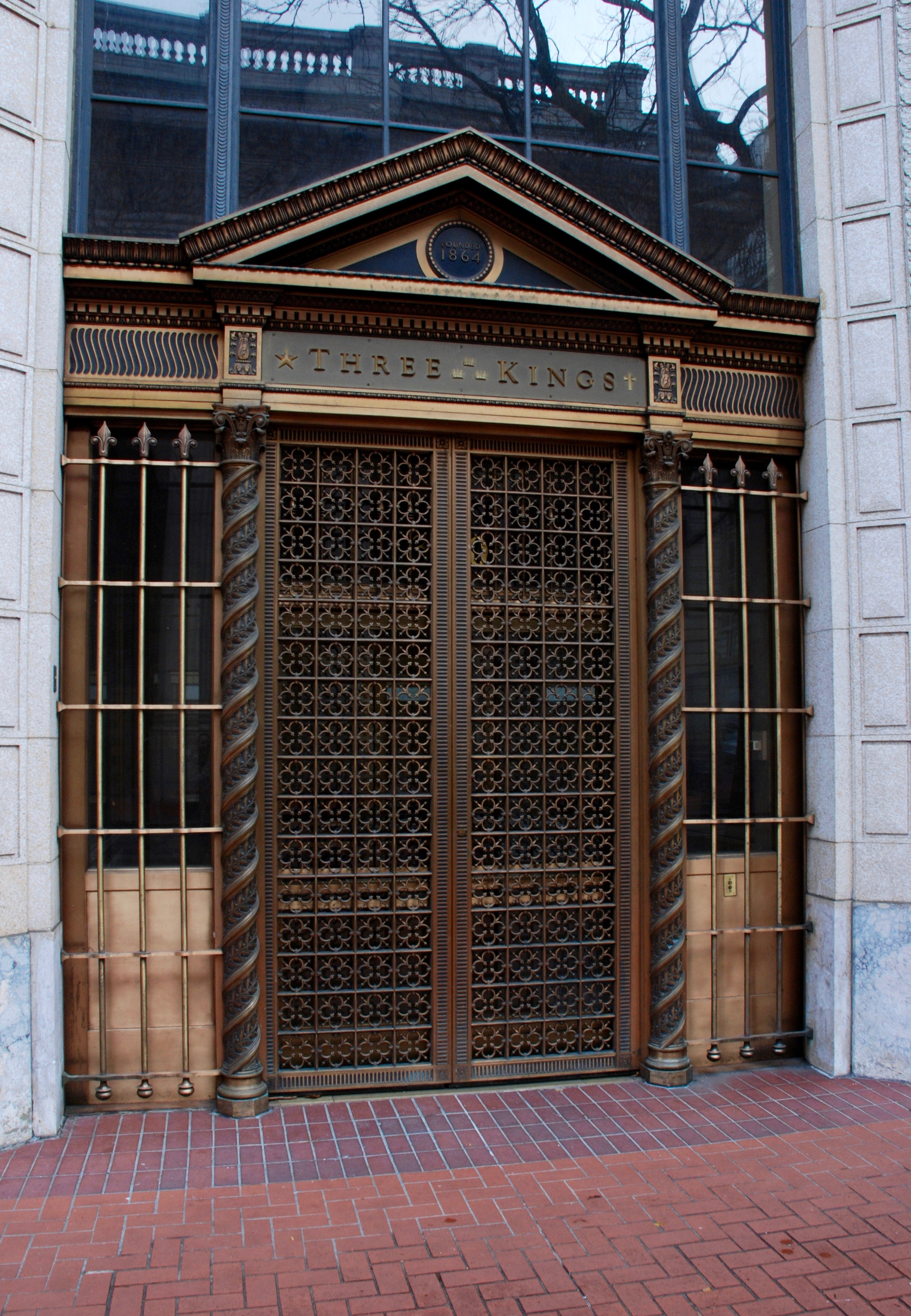
The central, original entrance features ornate bronzework on and around the gates covering the doors.

The building occupies a 50-by-100-foot (15 m × 30 m) site at the northeast corner of 6th Avenue and Stark Streets; it faces 6th. The main façade features five large, 28-foot (8.5 m) tall windows which are arched at the top. Above each is a smaller rectangular window at the second-floor level. The third floor is within the building's hipped roof and is windowless. The exterior is clad in cast terracotta with marble trim, and the roof is covered in red clay tiles. Terracotta is also used for the cornices. Two ornate bronze lamps flank the central entrance, similar in style to fixtures used on Portland's Doyle-designed Public Service Building of the same period. A bronze portico frames the bronze gates of the main entrance, located in the central arch of the five tall arches. For many years, this was the building's only entrance. However, in 1977, during work to modify the building for non-banking uses, a second entrance was built in the northernmost arch of the main façade, accessing a new, smaller lobby and providing more direct access to the upper floors, .

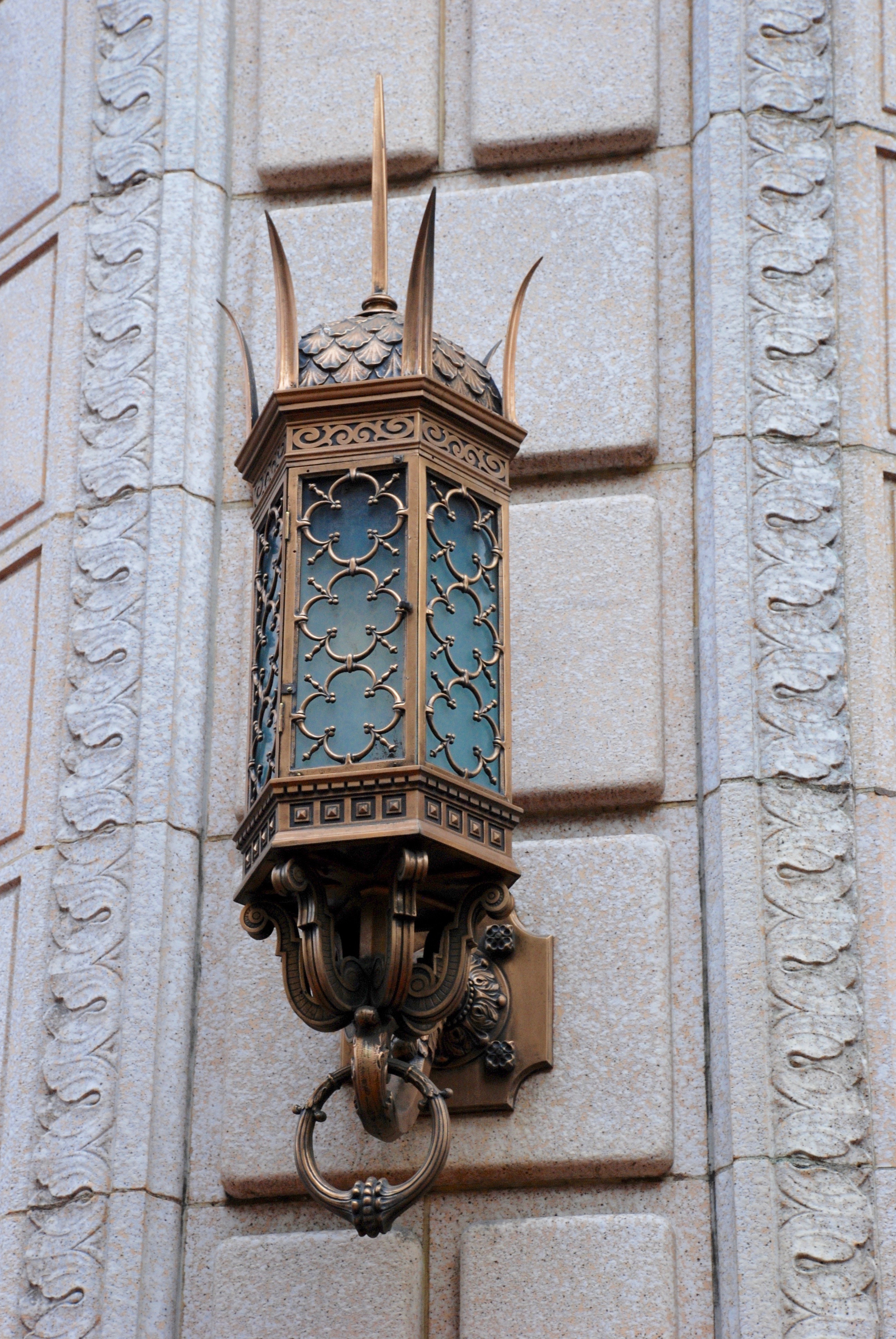
One of two bronze lanterns flanking the main entrance

Originally, the building's north side was directly adjacent to the six-story Fenton Building (also known as the Guaranty Building), obscured from view, and was not given any decorative surface when built. However, following that building's demolition in 1971, the Bank of California Building's newly exposed north façade was resurfaced in cast terracotta in a pattern simulating that of the west and south façades. A surface parking lot took the Fenton Building's place, and a drive-up teller window was added to the building's north end; this addition was the only substantial alteration to the building's exterior between its completion in 1925 and its nomination to the National Register in 1978. The drive-up window was removed in 1977, after the building's use as a bank ended. In 1980, the parking lot gave way to a new 13-story office building known as the TN Building. It was converted into a 16-story hotel in 2008, the Marriott-owned Courtyard Portland City Center, leaving the north façade hidden from view again.

=== Interior ===
In addition to three main floors, the building has a mezzanine situated between the first (ground) and second floors. At the time of the building's opening in 1925, the windowless third floor was not fully outfitted for use, and was planned to be "held in reserve" until then-anticipated expansion of the bank's business in Portland created a need for additional work space. It was eventually equipped "as a lounge, library, and recreation space for the bank's employees". A basement was also included. It housed the bank vaults (of which there are three), among other facilities. The ground floor was occupied by the main banking room, with a line of teller windows along the east side. It was designed as a "grand two-story room with ornate coffered beam ceilings", which are 36 feet (11 m) high. The mezzanine was originally situated only along the north side and is 16 feet (4.9 m) wide there. The floor of the former banking lobby is marble, as were the teller counters (since removed). Most other interior surfaces are cast materials made to simulate travertine marble.

Along with removal of the line of teller windows, other work undertaken during the 1977 modifications included an extension of the mezzanine southwards along the east wall to the south wall, and the addition of a freestanding stairway between it and the center of the ground-floor lobby.

=== Immediate surroundings ===
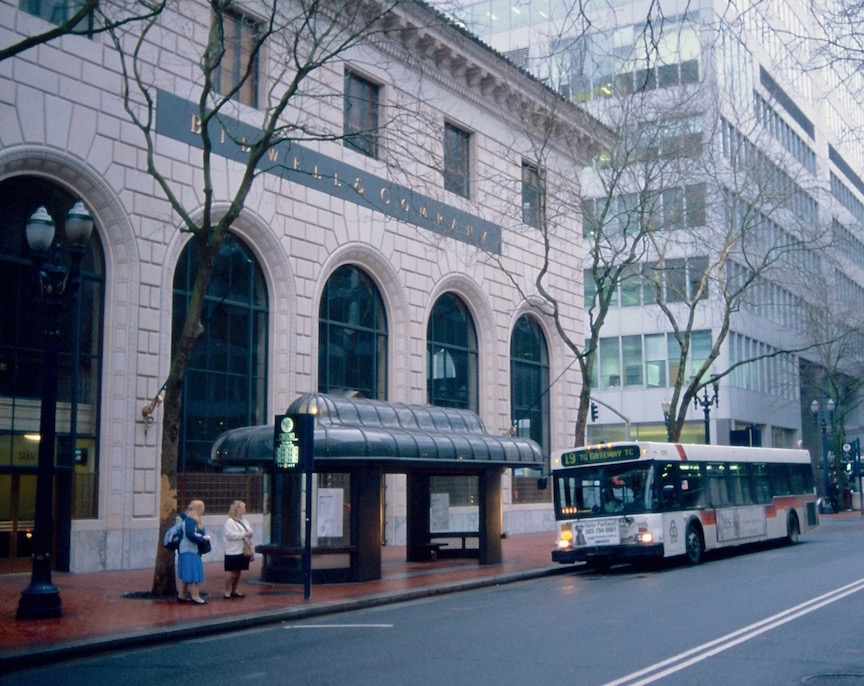
Pictured shortly before its removal in 2007 is a large Portland Mall bus-stop shelter that stood in front of the building for 30 years. The lettering on the main façade at that time was for Bidwell & Co. (which had moved out in 2004).

The northbound Portland Transit Mall passes in front of the building. During the mall's construction in 1976–77 the plain cement sidewalk in front of the building was resurfaced in brick, and street trees were added. A large shelter for the new bus stop that was installed there at that time was removed when the mall was rebuilt in 2007–08. MAX light rail trains have passed in front of the building since 2009. Since completion of a renovation of the transit mall in 2009, the bronze sculpture Talos No. 2 has stood in front of the building, near the corner of 6th and Stark. The Bank of California Building stands directly across 6th Avenue from another A. E. Doyle-designed bank building, the United States National Bank Building, of 1917. That building's classical style contrasts sharply with the Bank of California Building's Italianate design.

== Post-1960s owners or primary tenants ==
The Bank of California remained at the site for almost 45 years until moving west by just over one block to a new 15-story high-rise building in December 1969. It also took the name Bank of California Building, or tower and was renamed the Union Bank of California Building after a 1996 merger. It was then occupied, in turn, by Security Bank of Oregon, the Oregon Bank, and insurance company Durham & Bates, Inc. The end of the building's use as a bank took place around 1977, when it was sold to Bankside Investors, to be leased to Durham & Bates. The prominent lettering on the main façade was usually changed with each transfer, being altered to read SECURITY BANK OF OREGON in 1970 and to read DURHAM & BATES after that company moved into the building. The structure was added to the National Register of Historic Places in March 1978.

Bidwell & Company, a Portland-based stock brokerage firm, purchased the building in November 1999 and launched an intensive nine-month renovation in 2000. Bidwell moved into the building in November 2000. However, after the company was sold to TD Ameritrade in 2004, the building was vacated and sold. In 2008, the building was renamed the Three Kings Building, with the signage replaced as such.

== See also ==
- Architecture of Portland, Oregon
- National Register of Historic Places listings in Southwest Portland, Oregon
