= Public Service Building (Portland, Oregon) =

Historic building in Portland, Oregon, U.S.

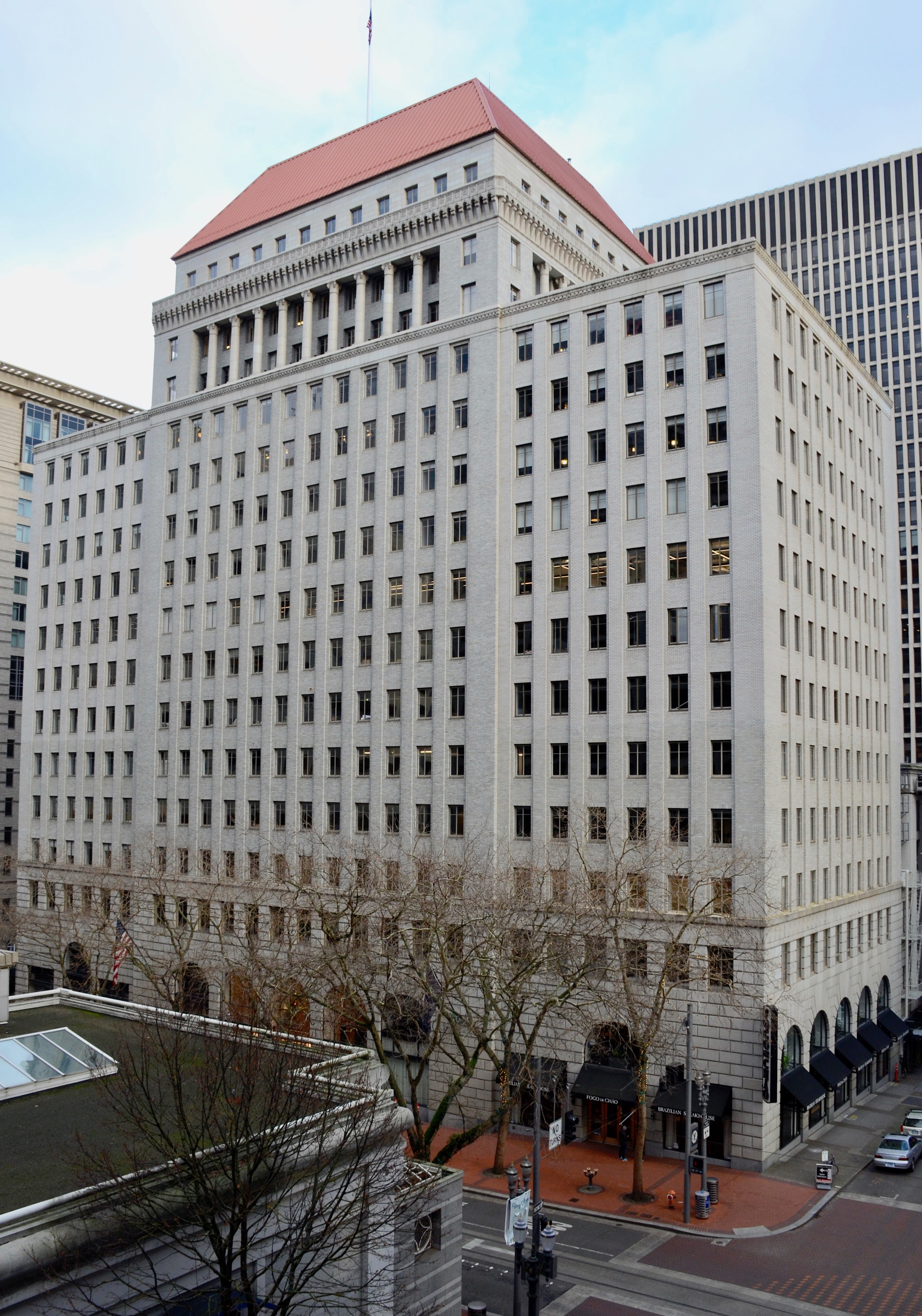
- The Public Service Building as seen from the west in 2018

- Location within Portland, Oregon

General information
- Type: Commercial offices
- Location: 920 SW Sixth Avenue; Portland, Oregon
- Coordinates: 45.51727°N 122.67919°W
- Completed: 1927

Height
- Roof: 67.06 m (220.0 ft)

Technical details
- Floor count: 15
- Floor area: 21,442 m^{2} (230,800 sq ft)

Design and construction
- Architects: A.E. Doyle & Associates
- Public Service Building and Garage
- U.S. National Register of Historic Places
- Portland Historic Landmark
- Architectural style: Italianate
- NRHP reference No.: 96000998
- Added to NRHP: September 12, 1996

The Public Service Building is a historic 67.06 m (220.0 ft), 15-story office building in downtown Portland, Oregon, United States. The building and its attached parking garage have been listed on the National Register of Historic Places as the Public Service Building and Garage since 1996. It was built to house the offices of the Portland Gas and Coke Company and the Pacific Power and Light Company. The building's name reflects the fact that these utilities were "public services". A space in the Public Service Building fronting the corner of Salmon and Sixth streets became the first Niketown store.

== Structural details ==
The north and south wings of the building were originally two stories tall, but were built up to their present height of 12 stories in 1957. Considered a skyscraper, once complete, the Public Service Building became the tallest building in Portland, holding that record until the 1960s. It was overtaken by the Hilton Portland Hotel in August 1962, when that building reached 229 feet (70 m).

The main power plant for the city was once located in the basement. The space is now used to house the city's main power feeds.

== Architectural details ==
The Public Service Building was the third of three similarly Italianate buildings built in Portland by the firm of prolific local architect A.E. Doyle. The project's primary designer, Charles K. Greene, worked on the other Italianate Doyle-commissioned buildings in Portland: the smaller Bank of California Building (1924) and the Pacific Building (1926). Green initiated the design of this structure, but left Portland before the building was complete. Pietro Belluschi then completed the project.

The first three floors of the Public Service Building are faced with gray terra-cotta, and the upper floors in gray brick. The cornices and details are also terra-cotta. The building has a stylized wave motif that can be seen along its moldings. The original roof, like its sister buildings, was clad in red clay tile. Pietro Belluschi's touch can be seen in the building lobby, where he designed elevator doors that represented the utility company tenants.

Taking advantage of its being the tallest building in town, the utility companies added neon signs atop the roof: "POWER", "HEAT", "GAS", and "LIGHT", each aimed in a cardinal direction. At some point all four sides of this sign said "PACIFIC POWER".

A.E. Doyle died in January 1928, only three weeks after the Public Service Building opened.

== Renovations ==
Renovations to the Public Service Building took place in 1957, 1973, and 1999. The 1957 renovation raised the height of the building's wings to 12 floors. In 1973, the neon signs and original roofs were removed, and a new metal roof installed. The 1999 renovations focused on reducing energy costs with new technology, costing around $20 million.

The building was sold in 1993 to the Goodman Family, also owners of parking garages and lots in Portland, for $3 million.

== Notable tenants ==
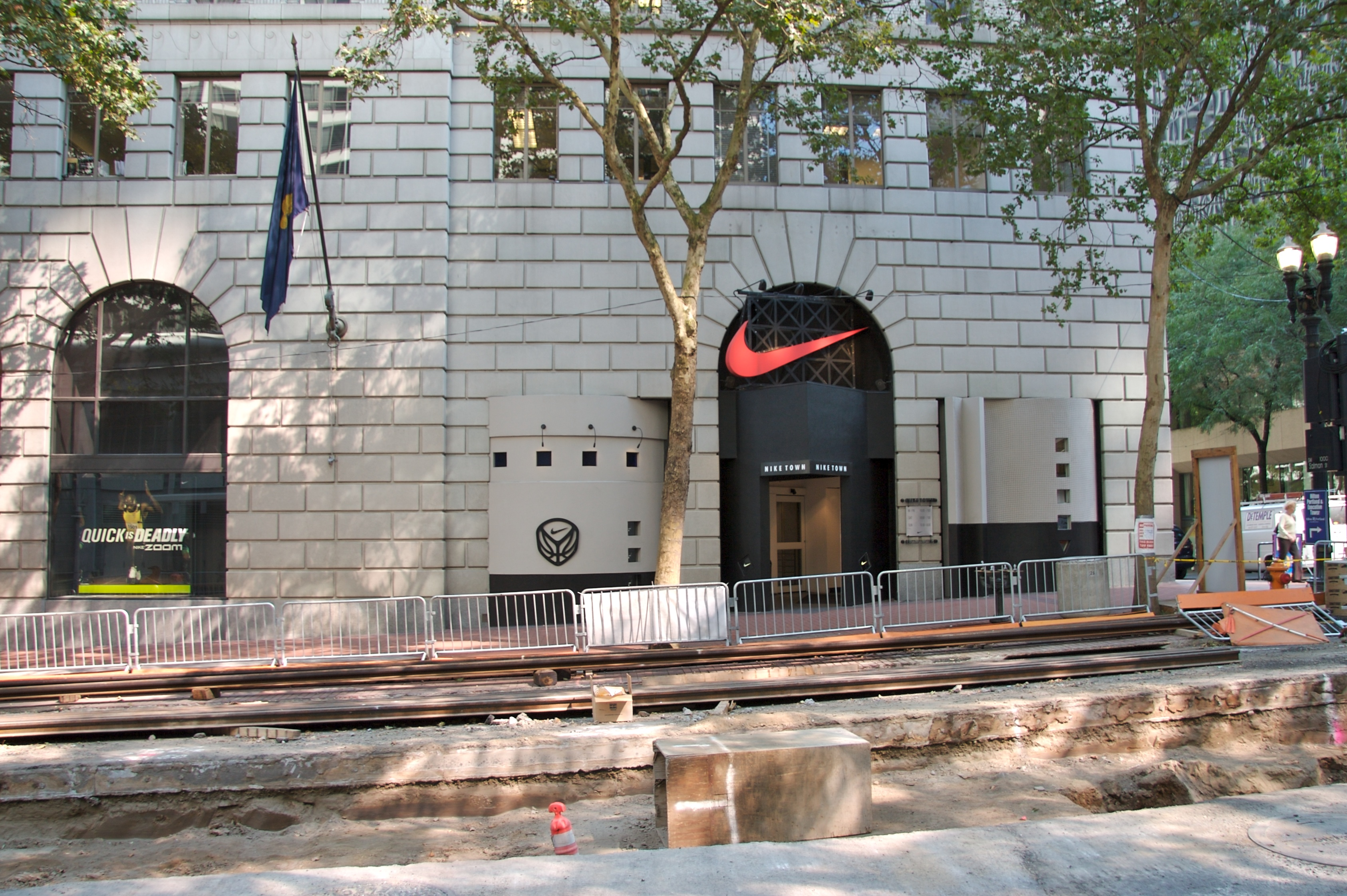
The Niketown store in 2007, during light-rail construction on the transit mall. The store moved to another location in 2011.

The first Nike retail store to be opened anywhere was located in the ground floor of the Public Service Building, at the corner of 6th and Salmon. Known as Niketown, a name later used for additional Nike stores in other major cities, it opened in November 1990. It closed at this location 21 years later, in October 2011, moving to a different location in downtown Portland.

== See also ==
- Architecture of Portland, Oregon
- National Register of Historic Places listings in Southwest Portland, Oregon
