= James Lee Hansen =

American sculptor (born 1925)

- Born: June 13, 1925 (age 101); Tacoma, Washington, U.S.
- Known for: Sculpture

James Lee Hansen (born June 13, 1925) is an American sculptor.

== Early life ==
Hansen was born in Tacoma, Washington on June 13, 1925.

== Works ==
- Talos (1964), Fulton Mall, Fresno, California
- The Guardian (1965)
- Glyph Singer No. 3 (1976), Vancouver, Washington
- Winter Rider No. 2, Portland, Oregon
