= A. E. Doyle =

American architect (1877–1928)

- Born: Albert Ernest Doyle; July 27, 1877; Santa Cruz, California
- Died: January 23, 1928 (aged 50); Portland, Oregon
- Occupation: Architect
- Spouse: Lucie Godley Doyle
- Children: four

Albert Ernest Doyle (July 27, 1877 – January 23, 1928) was a prolific architect in the U.S. states of Oregon and Washington. He opened his own architectural practice in 1907. From 1908 to 1914, he partnered with William B. Patterson, and their firm was known as Doyle & Patterson.

== Biography ==
Doyle was born in Santa Cruz, California, and moved with his family at a very young age to Portland, Oregon, where he married Lucie Godley (1877–1953) and ultimately established his architectural practice. He began an apprenticeship with the firm of Whidden & Lewis in 1893 and remained until 1906, with the exception of two years in New York with the office of Henry Bacon. While with Whidden & Lewis he may have substantially designed the Forestry Building of the Lewis and Clark Centennial Exposition. While with Henry Bacon, he attended architectural classes at, but was not enrolled in, Columbia University. From April to December 1906, he made a "grand tour" of Europe.

After returning to Portland, he opened his own practice, in 1907. After securing the commission for a major addition to the Meier & Frank store, he formed a partnership with architect William B. Patterson, in 1908. The firm, Doyle & Patterson, lasted until 1914. Patterson served as the engineer and superintendent for the firm. When work dried up in 1914, the partnership dissolved and Doyle again practiced on his own as A.E. Doyle, Architect.

Doyle & Patterson's Revival- and Italianate-style works set the tone for other commercial buildings in Portland, especially the use of glazed terra-cotta. A series of residential cabins along the Oregon and Washington coasts inspired a regional style that was widely emulated in the 1930s. Doyle also designed Portland's iconic public drinking fountains known as Benson Bubblers.

Another extremely prominent project that Doyle was tapped to build was the fledgling Reed College campus. Competition to design Reed College was fierce and many of the city's top architects made bids. On January 5, 1911, the Reed Trustees announced that Doyle & Patterson had been elected unanimously. Doyle envisioned a large college of Gothic-inspired dormitories and grassy quadrangles. Early plans, and numerous conferences with the college's then-president, William T. Foster, led to two quintessential Doyle creations: the Reed College Hall of Arts and Science, now Eliot Hall, and a dormitory originally envisioned to house the college's male population, now commonly referred to as Old Dorm Block.

Unbuilt works include additions to the now-demolished Portland Hotel (currently the site of Pioneer Courthouse Square) and to the Doyle-designed U.S. National Bank Building. Doyle also drew up an original design for the Equitable Building which called for an Art Deco skyscraper design. The building ended up being built after World War II by Pietro Belluschi in its noted and early International Style design.

Doyle is sometimes credited with the design for Timberline Lodge on Mount Hood near Government Camp, Oregon, but he was merely one of several architects solicited to draw up plans for the building, which ended up being designed by Forest Service architects.

In the 1920s, Doyle's firm had a second period of growth. In 1925, Doyle hired the young Pietro Belluschi.

Doyle died in Portland on January 23, 1928, of Bright's disease. The firm continued as A.E. Doyle & Associates until 1943, when the name was changed to Pietro Belluschi, Architect.

Doyle's collection of architecture books and some personal papers was purchased by Reed College in 1992.

== Work ==
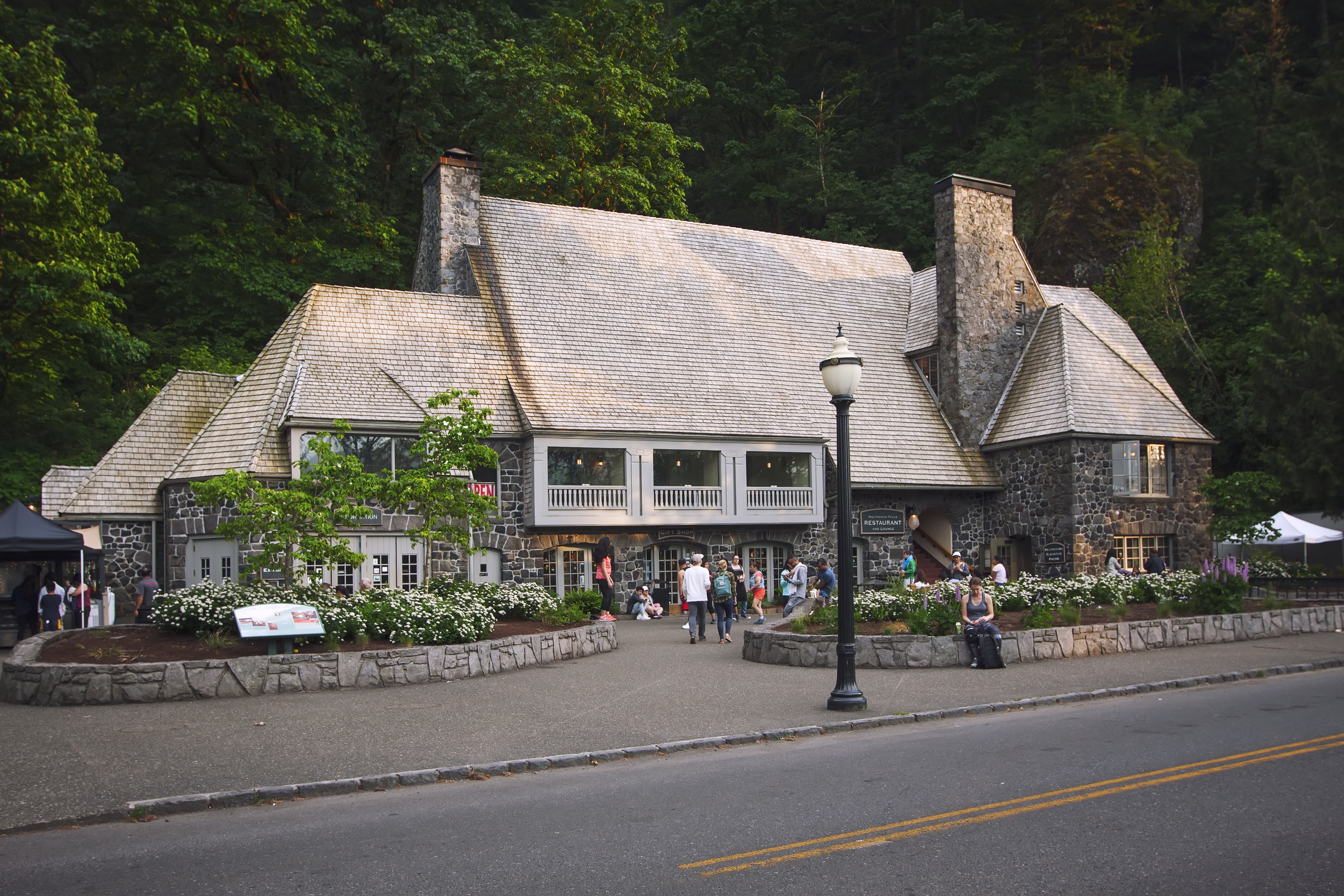
Multnomah Falls Lodge

Buildings marked (NRHP) are on the National Register of Historic Places. As of 2008, 37 of Doyle's buildings are on the National Register.

=== Bridal Veil, Oregon ===
- Multnomah Falls Lodge (NRHP)

=== Corvallis, Oregon ===
- Corvallis Public Library

=== Eugene, Oregon ===
- Oregon Electric Station (NRHP)

=== Hood River, Oregon ===
- Butler Bank (NRHP)

=== Manzanita, Oregon ===
- A. E. Doyle Cottage (NRHP)
- Mary Frances Isom Cottage (NRHP)
- Harry F. Wentz Studio (NRHP)

=== Portland, Oregon ===
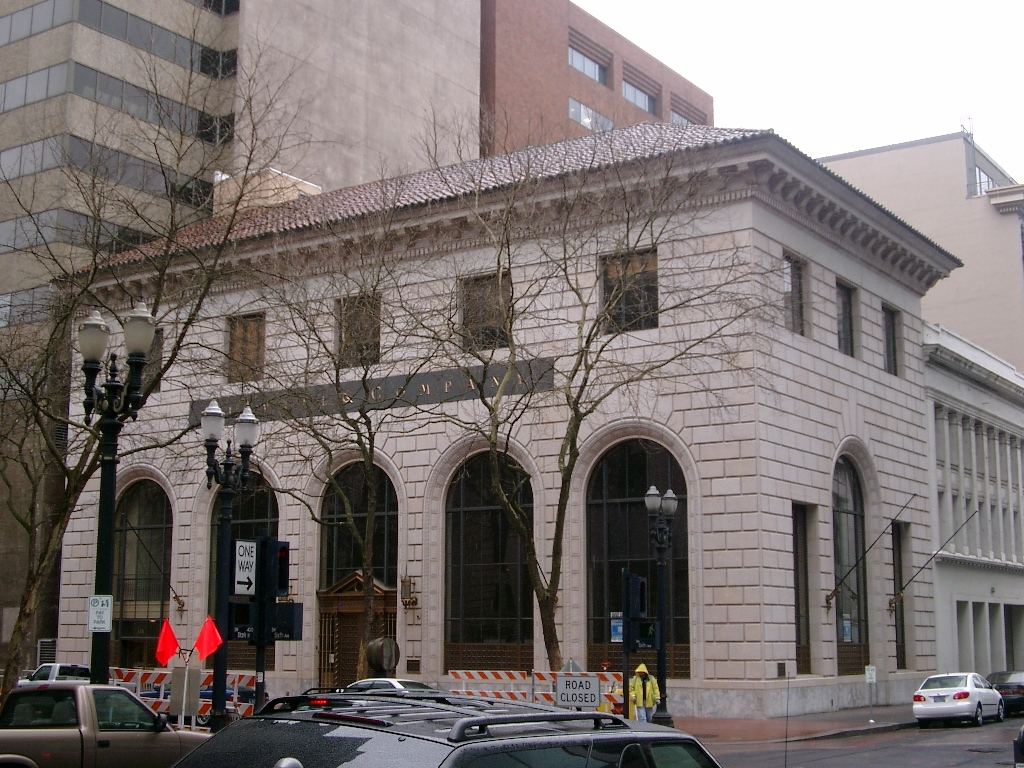
Bank of California Building in 2007

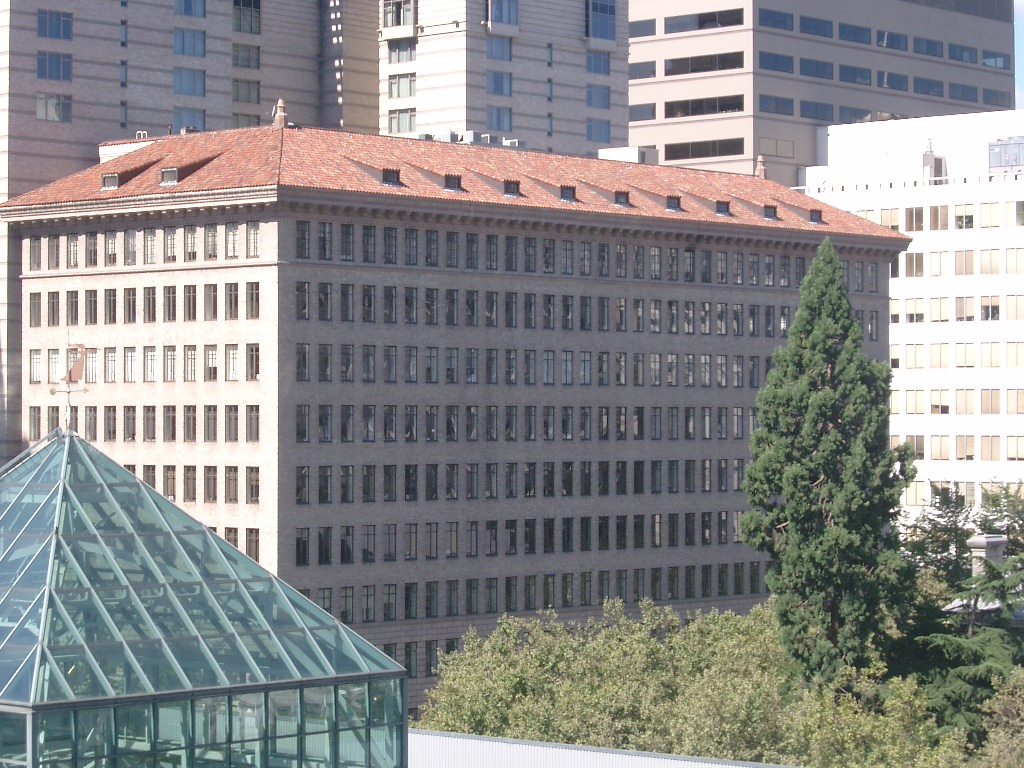
Doyle's Pacific Building in Portland, Oregon

- Ball–Ehrman House (NRHP)
- Bank of California Building (now known as the Three Kings Building) (NRHP)
- Bedell Building (NRHP)
- Benson Hotel (NRHP)
- Burke-Clark House (NRHP)
- Civic Stadium (now Providence Park, formerly JeldWen Field and PGE Park)
- Cora Bryant Wheeler House (NRHP)
- Corbett Brothers Auto Storage Garage (NRHP)
- Dr. Herbert S. Nichols House (NRHP)
- East Portland Branch, Public Library of Multnomah County (NRHP)
- Frank J. and Maude Louise Cobbs Estate (NRHP)
- Gaston–Strong House (NRHP)
- Glencoe Elementary
- H. Russell Albee House (NRHP)
- Hazelwood Creamery / Leftbank
- J. G. Edwards House (NRHP)
- Joseph R. Bowles House (NRHP)
- Lipman–Wolfe and Company Building (now Hotel Monaco) (NRHP)
- Meier & Frank Building (first Doyle & Patterson commission) (NRHP)
- Montgomery Court (1916, 1925), now a Portland State University residence hall
- Morgan Building (NRHP)
- Harmon–Neils House (NRHP)
- Multnomah County Central Library (NRHP)
- Neighborhood House (NRHP)
- Northwestern National Bank Building (American Bank Building) (NRHP)
- Oregon National Building (NRHP)
- Pacific Building (Pietro Belluschi's first project with the firm) (NRHP)
- Pittock Block (NRHP)
- Public Service Building (NRHP)
- Reed College campus, including Eliot Hall
- Riverdale Grade School
- Terminal Sales Building
- United States National Bank Building (NRHP)
- W. B. Ayer House (NRHP)
- Woodlark Building

=== Goldendale, Washington ===
- Goldendale Free Public Library (NRHP)

=== Seattle ===
- J.S. Graham Store (aka Doyle Building) (NRHP) (image)
