= Bowles House =

Bowles House may refer to:

in the United States

(by state)

- Bowles Hall, Berkeley, CA, a dormitory house at University of California, Berkeley, that is listed on the NRHP in California
- Bowles-Cooley House, Aspen, CO, listed on the NRHP in Colorado
- Bowles House (Westminster, Colorado), listed on the NRHP in Colorado
- Joseph R. Bowles House, Portland, OR, listed on the NRHP in Oregon
- Jesse C. Bowles House, Seattle, WA, listed on the NRHP in Washington
