= Corkish =

Corkish is a surname of Manx origin. Notable people with the surname include:

- Geoff Corkish (1953–2025), Manx politician
- Jamie Lynn Corkish (born 1984), American sport shooter

== See also ==
- Corkish Apartments, Portland, Oregon, United States
