= Doyle & Patterson =

American architectural firm

Doyle & Patterson was an American architectural firm in Portland, Oregon, from 1908 until 1914. It was a partnership of the prolific architect Albert Ernest Doyle (1877–1928) and the architect William B. Patterson.

== History ==
The firm was founded upon receipt of a commission for the Meier and Frank Building in Portland. The firm lasted until 1914. Patterson was the engineer and superintendent for the firm. With the addition of the engineer James George Beach, a son-in-law of prominent businessman Simon Benson, in 1911, the firm briefly became Doyle, Patterson & Beach, but Beach left in 1912 and the firm's name reverted to Doyle & Patterson. When less work was available in 1914, the partnership dissolved, and by 1915 Doyle was again working alone.

== Works ==
A number of works are listed on the National Register of Historic Places (NRHP).

Portland

- Benson Hotel, 309 SW Broadway, (Doyle, Patterson & Beach), NRHP
- East Portland Branch, Public Library of Multnomah County, 1110 SE Alder, (Doyle, Patterson & Beach), NRHP
- Harmon-Neils House, 2642 NW Lovejoy St, (Doyle & Patterson), NRHP
- Lipman–Wolfe and Company Building, 521 SW 5th Ave, (Doyle & Patterson), NRHP
- Meier and Frank Building, 621 SW 5th Ave, (Doyle & Patterson), NRHP
- Morgan Building, 720 SW Washington St, (Doyle, Patterson & Beach), NRHP
- Northwestern National Bank Building, 621 SW Morrison St, (Doyle & Patterson), NRHP
- Pittock Block, 921 SW Washington St, (Doyle & Patterson), NRHP
- Selling Building (later named the Oregon National Building), 610 SW Alder St, (Doyle & Patterson), NRHP
- Woodlark Building, 813–817 SW Alder St, (Doyle, Patterson & Beach), NRHP

Other cities

- Goldendale Free Public Library, 131 W Burgen St, Goldendale, Washington (Doyle & Patterson), NRHP
- Oregon Electric Railway Passenger Station, 27 E 5th St, Eugene, Oregon (Doyle, Patterson & Beach), NRHP
