= Shift Drinks =

Defunct cocktail bar in Portland, Oregon, U.S.

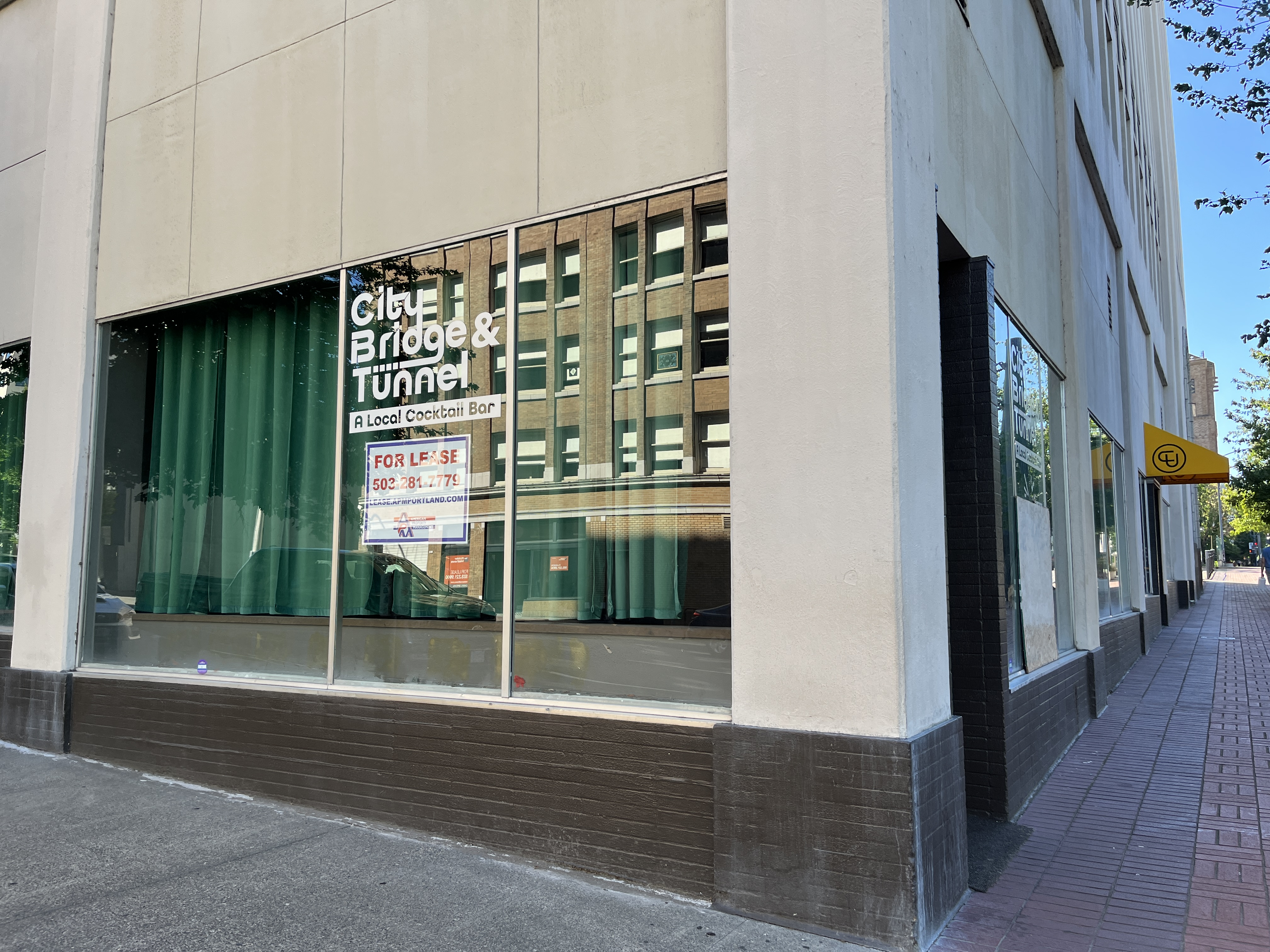
- 2023 photograph of the space which previously housed Shift Drinks
- Interactive map of Shift Drinks

Restaurant information
- Location: 1200 SW Morrison Street, Portland, Oregon, 97205, United States
- Coordinates: 45°31′13.8″N 122°41′4″W
- Website: shiftdrinkspdx.com

Shift Drinks was a cocktail bar in Portland, Oregon. The bar opened in 2015 and closed in 2020, during the COVID-19 pandemic.

== Description ==
Shift Drinks' interior was described as "spacious and minimalist". Willamette Week Matthew Korfhage said the "monochromatic, airy space is an exercise in minimalism and knowing ironies, down to the giant black-and-white photo of drunken Batman, or another of a beautiful woman having a drink thrown in her face".

The cocktail bar had a wine list with approximately 100 bottles. The food menu included grilled cheese with tomato soup and drink options included the Tijuana Pipe Dream and a collaboration with StormBreaker Brewing on a single-hop pale ale called ShiftBeer.

== History ==
The bar opened in the Terminal Sales Building on May 18, 2015. Anthony Garcia was a co-owner, along with his wife Anne Garcia and Alise Moffat, a chef and bartender, respectively.

For approximately 11 months of 2015–2016, the upstairs area hosted the restaurant Nomad.PDX. In May 2016, Shift branded the area as Makeshift Room for hosting private events. The bar began offering free dinners on Sundays in 2016, followed by all-day happy hour in 2017.

Shift closed permanently in mid 2020, during the COVID-19 pandemic, and was replaced by the bar and restaurant City Bridge & Tunnel. Oregon Business attributed the closure to the pandemic.

== Reception ==
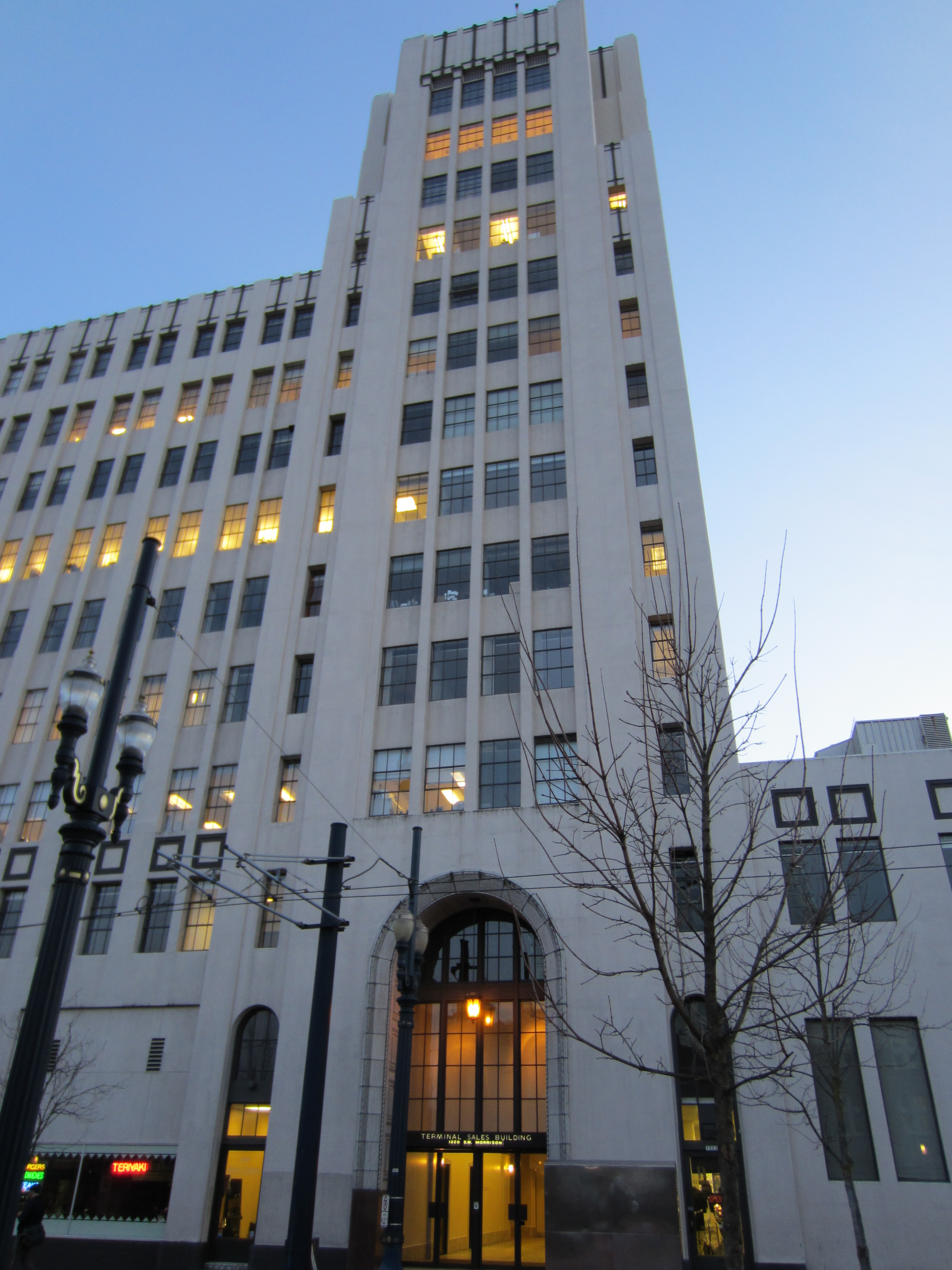
Shift Drinks was housed in the Terminal Sales Building (pictured in 2012).

Condé Nast Traveler said, "You're here for the excellent and bold drinks, the fresh bruschetta, the sprawling wine list, and the all-day happy hour". Samantha Bakall ranked Shift Drinks number four in The Oregonian's list of "Portland's best new bars of 2015". She also included the business in a 2017 list of the city's 10 best new happy hours, and Michael Russell included Shift Drinks in a 2016 list of Portland's 21 "essential" bars. Thrillist's Alex Frane included the business in a 2016 overview of the city's best cocktail bars. He also included Alise Moffatt in a list of "Portland's most influential and kick-ass bartenders of 2016", writing: "Though it took Shift Drinks a moment to find its footing, as of 2016, it offers one of the best and most inventive cocktail programs in the city, raising the standards for everyone. Alise can be found behind the stick almost every night of the week serving creative and delicious cocktails with expertise and an endearing passion."

In 2016, Willamette Week's Sami Gaston called Shift "a bartender's bar". In 2019, the newspaper said:

There may be times when a rooftop view is worth an overpriced cocktail. Shift Drinks is just the opposite. Come here if you need a quality drink and a simple space that leans more toward the contemplative than the rowdy. The music is good, the menu caters to modest budgeted connoisseurs and rookies looking for 'something sparkly' alike, and the snack menu easily makes a satisfying dinner.

In 2020, the Portland Mercury's Suzette Smith described the Moffatt's Physically Forgotten as "a standard and favorite". Following the bar's closure, Eater Portland's Brooke Jackson-Glidden called Shift "beloved" and "iconic". Frane mentioned the bar in the website's list of the "saddest Portland restaurant closures of 2020".

== See also ==
- Impact of the COVID-19 pandemic on the restaurant industry in the United States
