= South Portland Historic District =

Historic district in Portland, Oregon, U.S.

- U.S. National Register of Historic Places
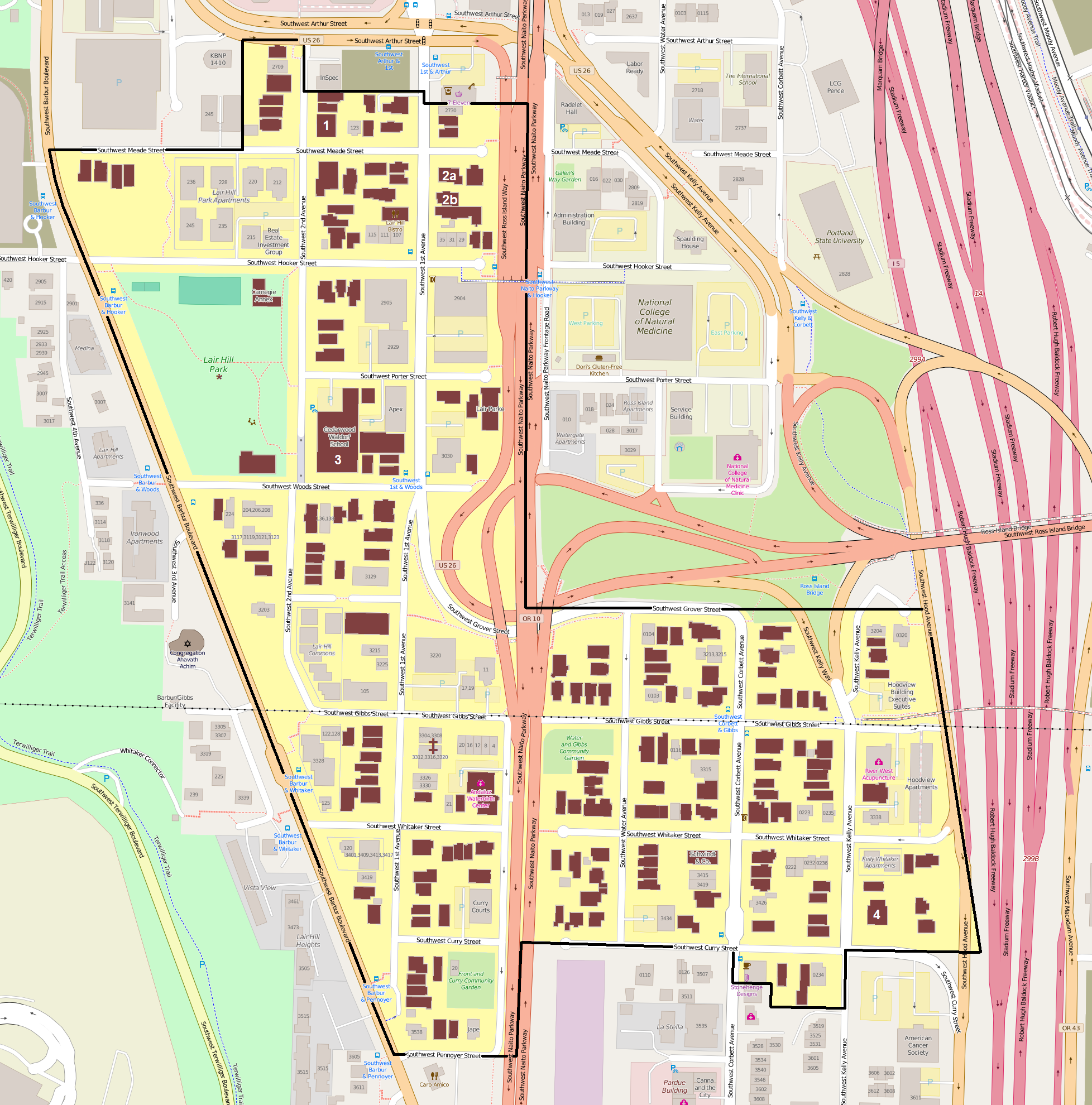
- Map of the district
- Location: Roughly bounded by Arthur, Front, Grover, Hood, and Curry Sts., and Barbur Blvd., Portland, Oregon
- Area: 49 acres (20 ha)
- Architect: Doyle, A.E.; Whidden & Lewis
- Architectural style: Late Victorian, Late 19th And Early 20th Century American Movements
- NRHP reference No.: 98000951
- Added to NRHP: July 31, 1998

The South Portland Historic District is an historic district in Portland, Oregon's South Portland neighborhood, in the United States. It was listed on the National Register of Historic Places in 1998.

== Description ==
The 31-block area is irregular in shape, bounded by Southwest Barbur Boulevard to the west and Southwest Hood Street to the east. Southwest Meade and Arthur Streets define much of the northern boundary.

The district has 111 primary contributing, 75 secondary contributing, and 13 historic non-contributing buildings. Five buildings in the district are listed on the National Register of Historic Places: the Corkish Apartments, Milton W. Smith House, Neighborhood House, and the Peter Taylor House and Gotlieb Haehlen House. The neighborhood exhibits Queen Anne, Rural Vernacular, and Italianate architectural styles, among others.

== See also ==
- National Register of Historic Places listings in Southwest Portland, Oregon
