= Burke–Clark House =

Historic building in Portland, Oregon, U.S.

- U.S. National Register of Historic Places
- Portland Historic Landmark
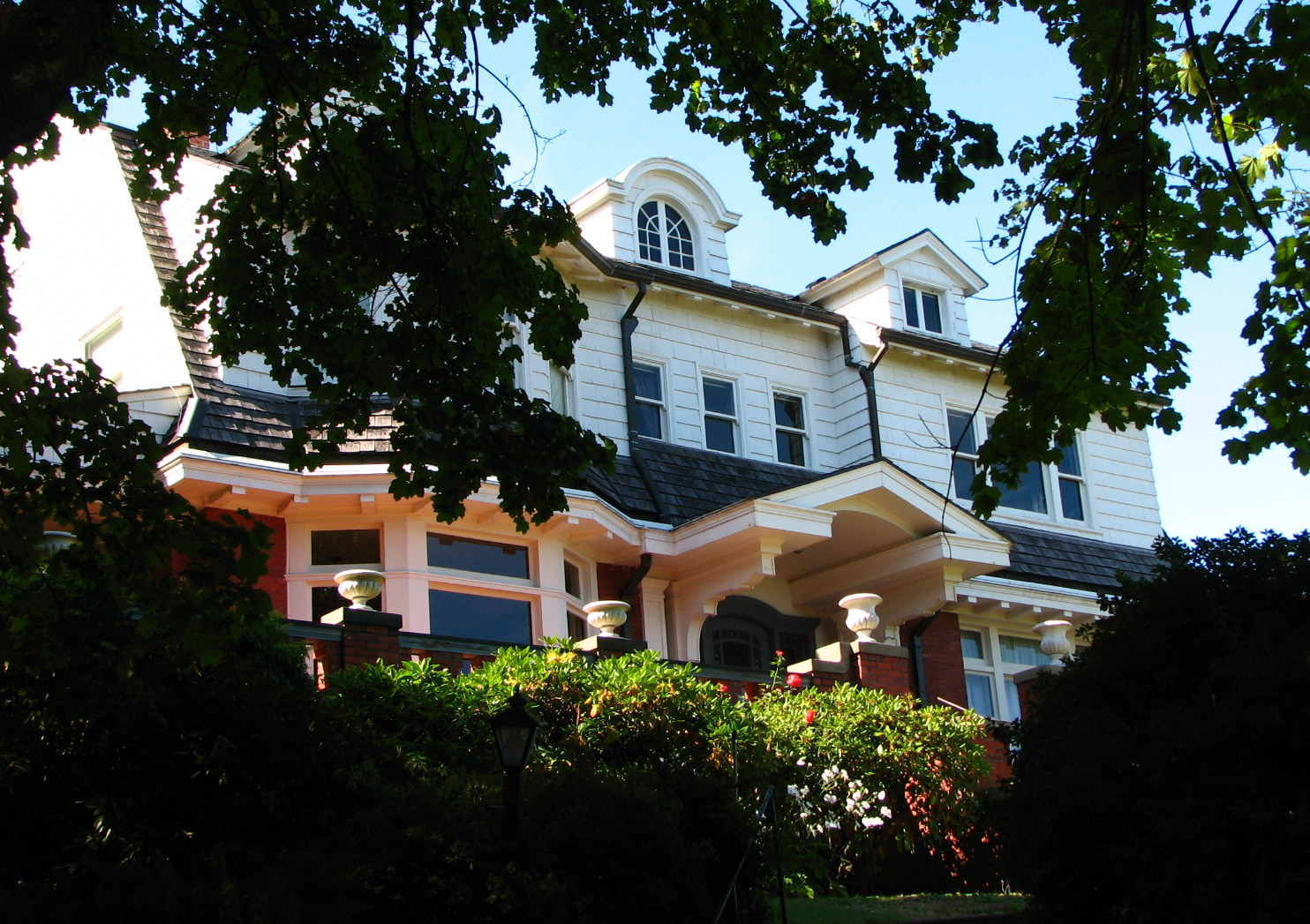
- The Burke–Clark House in 2008

- Location within Portland, Oregon
- Location: 2610 NW Cornell Road; Portland, Oregon
- Coordinates: 45°31′47″N 122°42′18″W
- Built: 1908
- Architect: A. E. Doyle
- Architectural style: Colonial Revival
- NRHP reference No.: 82003742
- Added to NRHP: August 26, 1982

The Burke–Clark House is a house located in northwest Portland, Oregon, United States, listed on the National Register of Historic Places.

== See also ==
- National Register of Historic Places listings in Northwest Portland, Oregon
