= Milton W. Smith House =

Historic building in Portland, Oregon, U.S.

- U.S. National Register of Historic Places
- U.S. Historic district – Contributing property
- Portland Historic Landmark
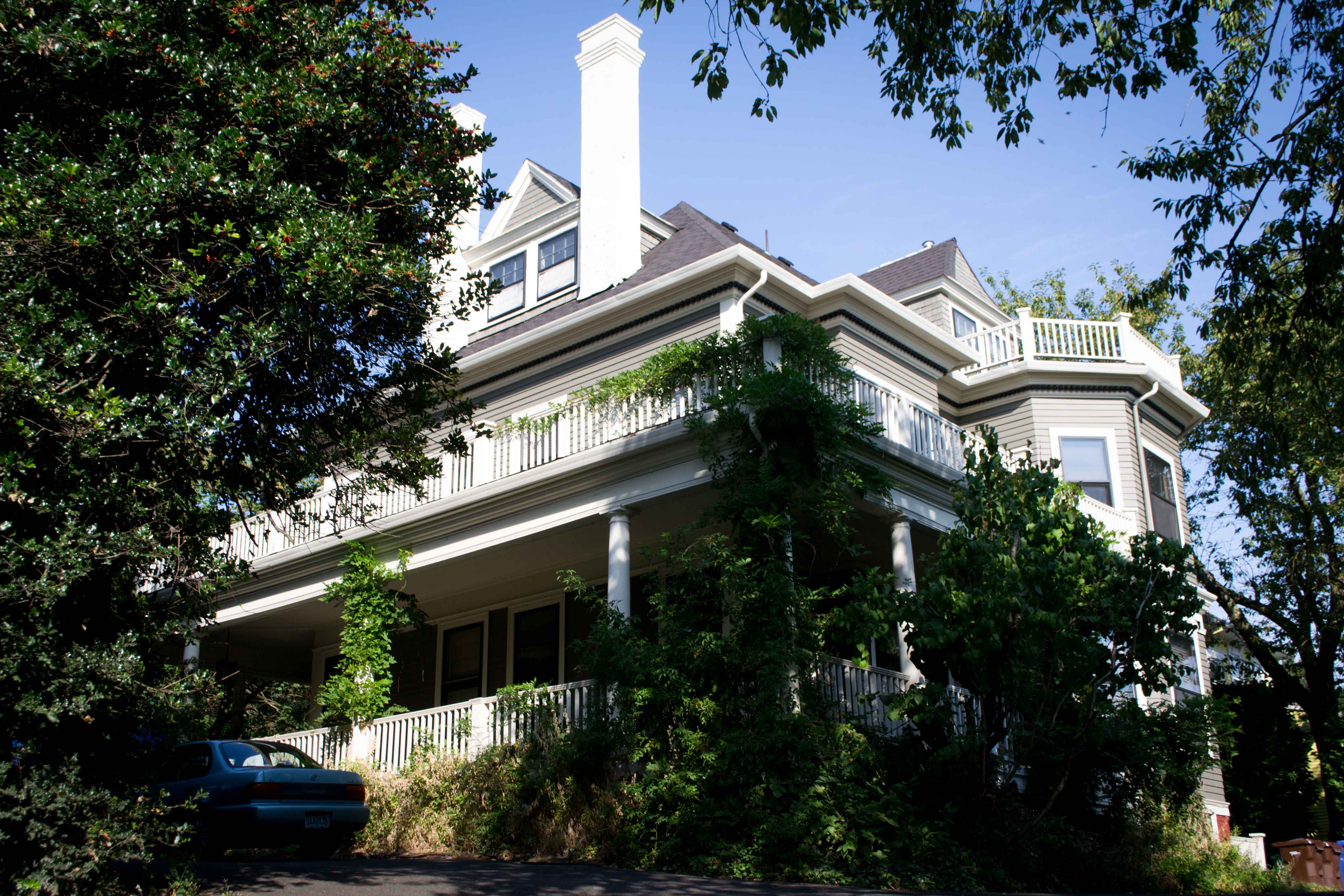
- The Milton W. Smith House in 2012

- Location within Portland, Oregon
- Location: 3434 S Kelly Avenue; Portland, Oregon
- Coordinates: 45°29′53″N 122°40′28″W
- Area: 0.2 acres (0.081 ha)
- Built: 1891
- Architect: Whidden & Lewis
- Architectural style: Colonial Revival
- Part of: South Portland Historic District (ID98000951)
- NRHP reference No.: 80004547
- Added to NRHP: January 11, 1980

The Milton W. Smith House is a house located in the south Portland historic district, Portland, Oregon listed on the National Register of Historic Places. Situated in a neighborhood then called Caruther's Addition, it is one of the state's earliest Colonial Revivalist-style structures and possibly the first residence to feature electricity.

== See also ==
- National Register of Historic Places listings in Southwest Portland, Oregon
