= Ball–Ehrman House =

Historic building in Portland, Oregon, U.S.

- U.S. National Register of Historic Places
- Portland Historic Landmark
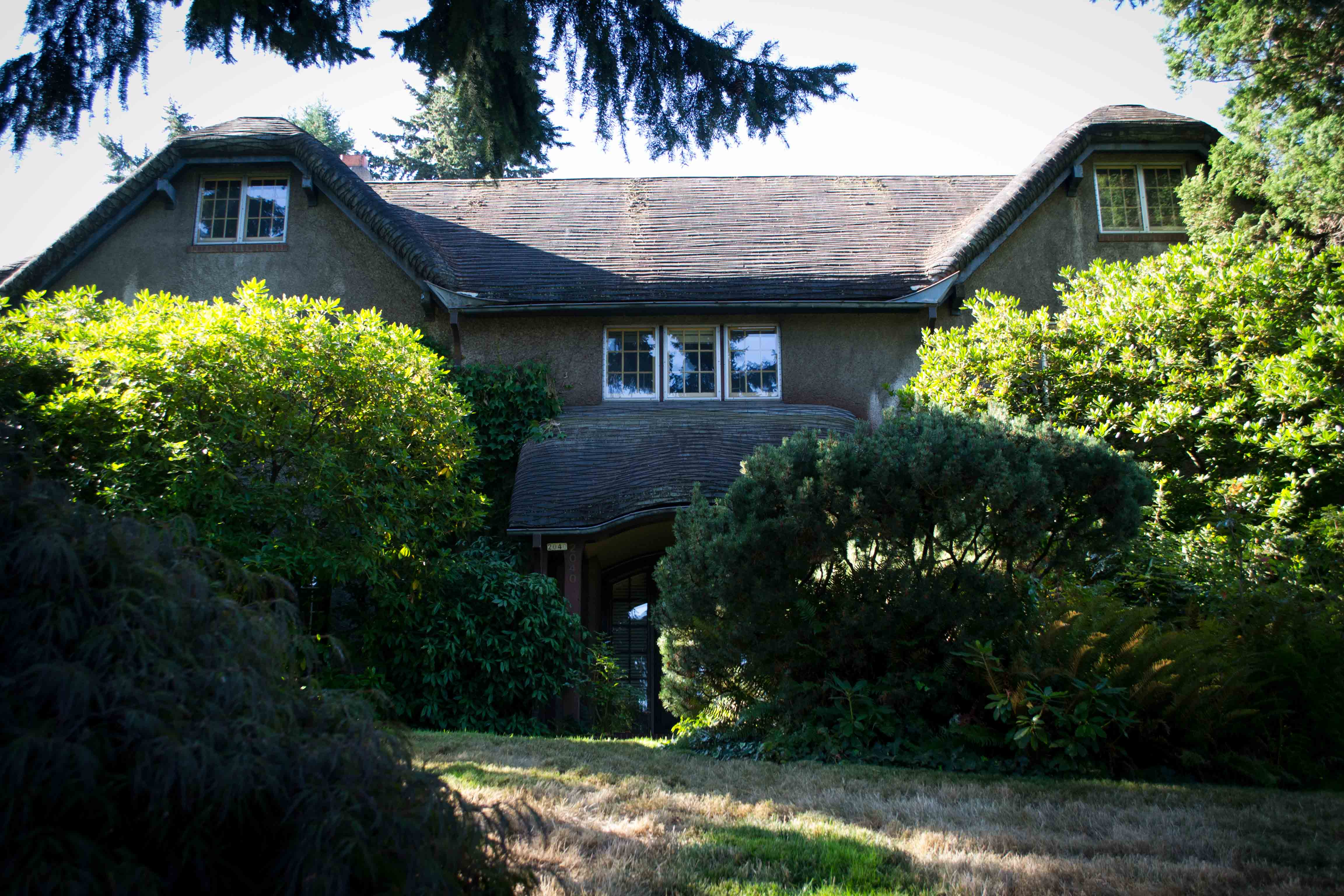
- The Ball–Ehrman House in 2012.

- Location within Portland, Oregon
- Location: 2040 SW Laurel Street; Portland, Oregon
- Coordinates: 45°30′38″N 122°41′57″W
- Area: 0.5 acres (0.20 ha)
- Built: 1923
- Architect: Albert E. Doyle
- Architectural style: English Cottage
- NRHP reference No.: 91000143
- Added to NRHP: February 22, 1991

The Ball–Ehrman House is a house located in southwest Portland, Oregon, listed on the National Register of Historic Places.

== See also ==
- National Register of Historic Places listings in Southwest Portland, Oregon
