= J. G. Edwards House =

Historic building in Portland, Oregon, U.S.

- U.S. National Register of Historic Places
- Portland Historic Landmark
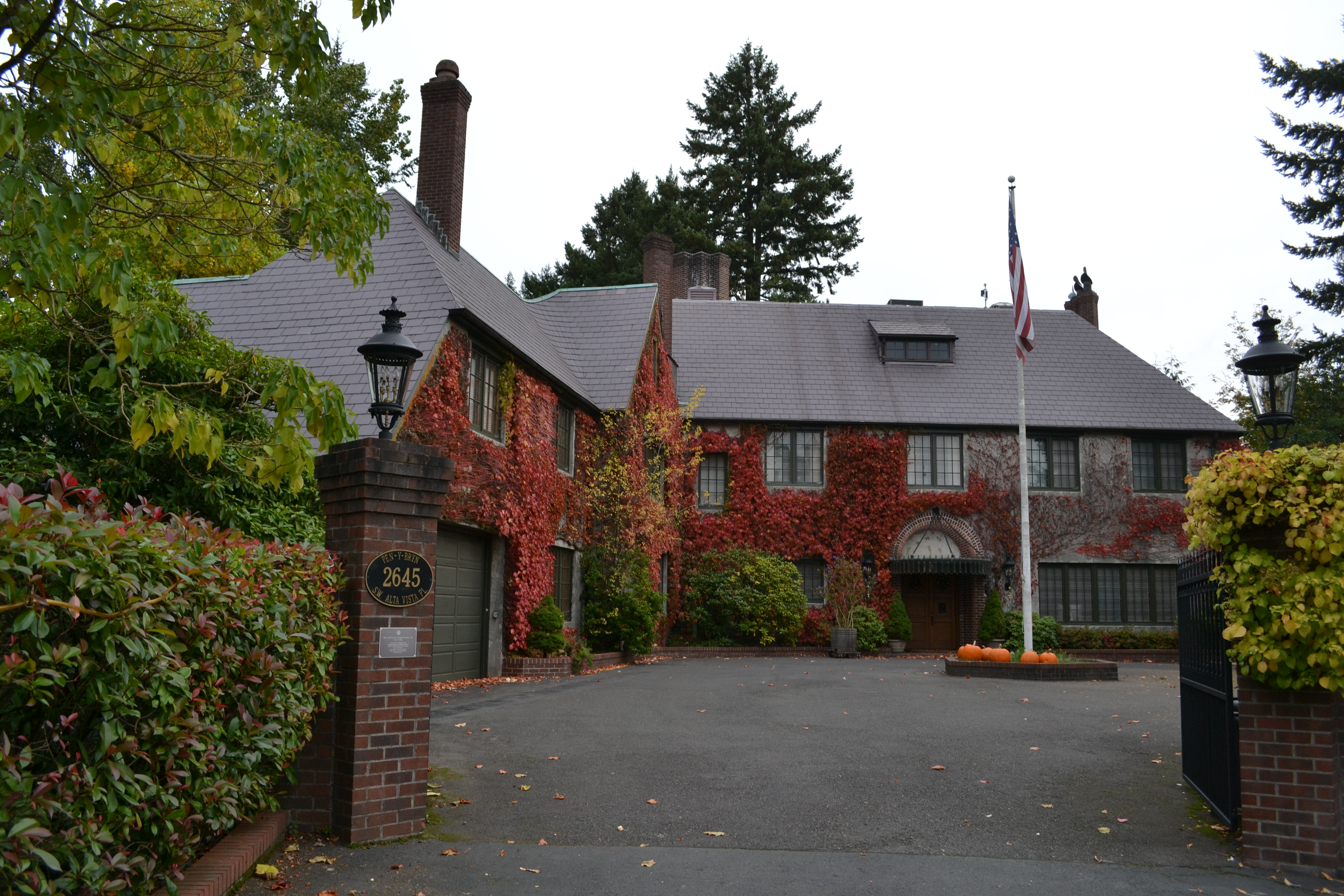
- The Edwards House in 2011.

- Location within Portland, Oregon
- Location: 2645 SW Alta Vista Place; Portland, Oregon
- Coordinates: 45°30′32″N 122°42′17″W
- Area: 1.1 acres (0.45 ha)
- Built: 1926
- Architect: A. E. Doyle
- Architectural style: Norman farmhouse
- NRHP reference No.: 91000128
- Added to NRHP: February 22, 1991

The J. G. Edwards House, also known as Pen-y-Brin, in Portland, Oregon, was built in 1926 in the "Norman farmhouse" style. It was designed by A.E. Doyle. It was listed on the National Register of Historic Places in 1991.
