= Terminal Sales Building =

Historic building in Portland, Oregon, U.S.

- U.S. National Register of Historic Places
- Portland Historic Landmark
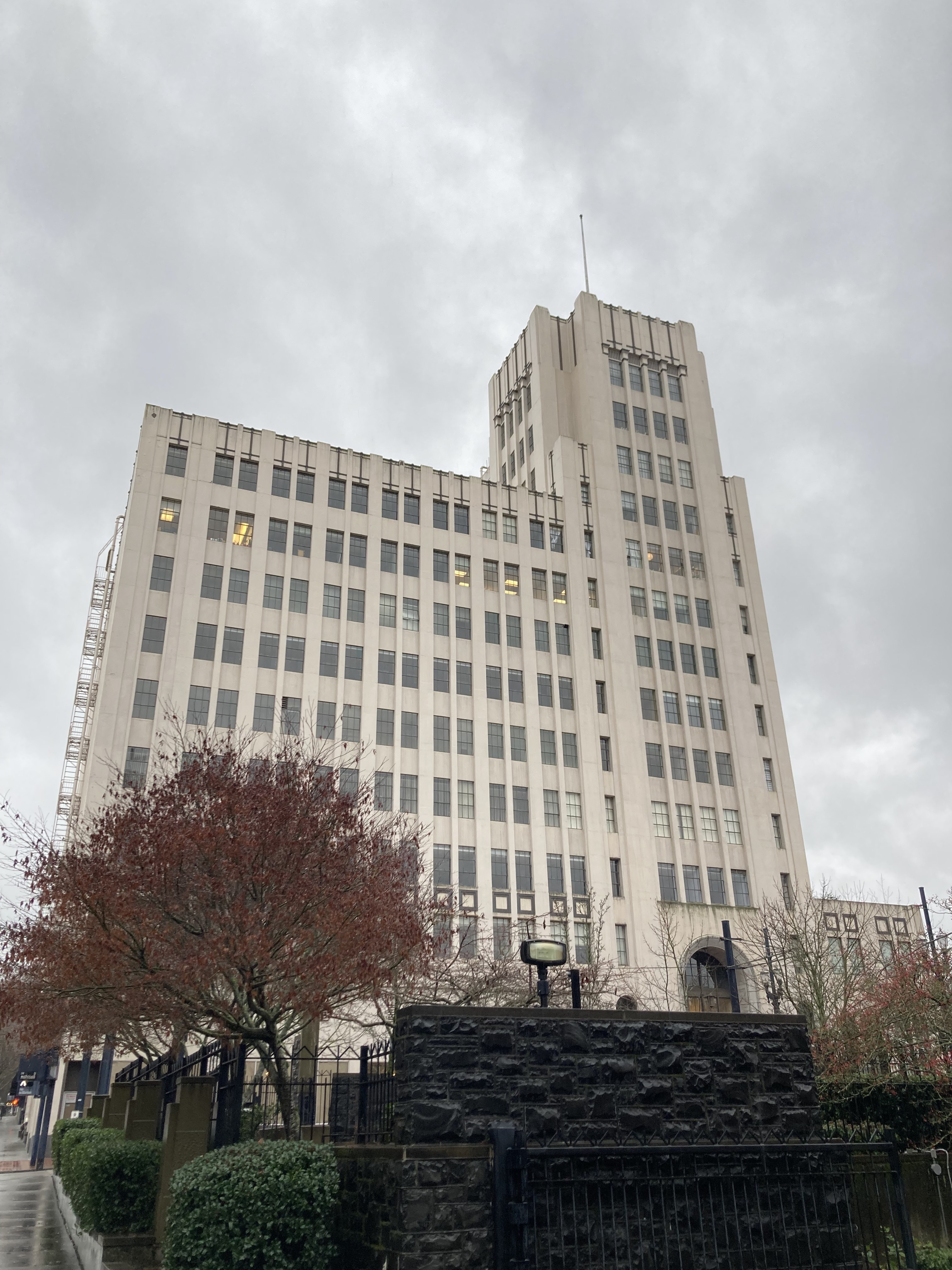
- The Terminal Sales Building

- Location within Portland, Oregon Location within Oregon Location within the United States
- Location: 1220 SW Morrison Street; Portland, Oregon
- Coordinates: 45°31′14″N 122°41′05″W
- Built: 1927
- Architect: A.E. Doyle
- Architectural style: Art Deco, Modernistic
- NRHP reference No.: 91001555
- Added to NRHP: October 17, 1991

The Terminal Sales Building is a historic building in Portland, Oregon, United States. One of the few pieces of prominent Art Deco architecture in Portland, it is the only high-rise example. While the building's design may be credited to Wilfred Frank Higgins, Mr. Higgins was working under the architect A.E. Doyle, who referred to Higgins as his draftsman. Doyle was so involved with the project, that he continued to direct Higgins even while traveling in Europe, wiring the office instructions on paint specifications.

The building was completed in 1927; it stands 155 feet (47 m) tall and has 13 above-ground floors. The Terminal Sales Building was placed on the National Register of Historic Places on October 17, 1991.

== See also ==
- Architecture of Portland, Oregon
- National Register of Historic Places listings in Southwest Portland, Oregon
- Shift Drinks
