= Dr. Herbert S. Nichols House =

Historic building in Portland, Oregon, U.S.

- U.S. National Register of Historic Places
- Portland Historic Landmark
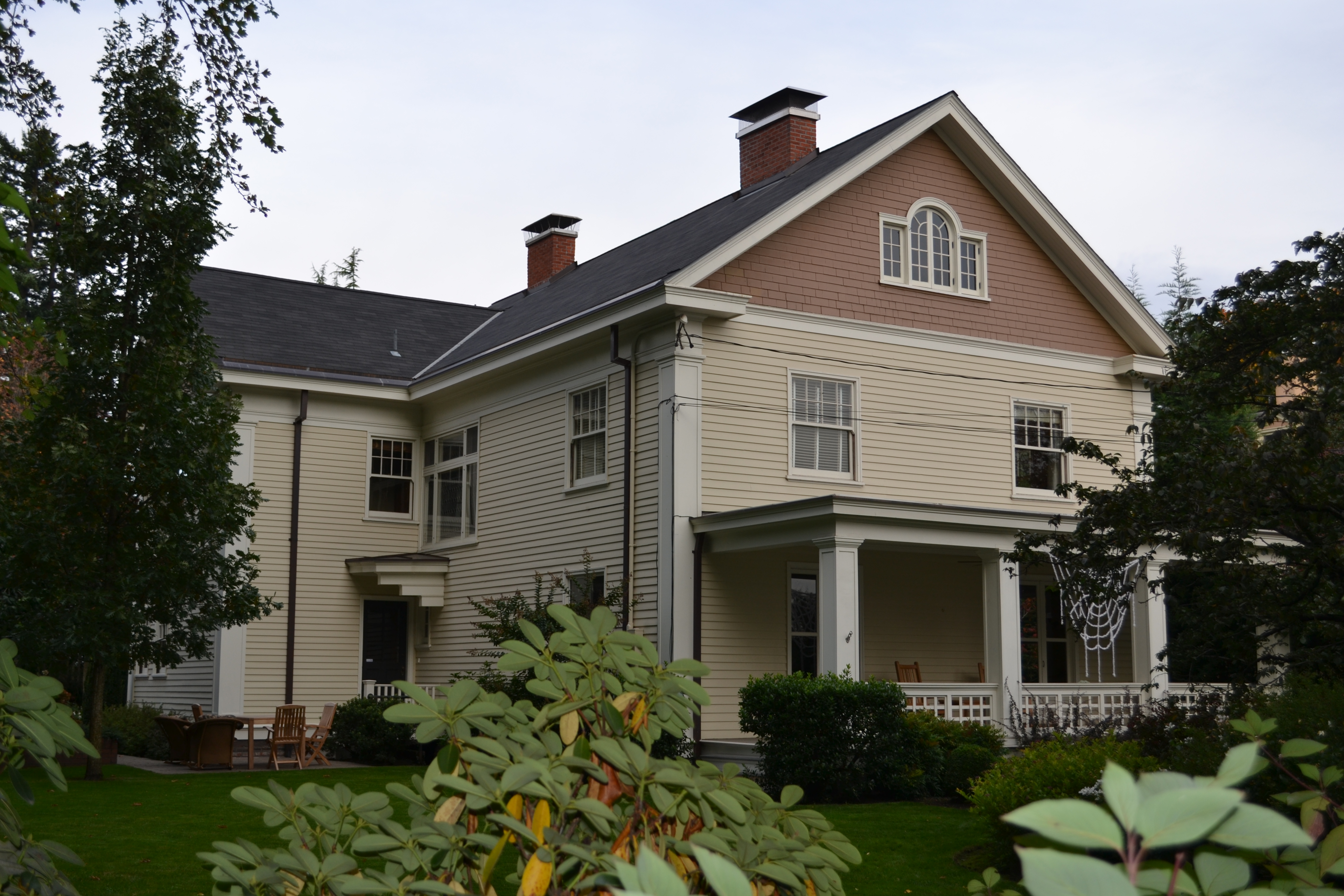
- The Nichols House in 2011.

- Location within Portland, Oregon Location within Oregon Location within the United States
- Location: 1925 SW Vista Avenue; Portland, Oregon
- Coordinates: 45°30′48″N 122°41′50″W
- Area: 0.3 acres (0.12 ha)
- Built: 1908
- Architect: A. E. Doyle
- Architectural style: Colonial Revival
- NRHP reference No.: 90000829
- Added to NRHP: June 01, 1990

The Dr. Herbert S. Nichols House is a house located in southwest Portland, Oregon listed on the National Register of Historic Places.

== See also ==
- National Register of Historic Places listings in Southwest Portland, Oregon
