= Jesse C. Bowles House =

Historic home in Seattle, Washington, US

- U.S. National Register of Historic Places
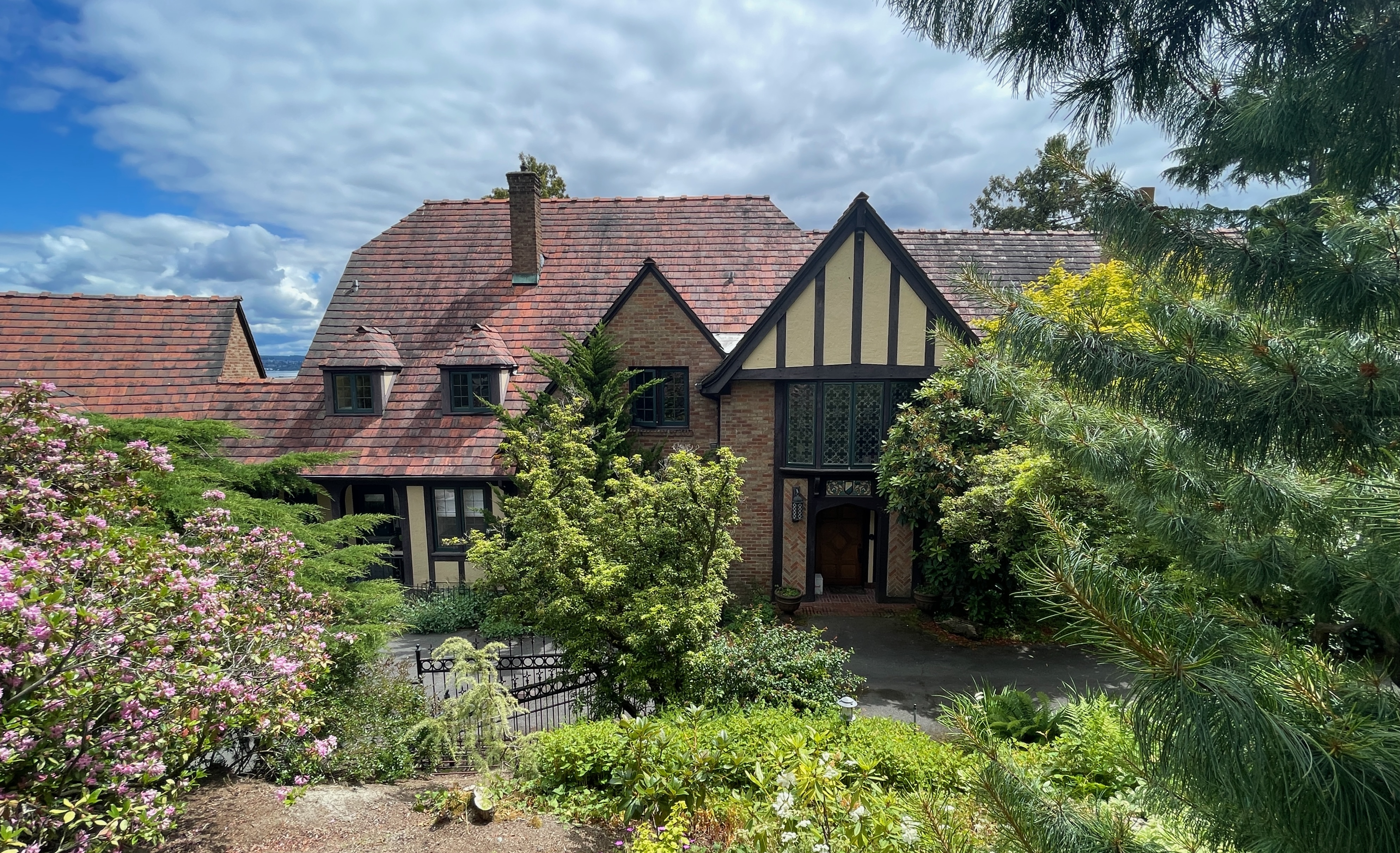
- Jesse C. Bowles residence, in 2024

- Location within Washington (state) Location within the United States
- Location: 2540 Shoreland Drive, Seattle, Washington, U.S.
- Coordinates: 47°34′50″N 122°17′06″W
- Area: 30 ft (9.1 m) by 92 ft (28 m)
- Built: 1925; 101 years ago
- Architect: Arthur Lamont Loveless
- Architectural style: Tudor Revival
- NRHP reference No.: 86003162
- Added to NRHP: November 6, 1986

The Jesse C. Bowles House is a historic residence located in the Mount Baker neighborhood of Seattle, Washington. The house was listed on the National Register of Historic Places on November 6, 1986. The residence is a well-maintained example of 20th-century Tudor Revival architecture.

== History ==
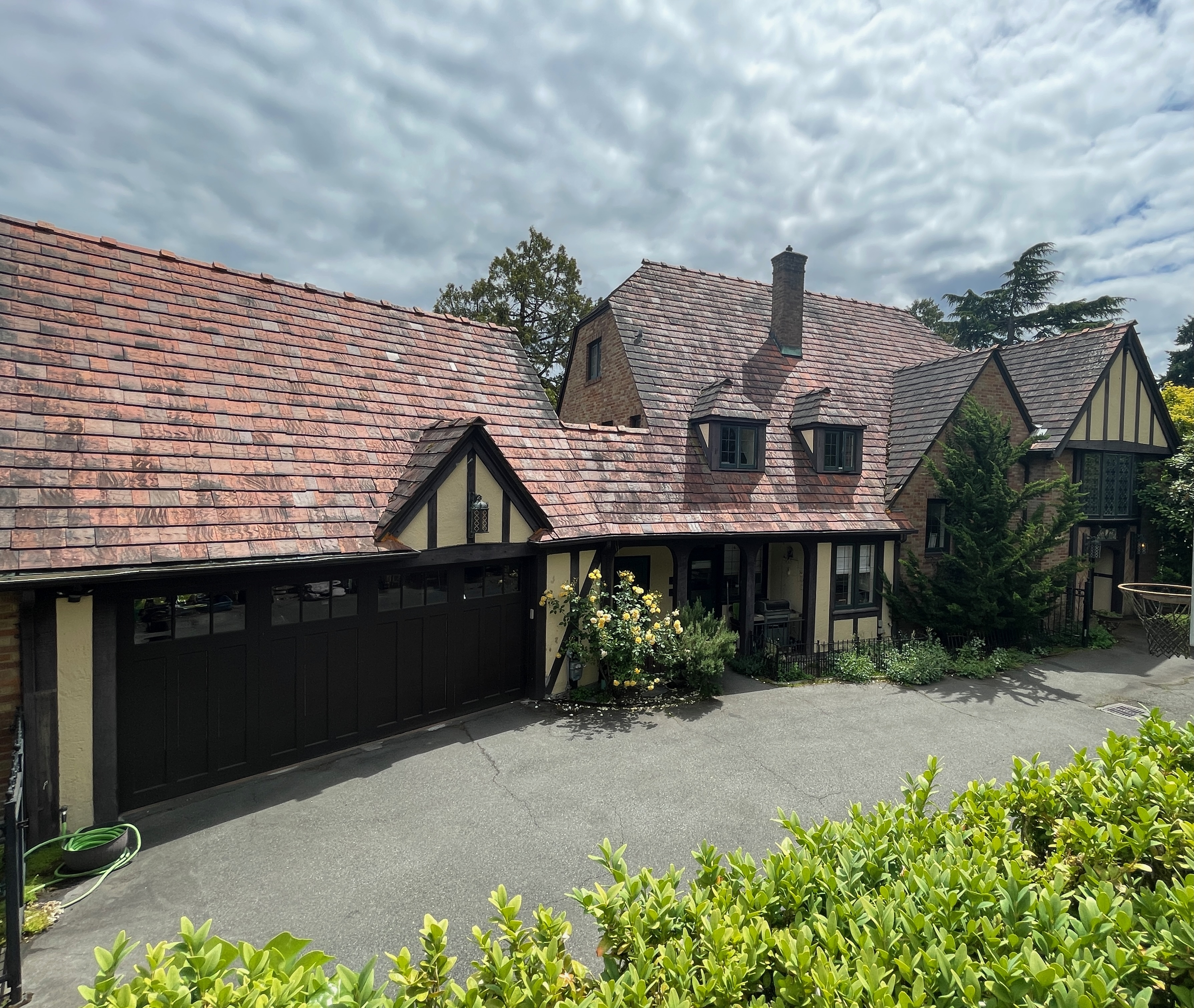
Jesse C. Bowles house and garage, in 2024

The Jesse C. Bowles House is located on a bank off Shoreland Drive in the Mount Baker neighborhood of Seattle, Washington, on four lots measuring 60 ft (18 m)-wide, adjacent to Lake Washington. The house was designed by residental architect Arthur Lamont Loveless (1873-1971) in the Tudor Revival-style and built in 1925.

The three-story brick home is 30 ft (9.1 m) by 92 ft (28 m) with a concrete foundation, wood-framing with half-timbering, Tudor arches, and a pitched gable roof with clay tiles and an attic. Rooms and casement windows have views of the lake. Modifications to kitchen and bedrooms were done in the 1950s. The residence is among the largest properties in the Mount Baker neighborhood.

The Bowles House was constructed for Jesse C. Bowles (1890-1959) and his wife Louise. Bowles was the president of both the Northwest Envelope Company and the Bowles Realty Company. His father, Charles Bowles, moved to Seattle around 1900 and contributed to the founding of the Bowles Wholesale Plumbing Company and Northwest Steel in Portland, Oregon.

== Historical significance ==
The Jesse C. Bowles House is historically significant based on its example of Tudor Revival architecture, its association with local businessman Jesse C. Bowles, and its location in the Mount Baker neighborhood. The Bowles House was officially listed the National Register of Historic Places on November 6, 1986.

== See also ==
- Bowles House
- Seattle Landmarks Preservation Board
- National Register of Historic Places listings in Seattle
