= Butler Bank =

- U.S. National Register of Historic Places
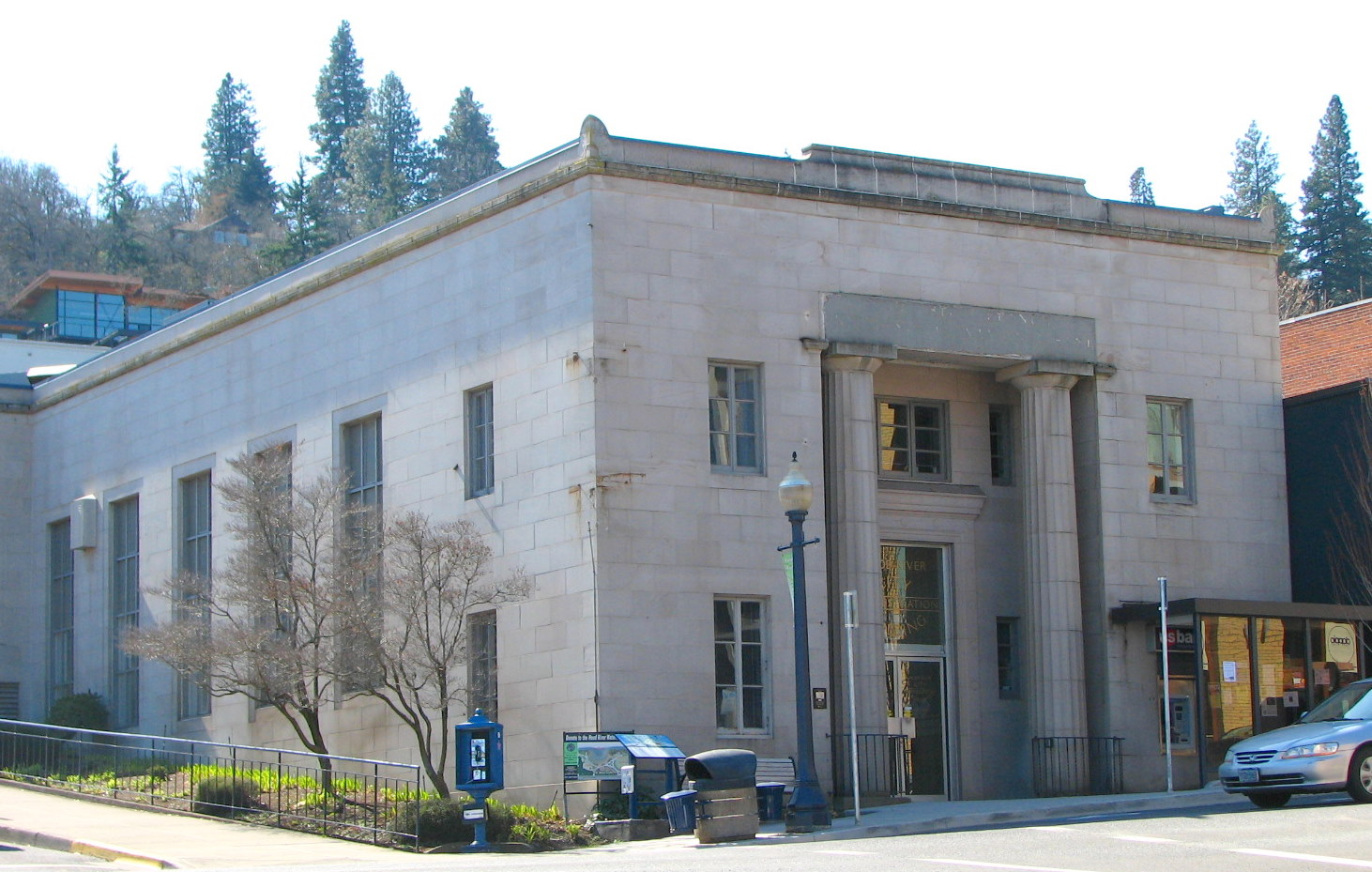
- The Butler Bank building in 2009

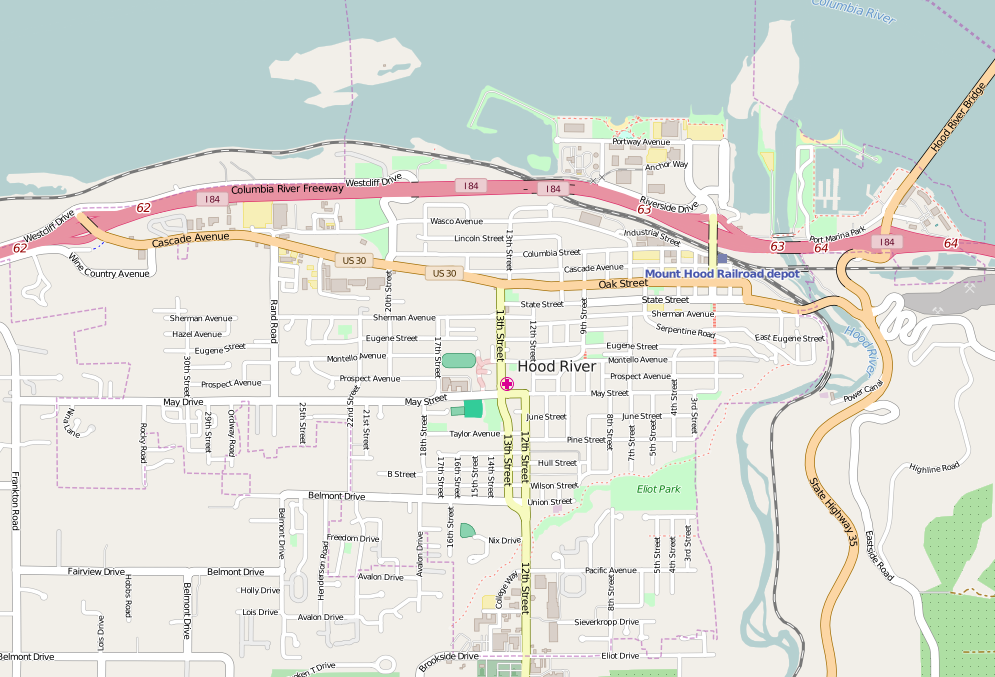
- Location within Hood River OR
- Location: 301 Oak Street; Hood River, Oregon
- Coordinates: 45°42′31″N 121°30′49″W
- Area: Less than 1 acre (0.40 ha)
- Built: 1924
- Built by: Hansen, Hammond & Clist
- Architect: A. E. Doyle
- Architectural style: Egyptian Revival
- NRHP reference No.: 99001713
- Added to NRHP: January 27, 2000

Butler Bank is a historic bank building in downtown Hood River, Oregon, United States, built during Hood River's second major phase of urban development.

== History ==
It was designed by Portland-based A. E. Doyle (1877–1928), one of the Pacific Northwest's most celebrated architects of the early 20th century, during the later years of his career.

It is one of only two commercial buildings he designed in the Columbia River Gorge region, and his only Egyptian Revival-style commission in Oregon.

It was erected in 1924 for Butler Banking Company, which was led by Leslie Butler (1847–1944). Butler and his son Truman opened the Butler and Company Bank in 1900 as Hood River's first bank and incorporated it as the Butler Banking Company in 1905.

Despite early commercial success, after the Great Depression it failed in 1932. The Butlers were regarded as blameless in the failure and continued as respected businessmen. In addition to his prominent role in business during the early years of Hood River's development, Leslie Butler was very active in voluntary and philanthropic activities throughout Oregon, especially in the area of public health.

The bank building was listed on the National Register of Historic Places in 2000.

== See also ==
- National Register of Historic Places listings in Hood River County, Oregon
