= Neighborhood House (Portland, Oregon) =

Historic building in Portland, Oregon, U.S.

- U.S. National Register of Historic Places
- U.S. Historic district – Contributing property
- Portland Historic Landmark
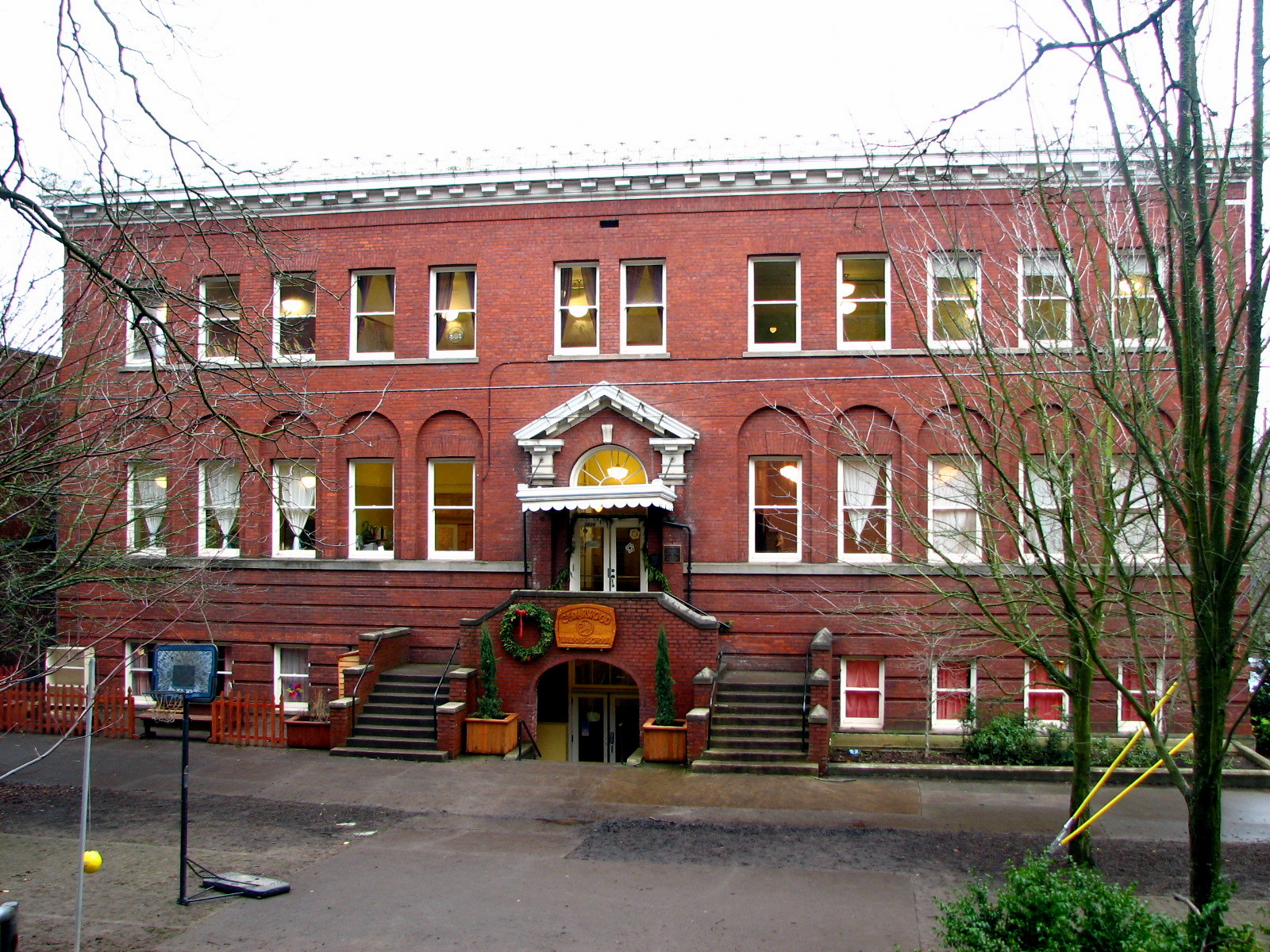
- The building's exterior in 2009

- Location within Portland, Oregon Location within Oregon Location within the United States
- Location: 3030 SW 2nd Avenue; Portland, Oregon
- Coordinates: 45°30′04″N 122°40′46″W
- Built: 1910
- Architect: A. E. Doyle
- Architectural style: Colonial Revival, Georgian Revival
- Part of: South Portland Historic District (ID98000951)
- NRHP reference No.: 79003737
- Added to NRHP: July 10, 1979

The Neighborhood House, located in southwest Portland, Oregon, is listed on the National Register of Historic Places.

== See also ==
- National Register of Historic Places listings in Southwest Portland, Oregon
