= Cora Bryant Wheeler House =

Historic building in Portland, Oregon, U.S.

- U.S. National Register of Historic Places
- Portland Historic Landmark
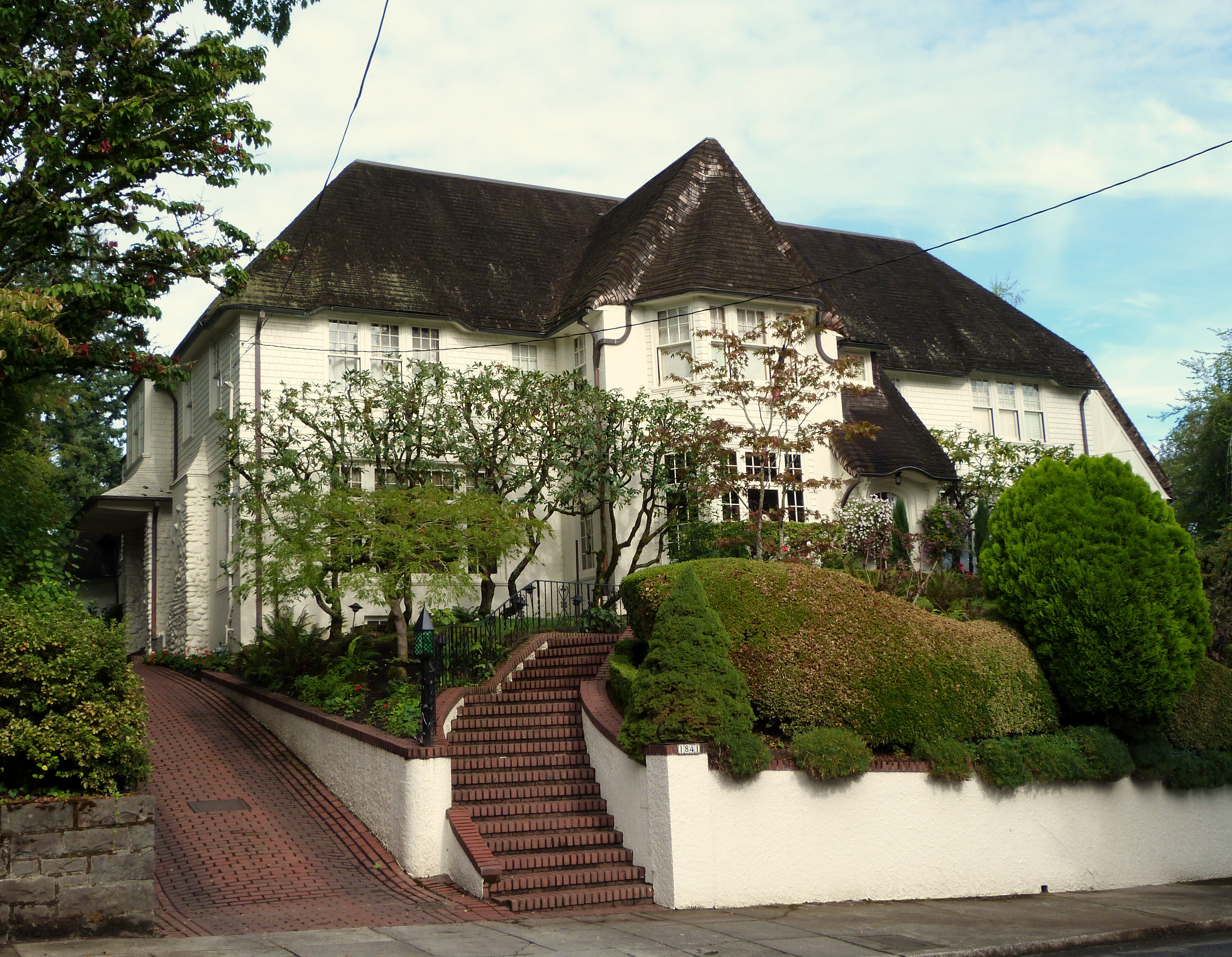
- The Wheeler House in 2013.

- Location within Portland, Oregon
- Location: 1841 SW Montgomery Drive; Portland, Oregon
- Coordinates: 45°30′53″N 122°41′53″W
- Area: 0.82 acres (0.33 ha)
- Built: 1923
- Built by: Robertson, Hay & Wallace
- Architect: A. E. Doyle
- Architectural style: English Arts and Crafts
- NRHP reference No.: 90000295
- Added to NRHP: February 23, 1990

The Cora Bryant Wheeler House, also known as the Mrs. Coleman H. Wheeler House, is a historic house located in Portland, Oregon, United States. Architect A. E. Doyle designed this 1923 Arts and Crafts house to take full advantage of its prominent and demanding ridgetop location. The land was purchased by Coleman and Cora in 1918 from the Frank Dekum family. The house's complex lines and massing articulating the shape of the hill, and notably including a significant amount of lumber from the Wheelers' own timberlands in the Coast Range, the Wheeler House became an important later addition to the portfolio that made Doyle one of Portland's leading architects. Junior partner Pietro Belluschi and apprentice Richard Sundeleaf, each of whom later became a significant architect in his own right, provided on-site construction supervision. The house was added to the National Register of Historic Places in 1990.

Cora died in 1951. Their daughter, Marguerite, still resided in the house, selling it in 1953.

== See also ==
- National Register of Historic Places listings in Southwest Portland, Oregon
