= Eugene Science Center =

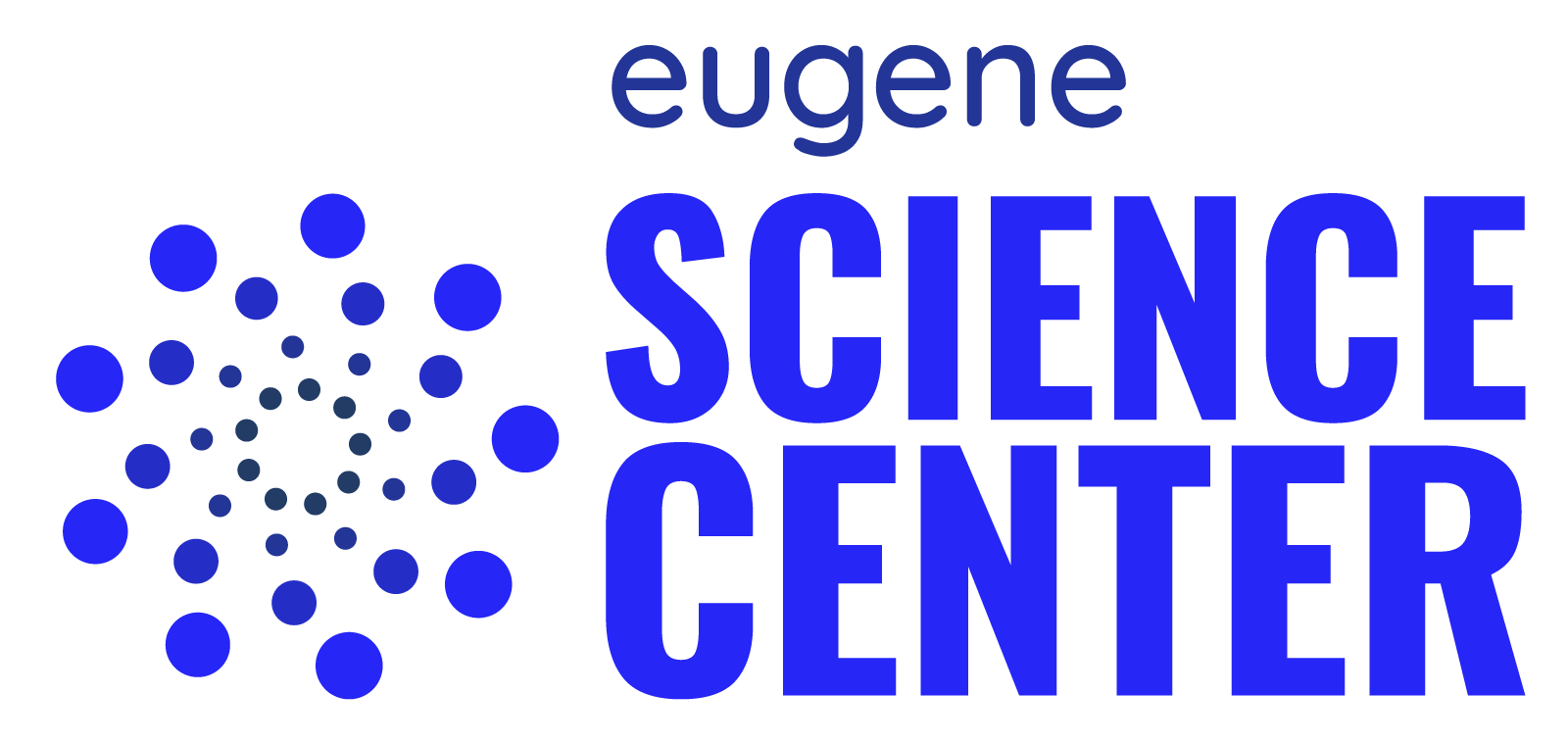

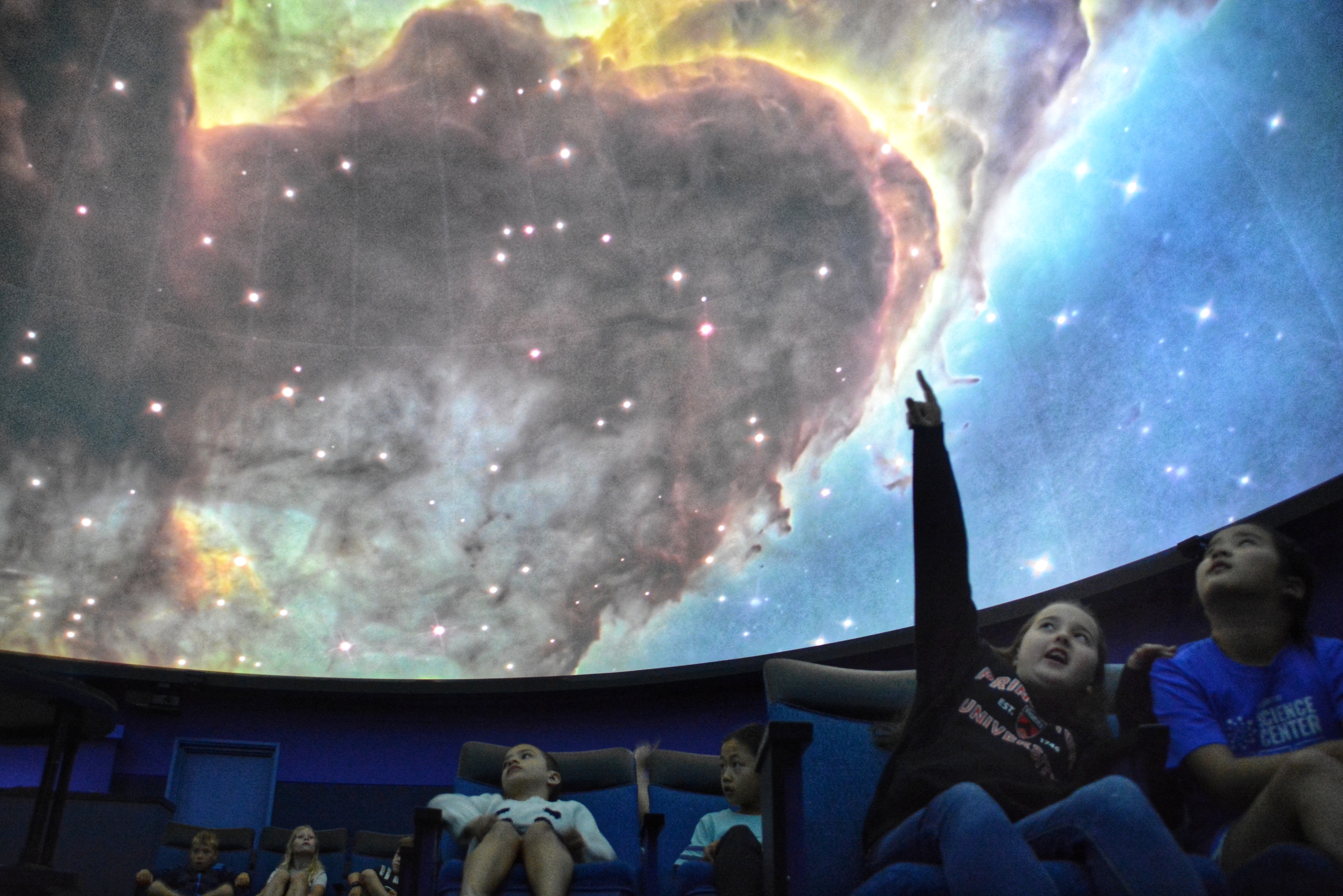
- Former name: Southwest OMSI Willamette Science and Technology Center The Science Factory
- Established: 1961
- Location: 2300 Leo Harris Parkway; Eugene, Oregon
- Coordinates: 44.056°N 123.072°W
- Type: Science Museum
- Director: Tim W. Scott
- Website: eugenesciencecenter.org

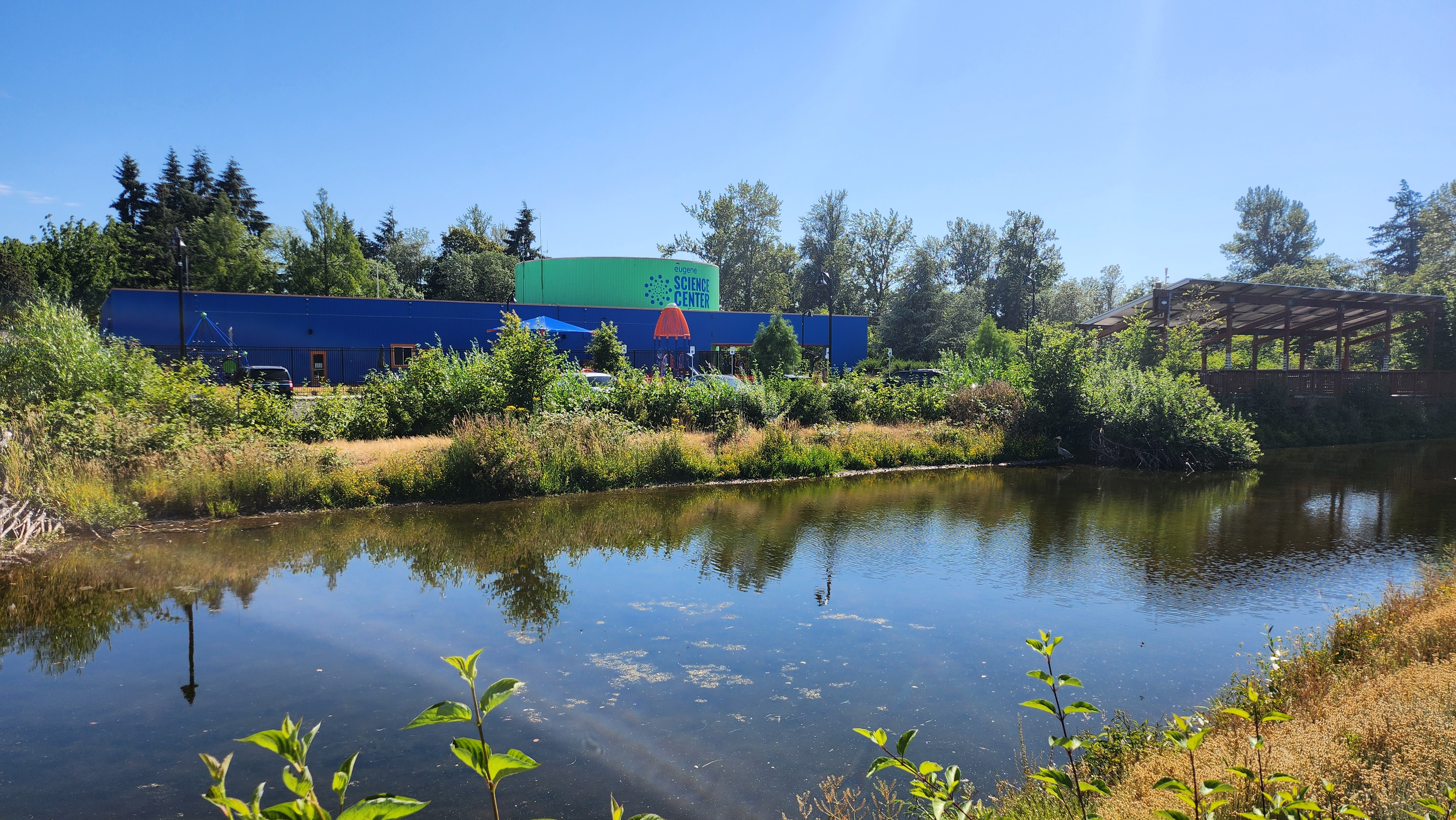
Exterior image of Eugene Science Center

The Eugene Science Center, located in Alton Baker Park in Eugene, Oregon, United States, is a science and technology center for children, families, and school groups. The 10,000-square-foot (930 m^{2}) museum near Autzen Stadium features changing interactive exhibits, planetarium shows, camp programs, special events and other science and technology-related education programs. Eugene Science Center is an independent 501(c)(3) non-profit organization.

== History ==
Eugene Science Center was founded in 1961 as the Southwest Oregon Museum of Science and Industry (SWOMSI). SWOMSI received initial support from its parent organization, Oregon Museum of Science and Industry (OMSI) of Portland, but soon after became an independent museum with a board of directors composed primarily of local educators.

SWOMSI first occupied the historic Oregon Electric Railway Passenger Station (later Oregon Electric Station restaurant), located at 5th Avenue and Willamette Street. During its early years in the station, SWOMSI offered exhibits and classes and ran planetarium shows in the Spitz Planetarium, a facility operated by OMSI.

In 1973, SWOMSI's Board of Directors approached the Lane County Commissioners to ask for space in the newly created Alton Baker Park. Following a break from OMSI, SWOMSI became the Willamette Science and Technology Center (WISTEC). Major funding for the new museum was obtained under the Economic Development Administration and each of the consortium members (Lane Community College, Lane Education Service District, University of Oregon, and WISTEC) contributed substantially to the project, financially and through in-kind services. At that time, the Oregon Electric Railway Station was sold and $50,000 in WISTEC funds were put into construction of the present building in Alton Baker Park.

From 1978 to 1979, the WISTEC building and the new planetarium was constructed. WISTEC opened at its present location in 1980. When the City of Eugene took control of most of Alton Baker Park in the mid-1980s, it also took ownership of the WISTEC building. The planetarium was at that time functionally and financially separate from the museum. The planetarium eventually became the sole responsibility of the Lane Education Service District and was closed in December 2002, after a funding crisis. In January 2002, WISTEC changed its name to The Science Factory and with the transfer of the planetarium and the building to Science Factory ownership in 2003, it became the Science Factory Children's Museum & Planetarium. The name reverted to Science Factory in 2016 and then formally changed to Eugene Science Center in January 2018.

== Exhibits ==
Eugene Science Center features a planetarium, an exhibit hall with several permanent and changing exhibits, and an outdoor science park featuring large interactive science experiences.

=== Planetarium ===
Eugene Science Center Planetarium, owned and operated by the museum since 2002, seats 85 people. The planetarium offers live and pre-recorded digital shows to the public year-round.

In March 2017, the digital planetarium projector failed. After months of fundraising for a permanent replacement system, a new projector was installed in August 2018, employing laser-phosphor technology. The new equipment provides full-dome projection in high-contrast, 4k resolution.

=== Temporary exhibits ===
A large portion of Eugene Science Center's Exhibit Hall can be devoted to temporary traveling exhibits. Notable past exhibits include "Yesterday's Tomorrows", "Magna Carta", "Brain Teasers", "The Sound of Science", "Finding Your Way", "Tech City", "Your Healer Within", and "A View From Space."

=== The Tot Spot ===
The Tot Spot was an exploration space devoted to children five years old and younger. It was closed during the COVID-19 shutdown.

=== Community Room ===
In 2017, the Eugene Science Center re-purposed its conference room into a Community Room which is open to the public during regular museum hours.
