= East Portland Branch, Public Library of Multnomah County =

Historic library building in Portland, Oregon, U.S.

- U.S. National Register of Historic Places
- Portland Historic Landmark
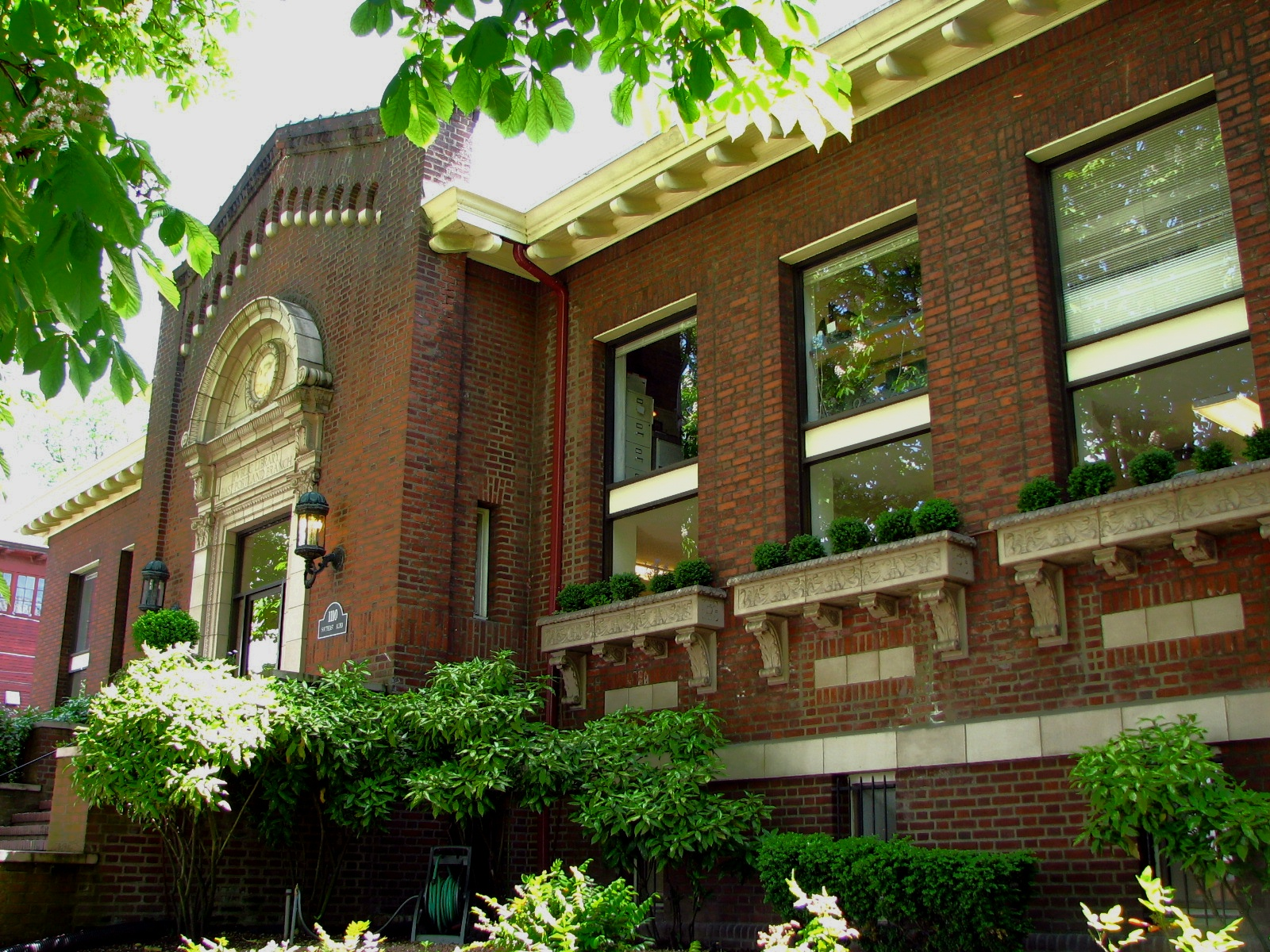
- The East Portland Branch Library in 2008 as an office building

- Location within Portland, Oregon
- Location: 1110 Southeast Alder Street, Portland, Oregon
- Coordinates: 45°31′04″N 122°39′15″W
- Built: 1911
- Architect: A. E. Doyle (Doyle, Patterson & Beach)
- Architectural style: Renaissance Italian
- NRHP reference No.: 87001491
- Added to NRHP: 1987

The East Portland Branch, Public Library of Multnomah County housed part of the library system of Multnomah County, Oregon, from 1911 to 1967. Designed by architect A. E. Doyle, the structure was completed in 1911 in Portland at 1110 Southeast Alder Street in the city's central eastside. Funded in part by the Carnegie Foundation, the original building consisted of one floor and a daylight basement and included reading rooms for children and adults. The building had a red brick exterior, terra-cotta trim, and a roof of green Spanish tiles. Remodeled in 1956 and remodeled again prior to its sale in 1967, the one-story building, which had rooms 18 feet (5.5 m) high, became a two-story office building.

From 1864 until 1902, Portland had subscription libraries that were open to the public, but it had no tax-supported public library. In 1902, the library system became tax-supported, free, and open to all Portland residents. A year later, it was opened to all residents of Multnomah County. Within months of the change from subscription library to free public library, the number of users grew from 1,000 members to 8,000 registered borrowers.

The subscription libraries had reading rooms only in downtown Portland. To accommodate the growing number of users, the new library established reading rooms in other parts of the city. By 1907, it had neighborhood branches in Sellwood, Albina, and the central eastside neighborhood. Doyle designed a small temporary building for the eastside branch before money became available for the permanent structure.
