= StormBreaker Brewing =

Brewery in Portland, Oregon, U.S.

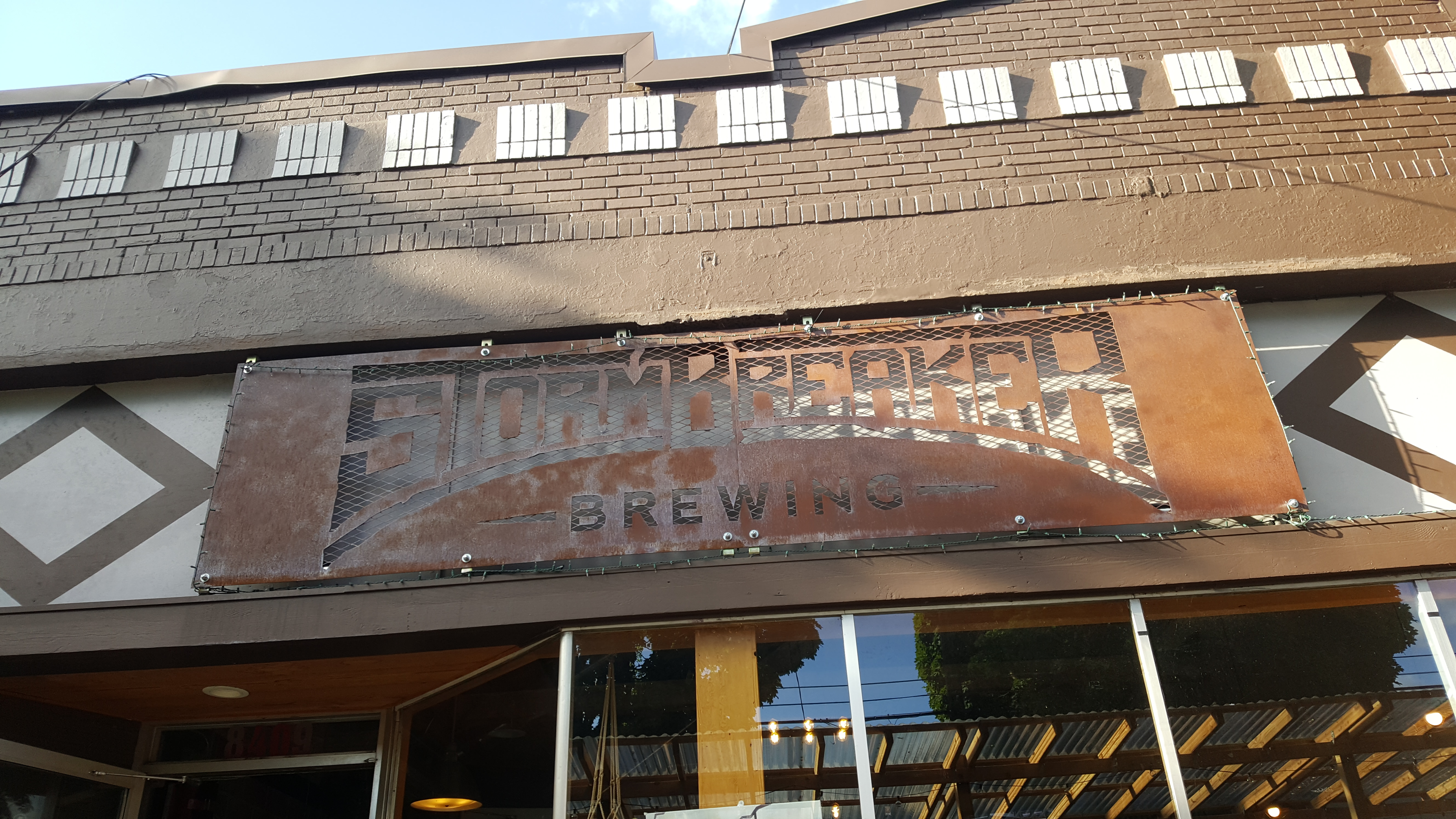
- Exterior of the location in St. Johns, Portland, Oregon, 2021

Restaurant information
- Location: Portland, Oregon, United States
- Website: stormbreakerbrewing.com

StormBreaker Brewing is a brewery based in Portland, Oregon. Rob Lutz and Dan Malech established the company in 2014. The original restaurant is located on North Mississippi Avenue in the Boise neighborhood, and a second opened in the St. Johns neighborhood in 2018.

Beers have included a pumpkin ale called Pumpkin Pedaler. The menu has included burgers and grilled cheese, waffle-cut potato chips, arugula-pear-beet salad, and flank steak with broccolini, cauliflower, lentils, or potatoes as sides. The happy hour menu has included chips and salsa, macaroni and cheese, pickles, and a "smorgasboard" with honey-drizzled blue cheese, porcine terrine, and poultry pâté.

Both locations offered outdoor dining during the COVID-19 pandemic. The business was included in Eater Portland's 2022 "Handy Dining Guide to North Mississippi Avenue".

== See also ==
- List of restaurant chains in the United States
