= Corkish Apartments =

Historic building in Portland, Oregon, U.S.

- U.S. National Register of Historic Places
- U.S. Historic district – Contributing property
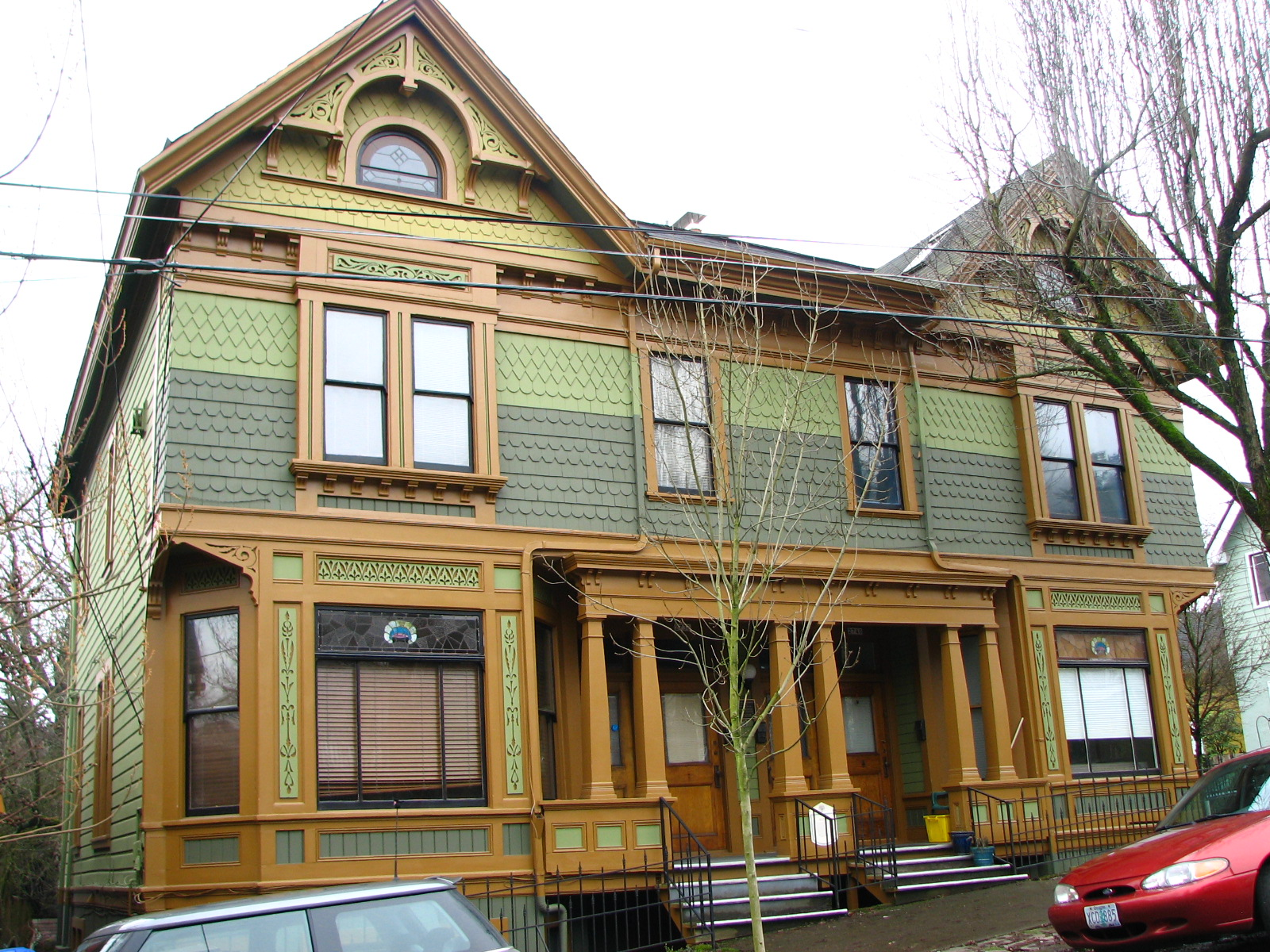
- Building's exterior, 2009

- Location within Portland, Oregon Location within Oregon Location within the United States
- Location: 2734–2740 SW 2nd Avenue; Portland, Oregon
- Coordinates: 45°30′11″N 122°40′46″W
- Built: 1890
- Architectural style: Queen Anne
- Part of: South Portland Historic District (ID98000951)
- NRHP reference No.: 81000514
- Added to NRHP: December 2, 1981

The Corkish Apartments is a building complex located in southwest Portland, Oregon listed on the National Register of Historic Places.

== See also ==
- National Register of Historic Places listings in Southwest Portland, Oregon
