= Bowles–Cooley House =

Historic house in Colorado, United States

- U.S. National Register of Historic Places
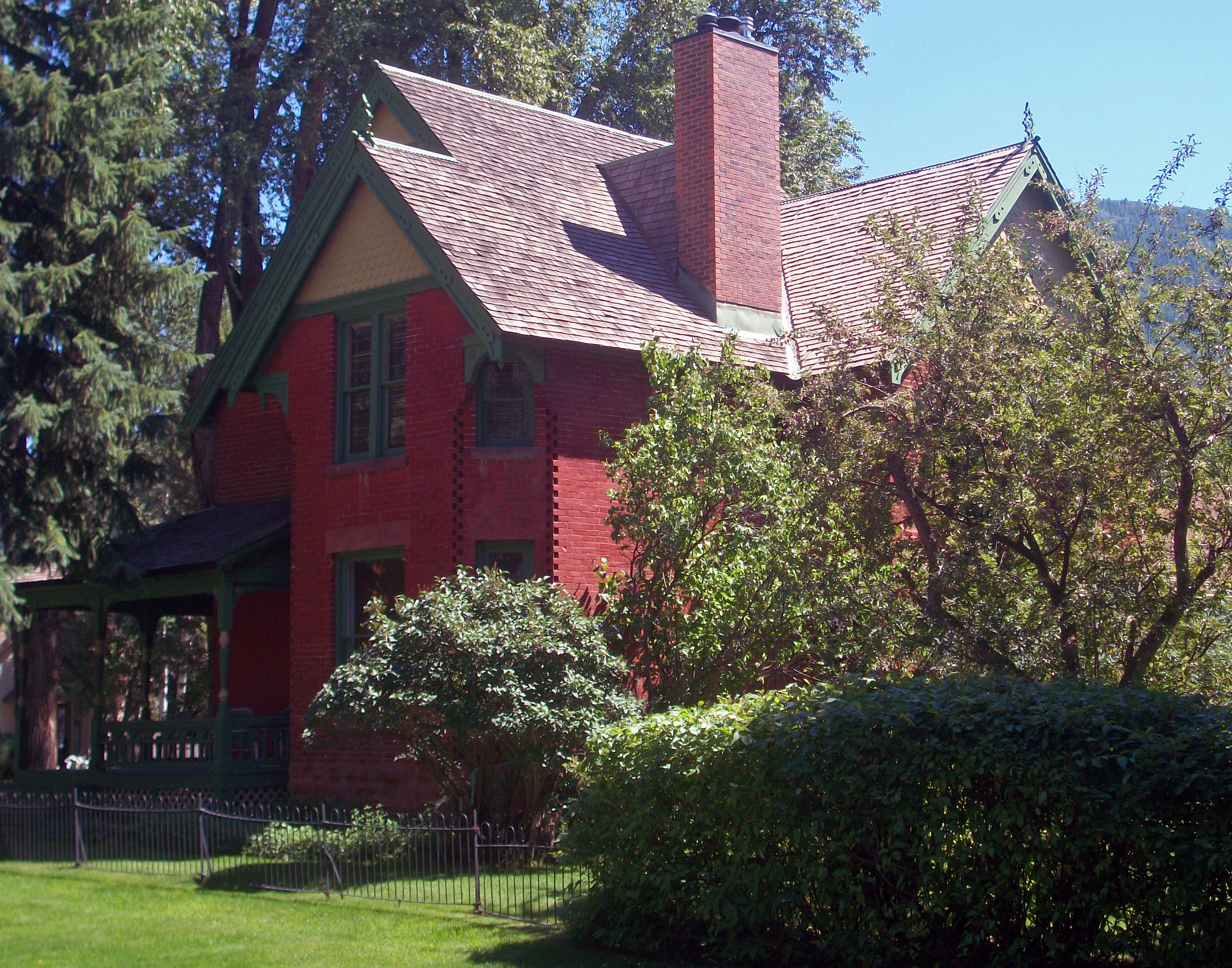
- North elevation and west profile, 2010

- Location within Colorado
- Location: Aspen, CO
- Coordinates: 39°11′38″N 106°49′24″W
- Built: 1889
- Architect: Ryland Bowles
- Architectural style: Queen Anne
- MPS: Historic Resources of Aspen
- NRHP reference No.: 87000188
- Added to NRHP: March 6, 1987

The Bowles–Cooley House is located at the corner of West Francis and North First streets in Aspen, Colorado, United States. It is a brick structure in the Queen Anne architectural style built during the 1880s. In 1987 it was listed on the National Register of Historic Places along with many other historic properties in the city.

It is one of the few large brick houses built in Aspen during its early boomtown era, and one of the largest houses built in the city's West End. The name comes from its first two residents, a local lumber merchant who built it and a mining lawyer. Many years later it would be the home of Red Rowland, vice president of the Aspen Skiing Company and manager of the Aspen Mountain ski area. It is considered an excellent local example of the Queen Anne style, and has been preserved relatively intact. It continues to be a private residence.

== Building ==
The house is located on the southwest corner of the intersection, in Aspen's residential West End near the north end of the city's grid plan streets. Neighboring properties are all houses of generally more modern vintage; an exception is the Davis Waite House, also listed on the National Register, across the street at the other end of the block. Mature trees on all lots provide shade complementary to that already provided by Aspen Mountain to the south. The land remains level, sloping minimally towards the Roaring Fork River 600 feet (180 m) to the northeast.

A small iron fence sets off the property from the street. The building itself is a three-story brick structure on a rusticated sandstone foundation. It rises three stories to a steeply pitched cross-gabled roof covered in shingles pierced by a tall, large rectangular chimney on the west side. Within the north (front) facade the eastern portion projects, topped by a similar gable, with two diagonal facades connecting it to the main facade. A shed-roofed wooden porch with turned balusters and posts wraps around the northeast corner. On the rear is a one-story kitchen wing[ a two-story extension projects from the east.

Windows are tall, narrow one-over-one double-hung sash with sandstone sills and wooden surrounds. Next to the entrance is an arched stained glass window. The east face has a shed-roofed bay window with stone brackets below. On the second story the lintels are topped with a wooden course which separates the brick siding from fish-scale wooden shingles above. At the roofline the gables have decorated wooden vergeboards. Brackets support either end of the projecting section, and all gable ends have a small ball finial. The projecting and cross-gable are further topped with a wooden decoration.

The interior of the house retains much of its original woodwork. Much of it is golden oak and hand-grained mahogany. The main staircase has oak paneling, turned balusters on the railings and newel posts with carved wood insets. In the living room, the fireplace mantel is oak with a plate glass mirror behind it. Its floor has an unusual pattern of quarter-sawn limed oak with boards running parallel to the angled walls and decreasing in length near the center of the room. The dining room has its original brass light fixtures.

== History ==
From a small collection of tents and log cabins in the late 1870s, Aspen grew into a city of thousands during the 1880s. The Colorado Silver Boom drew miners and others into the upper Roaring Fork Valley, all hoping to share in the prosperity. One of the latter was Ryland R. Bowles, who sold lumber and built houses. By 1889 he had made enough money to build the house in the city's West End, where many of its other early rich settled. Its asymmetrical massing and cross-gables were hallmarks of the Queen Anne Style then newly popular.

Two years later the house became the property of William Cooley, a lawyer who represented local mining interests. In 1893 Aspen's prosperity ended when, responding to that year's economic crisis, Congress repealed the Sherman Silver Purchase Act. With the U.S. government no longer required to buy silver, the market contracted and many of Aspen's mines closed.

The next half-century was a period known in the city's history as "the quiet years". Its population steadily declined along with its economic opportunities. Many of the buildings from its boom years fell vacant, and eventually succumbed to fire or neglect abetted by the effects of severe winters at almost 8,000 feet (2,400 m) above sea level in a remote mountain valley. The Bowles–Cooley House did not, and when the city's fortunes reversed as it developed into a popular ski resort, it was in good enough shape to be the home of Red Rowland, a vice president of the Aspen Skiing Company and manager of the ski area.

== See also ==
- National Register of Historic Places listings in Pitkin County, Colorado
