= Goldendale Free Public Library =

- Goldendale Community Library
- U.S. National Register of Historic Places
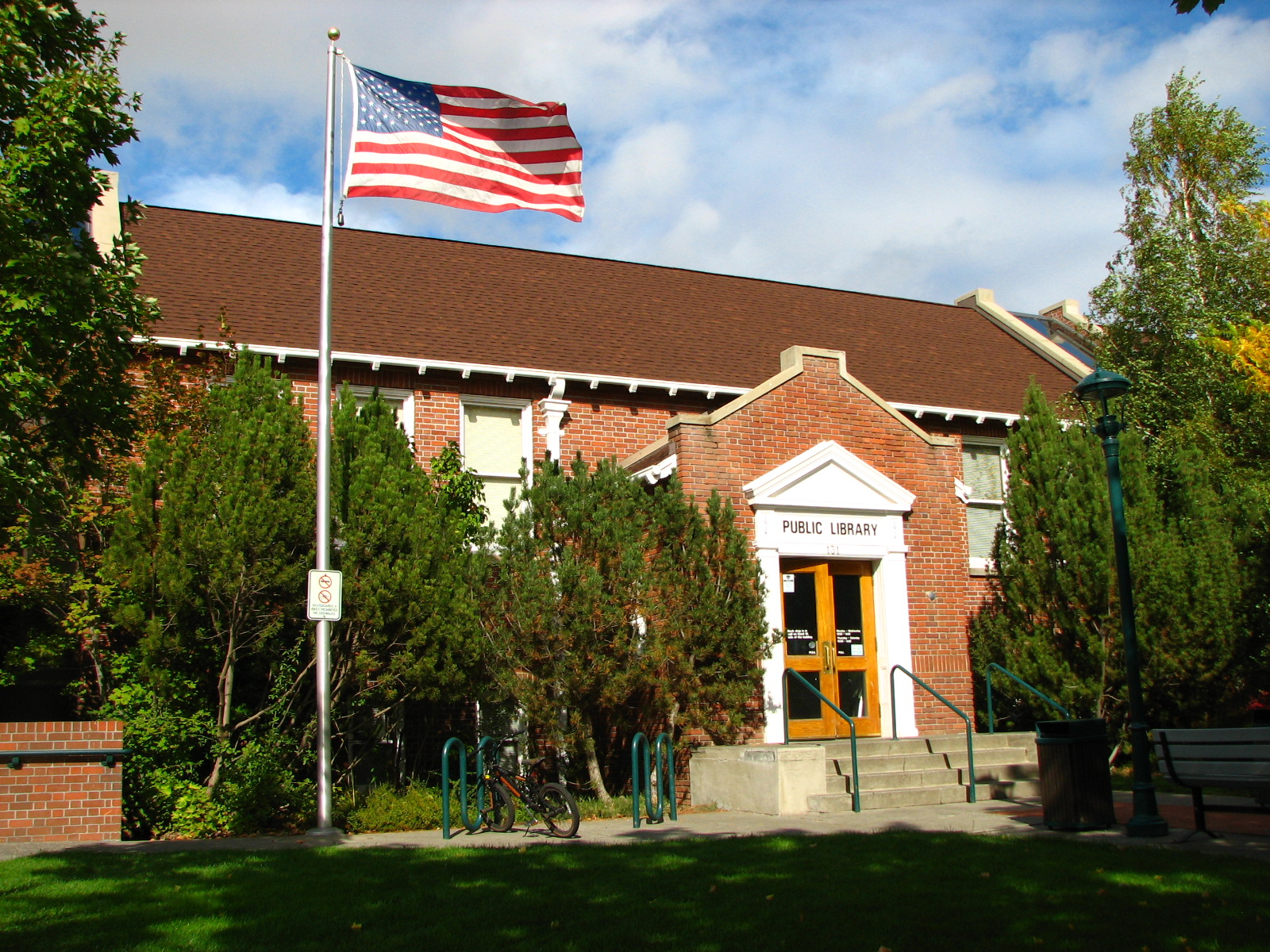

- Location within Washington (state) Location within the United States
- Location: 131 W. Burgen, Goldendale, Washington
- Coordinates: 45°49′15″N 120°49′22″W
- Area: less than one acre
- Built: 1914
- Architect: Doyle & Patterson
- MPS: Carnegie Libraries of Washington TR
- NRHP reference No.: 82004259
- Added to NRHP: August 3, 1982

The Goldendale Free Public Library in Goldendale, Washington is a historic Carnegie library which is listed on the U.S. National Register of Historic Places.

The library was a project of the Women's Association, a Federated Women's Clubs chapter.

It is a 50 feet (15 m) by 80 feet (24 m) brick building in a residential area near downtown. The gables of its roof have circular openings for attic ventilation and parapets above.

It is one of many Carnegie libraries that are listed on the National Register.
