= Joseph R. Bowles House =

Historic building in Portland, Oregon, U.S.

- U.S. National Register of Historic Places
- Portland Historic Landmark
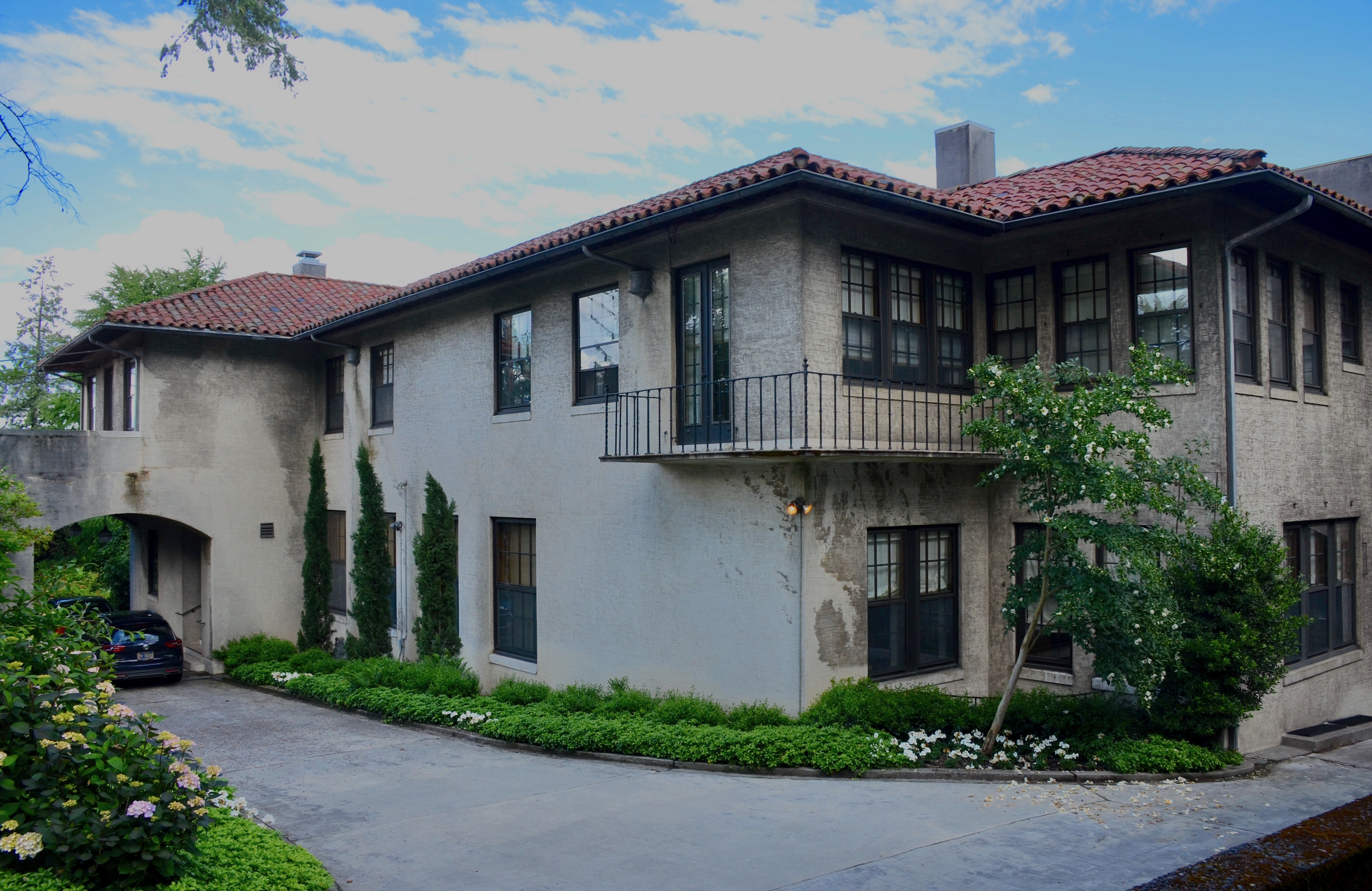
- Front and south side in 2021

- Location within Portland, Oregon
- Location: 1934 SW Vista Avenue; Portland, Oregon
- Coordinates: 45°30′47″N 122°41′48″W
- Built: 1922
- Architect: A. E. Doyle
- Architectural style: Late 19th and 20th Century Revivals, Italian Renaissance
- NRHP reference No.: 78002309
- Added to NRHP: March 8, 1978

The Joseph R. Bowles House is a house located in southwest Portland, Oregon, that is listed on the National Register of Historic Places.

The Bowles house is a 11267 sq. ft. two-story reinforced concrete building with Spanish tile roof and Italian marble columns. The house is an example of 1920s craftsmanship wherein expense was no barrier.

== See also ==
- National Register of Historic Places listings in Southwest Portland, Oregon
