= Harmon–Neils House =

Historic building in Portland, Oregon, U.S.

- U.S. National Register of Historic Places
- Portland Historic Landmark
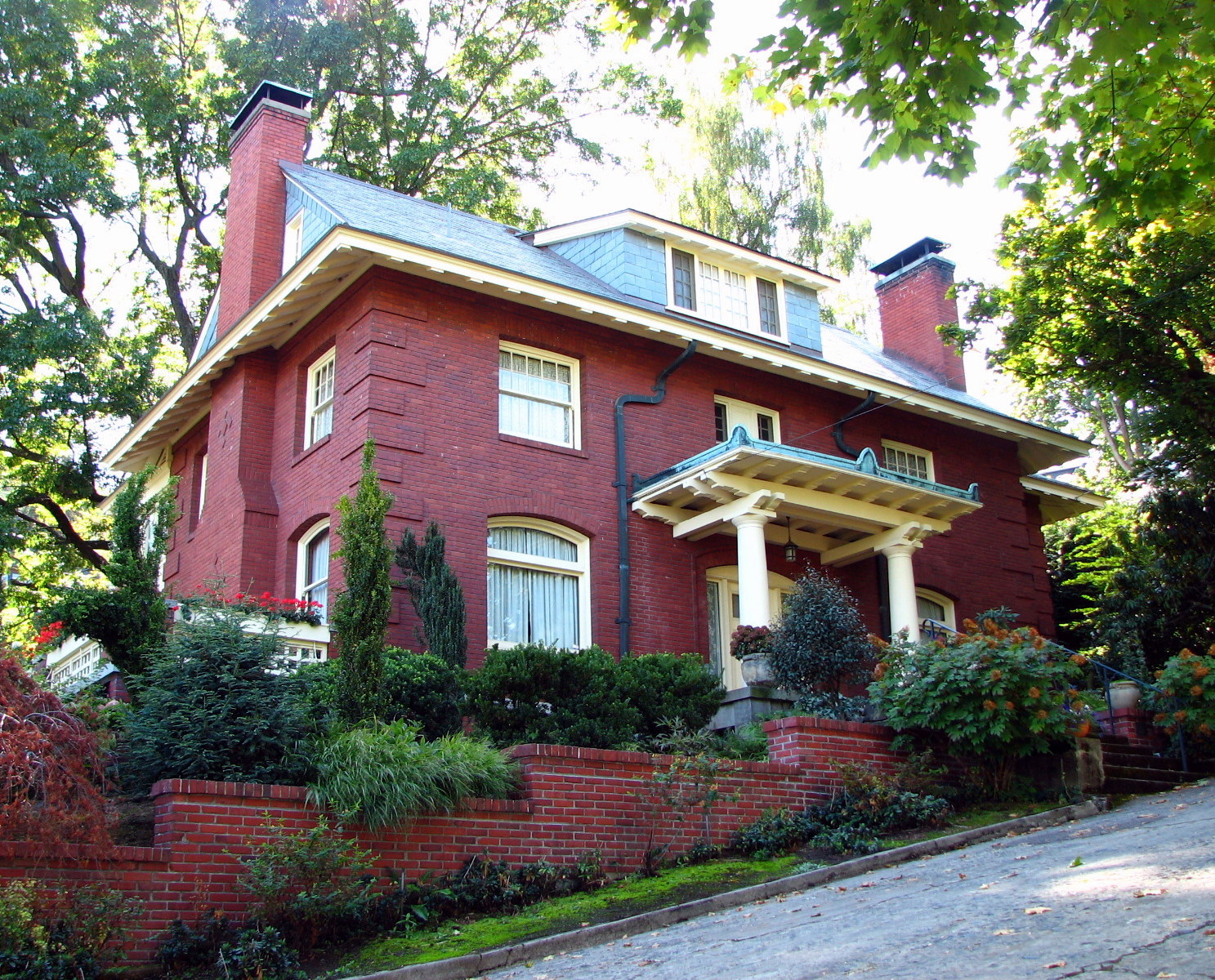

- Location within Portland, Oregon
- Location: 2642 NW Lovejoy Street; Portland, Oregon
- Coordinates: 45°31′45″N 122°42′19″W
- Built: 1908
- Architect: Doyle & Patterson
- Architectural style: Colonial Revival, Bungalow/Craftsman
- NRHP reference No.: 84003080
- Added to NRHP: February 16, 1984

The Harmon–Neils House is a house located in northwest Portland, Oregon, listed on the National Register of Historic Places.

== See also ==
- National Register of Historic Places listings in Northwest Portland, Oregon
