= Pittock Block =

Historic building in Portland, Oregon, U.S.

- U.S. National Register of Historic Places
- Portland Historic Landmark
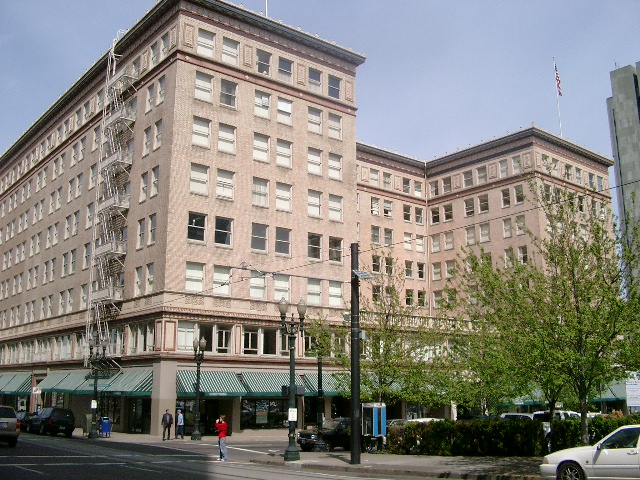
- View of the Washington Street face.

- Location within Portland, Oregon Location within Oregon Location within the United States
- Location: 921 SW Washington Street; Portland, Oregon
- Coordinates: 45°31′17″N 122°40′51″W
- Built: 1914/1923
- Architect: Doyle & Patterson
- Architectural style: Chicago school
- NRHP reference No.: 87001507
- Added to NRHP: September 8, 1987

The Pittock Block is a historic building in downtown Portland, Oregon, occupying a city block between SW 9th and 10th Avenues, SW Stark and Washington Streets, and west of O'Bryant Square.

== History ==
Before the Pittock Block was built, the site was occupied by the home of Henry L. Pittock, the publisher of The Oregonian. Pittock was preparing to move into the Pittock Mansion and leased the entire block to a California investor with the requirement that a "worthy" building named after Pittock would be built on the site.

In May 1913, architects Doyle, Patterson & Beach announced they had been awarded the $700,000 contract to construct the Pittock Block, with construction to begin immediately. According to a front-page story in the May 25, 1913, edition of The Oregonian:"One-half of the building will be eight stories in height, with frontage on the Washington Street side, while the Stark Street side will be three stories high. In addition to a deep basement there will be a sub-basement on the part of the block facing Tenth street. The Northwestern Electric Company, for which the structure is to be erected, will occupy a part of the West Park street side and all of the ground floor on the Stark Street side. The remainder of the ground floor will be designed for stores. The upper floors will be used for office purposes. The building will be of reinforced concrete construction."

Since 1987, it has been on the National Register of Historic Places.

== Tenants ==
The Pittock Block is home to a NWAX Point of Presence (Portland NAP), Portland's Internet exchange point. Former tenants of the Pittock Block include City Club of Portland and the administrative offices of the Oregon Symphony.

== See also ==
- Architecture of Portland, Oregon
- National Register of Historic Places listings in Southwest Portland, Oregon
