= Oregon Electric Railway Passenger Station =

Former interurban railway station in Eugene

- U.S. National Register of Historic Places
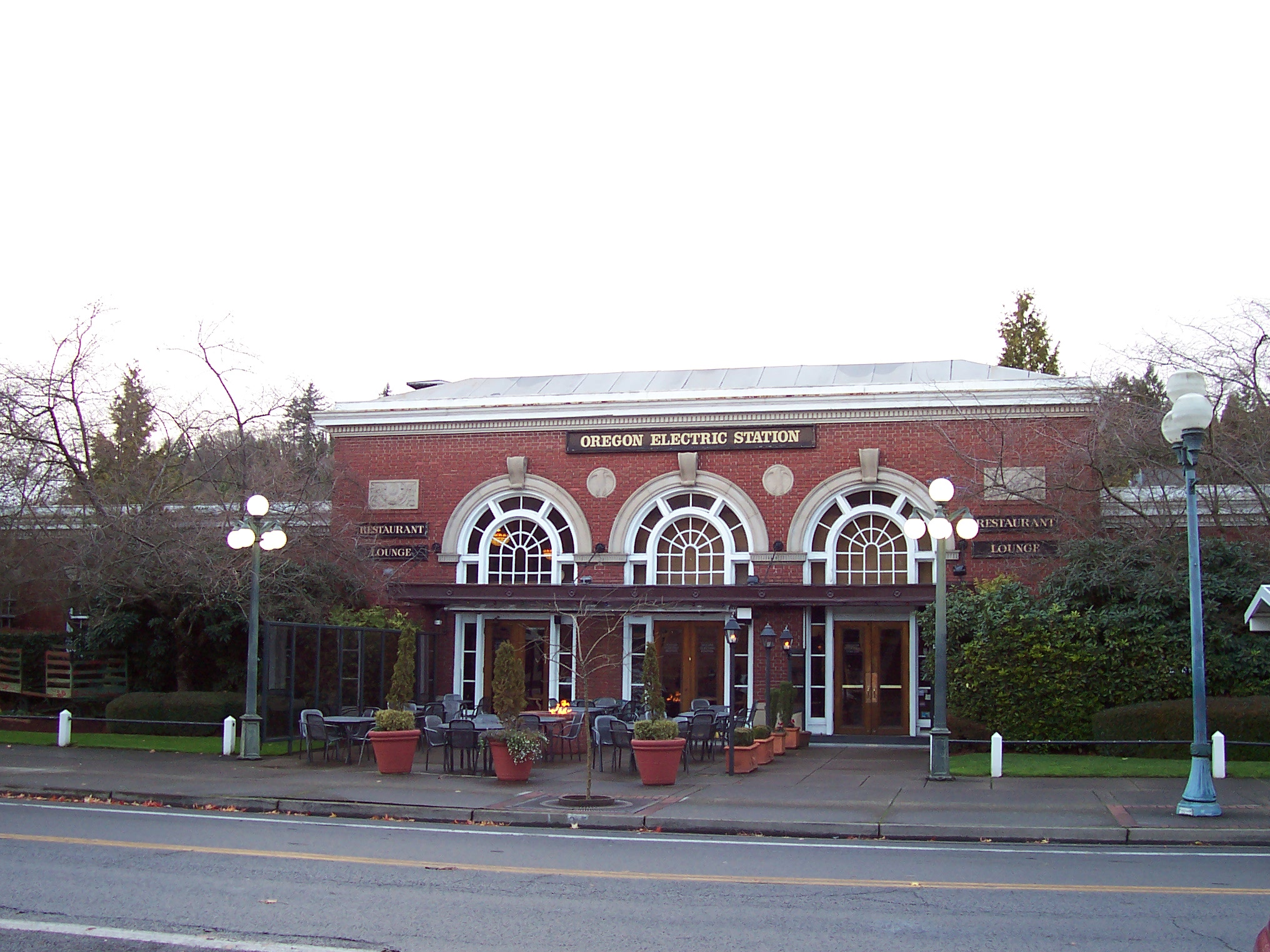

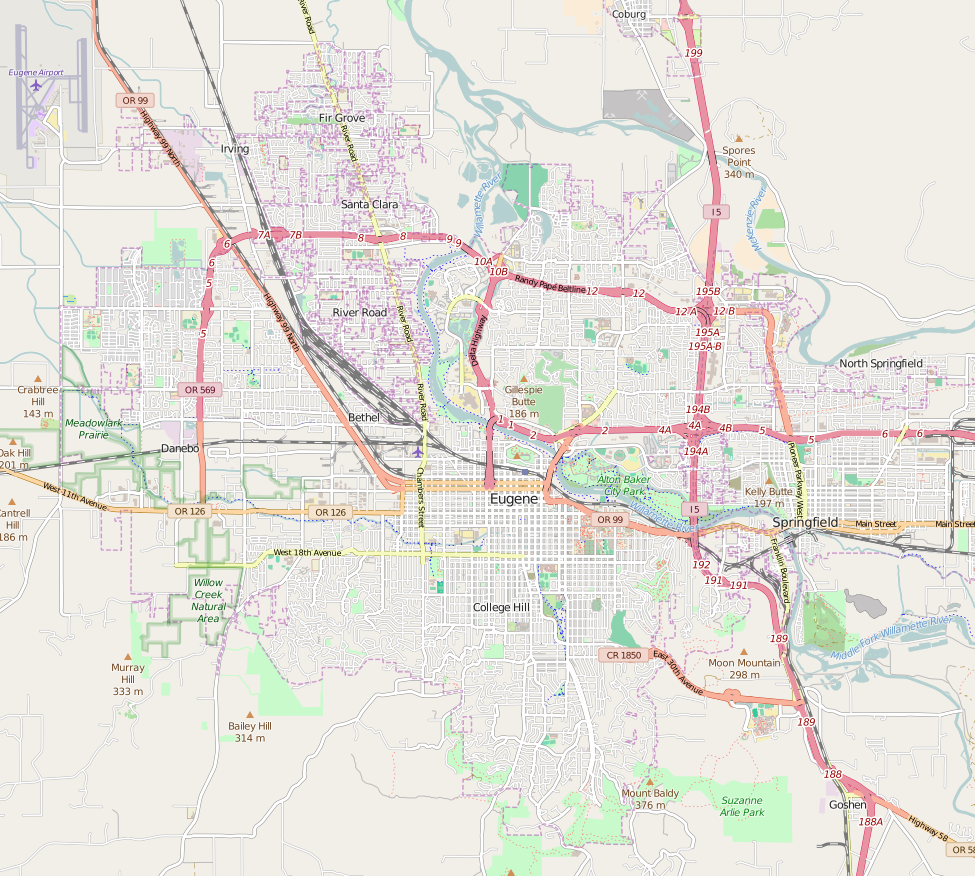
- Location within Eugene OR Location within Oregon
- Location: Eugene, Oregon, USA
- Coordinates: 44°03′16″N 123°05′32″W
- Built: 1914
- Architect: A. E. Doyle
- Architectural style: Georgian Revival
- NRHP reference No.: 79002087
- Added to NRHP: March 13, 1979

The Oregon Electric Railway Passenger Station is a historic railroad station in Eugene, Oregon, United States. It was built in 1914 as a station for the Oregon Electric Railway and was designed by A. E. Doyle.

Passenger service by the Oregon Electric Railway was discontinued in 1933, and the station was used as an office and for storage.

Slate Tractor opened an Allis-Chalmers dealership in Eugene on October 22, 1937 with a temporary location on 7th Avenue, moving to the Oregon Electric Station building February 3, 1938. On July 15, 1938, Edward C. (E.C.) Papé purchased the dealership, starting what is now known as The Papé Group, Inc. E.C. operated his dealership at the station for a little over three years before relocating the business to West 1st Street.

In 1967, the Southwest Oregon Museum of Science and Industry (SWOMSI), originally a branch of the Oregon Museum of Science and Industry (OMSI), purchased the station for $150. SWOMSI moved out of the station in May 1977, relocating temporarily to Springfield while its new building in Alton Baker Park was under construction. The station was sold, and $50,000 was put toward construction of the new building, which opened in 1980 under SWOMSIs new name, the Willamette Science and Technology Center (WISTEC). Today the museum is known as the Eugene Science Center.

SWOMSI's displays included train cars adjacent to the building. The train cars became part of the dining facilities for later restaurants located in the station.

Work began to convert the station into a restaurant in 1977. The first restaurant in the space was called "Andy's Eugene Station".

The station was listed on the National Register of Historic Places, as the Oregon Electric Railway Passenger Station, in 1979.

The Oregon Electric Station restaurant operated in the station until permanently closing in 2020. In 2021, the Lane County History Museum was looking at moving from its original location next to the Lane County Fairgrounds to the station. Portland-based restaurant chain The Old Spaghetti Factory opened in the space on January 10, 2024.

== See also ==
- Eugene station (Amtrak) — adjacent mainline railroad station also on the NRHP

Preceding station	Oregon Electric Railway	Following station
Terminus	Main Line	Lasen toward Portland
