= Nodoguro =

Japanese restaurant in Portland, Oregon, U.S.

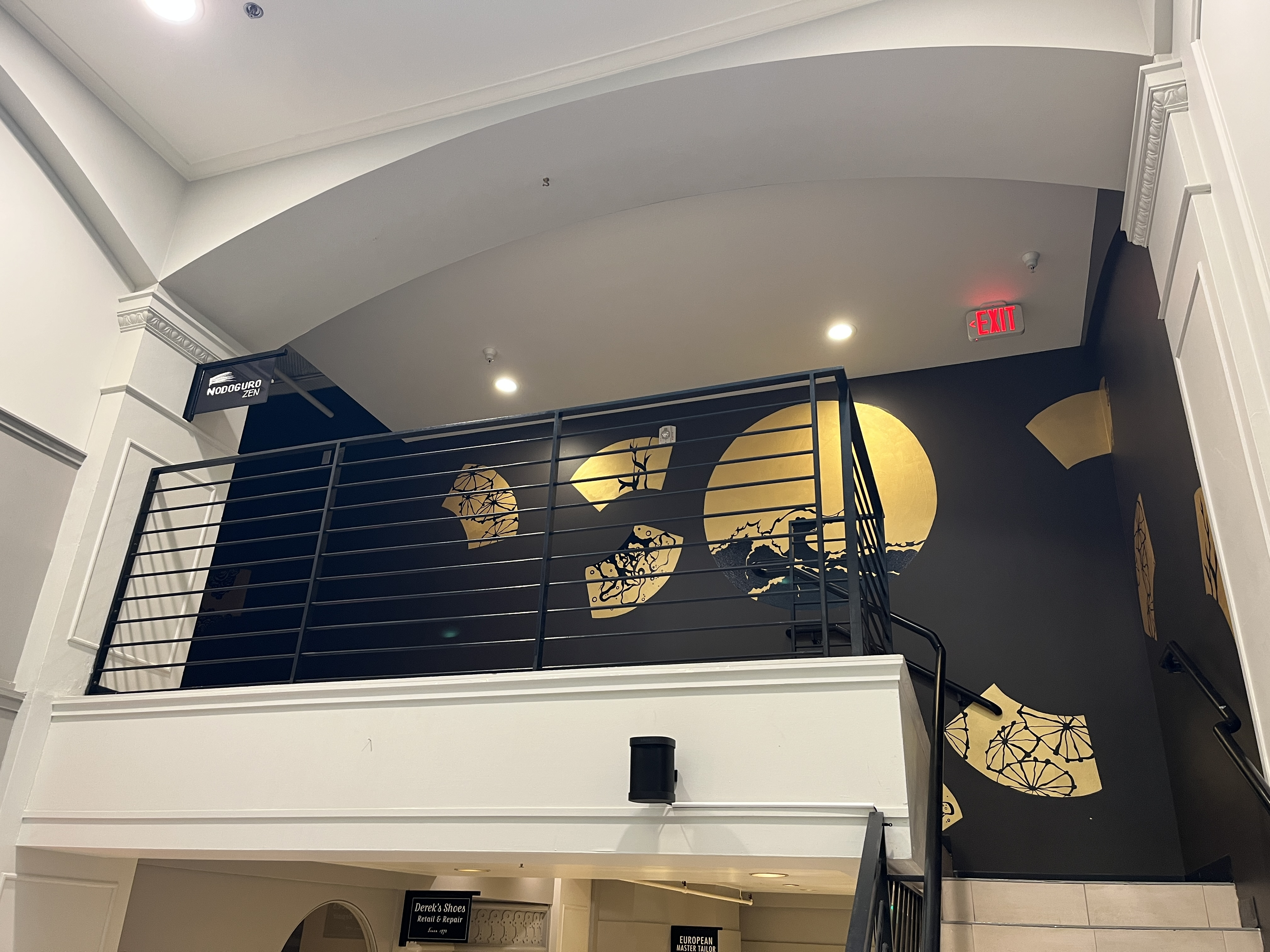
- View of the entrance restaurant from the first floor of the Morgan Building, 2025

Restaurant information
- Established: 2014
- Owners: Ryan and Elena Roadhouse
- Food type: Japanese
- Location: Portland, Oregon, United States
- Website: nodoguropdx.com

Nodoguro is a Japanese restaurant in Portland, Oregon, United States. The fine dining restaurant started as a pop-up in 2014, then moved into the Genoa Building in southeast Portland's Sunnyside neighborhood in 2016. Nodoguro relocated to the Morgan Building in downtown Portland in 2025.

== Description ==
The fine dining restaurant Nodoguro serves Japanese cuisine in Portland, Oregon. According to Eater Portland, "Nodoguro's ephemeral tasting menus have taken inspiration from Japanese record bars, pop culture, Spanish culinary traditions, and seasonal Oregon vegetables, with additional one-off events like sake dinners and handroll nights."

The menu has included abalone, katsuobushi-scented jellied broth over Dungeness crab, sake, sushi, uni risotto, and miso butter cookies. The restaurant has also served somen noodles with a raw oyster in a ginger broth, Japanese eggplant poached in miso with duck, and wagyu steak.

== History ==
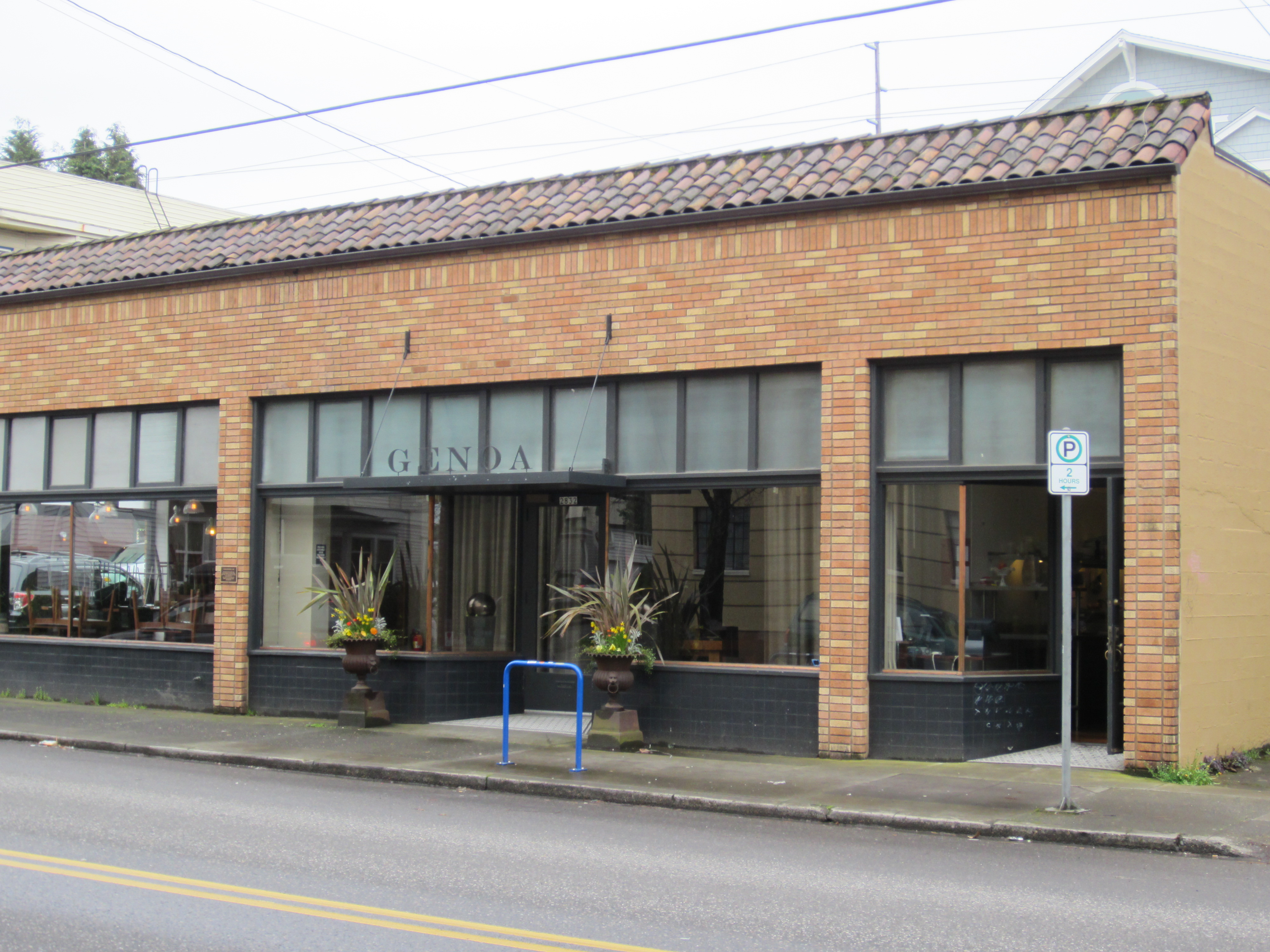
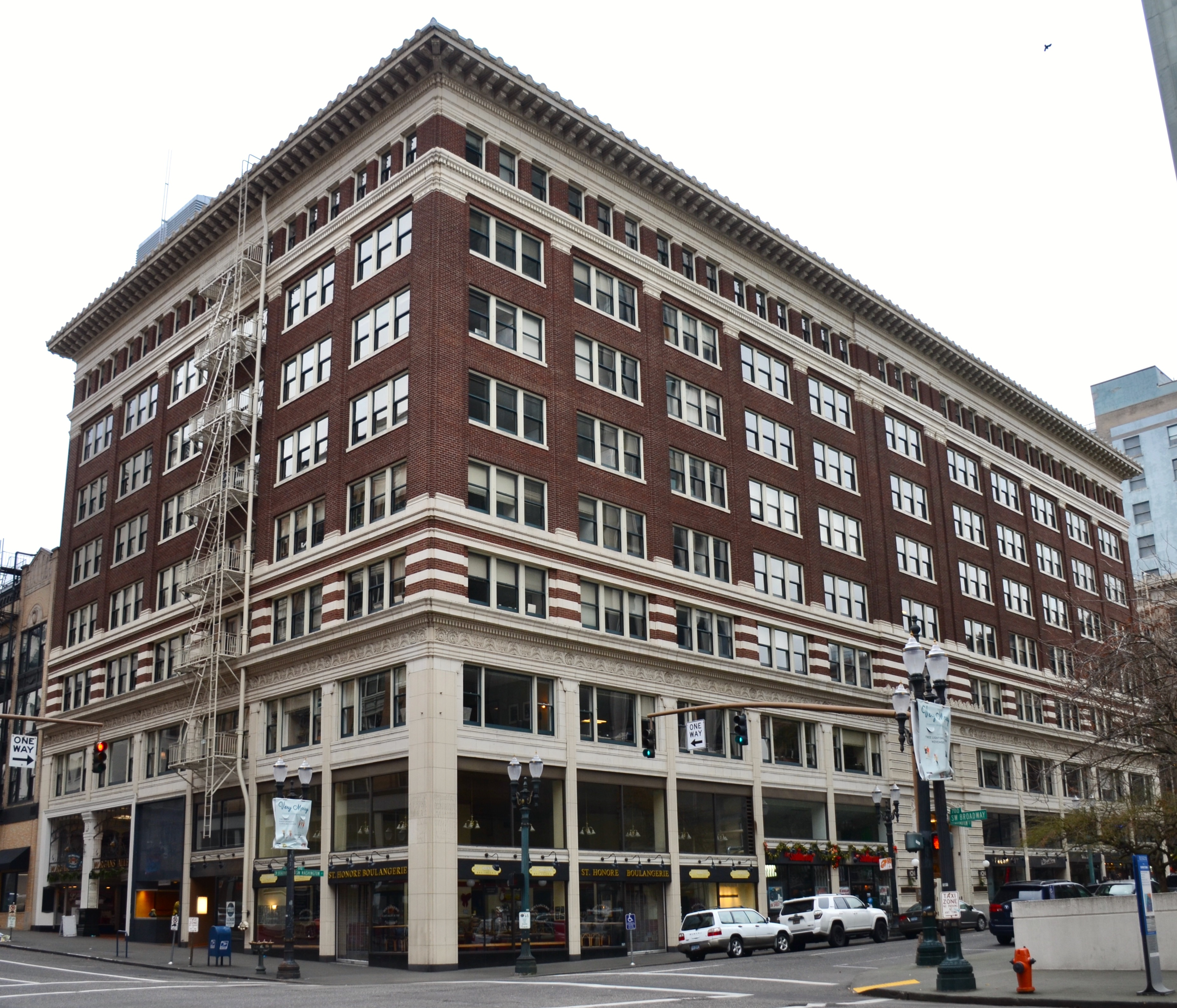
Nodoguro has operated from the Genoa Building (top, pictured in 2012) in southeast Portland's Sunnyside neighborhood and the Morgan Building (bottom, pictured in 2018) in downtown Portland

Ryan and Elena Roadhouse are the owners of Nodoguro, which started as a pop-up restaurant in 2014. In 2016, the business moved into the Genoa Building on Belmont Street in southeast Portland's Sunnyside neighborhood. During the COVID-19 pandemic, Nodoguro pivoted by offering bento-style take-out, but ended up closing. The business reopened in the northeast Portland part of the Kerns neighborhood in 2022.

In January 2025, the business announced plans to relocate to the Morgan Building in downtown Portland, in the space previously occupied by Roe and Tercet. The Roadhouses planned to open in the new location on Valentine's Day (February 14).

In 2026, Nodoguro was among local restaurants, community organizations, and other businesses that joined the "We Are Rip City" campaign in support of the Moda Center renovation project.

Nodoguro has sourced fished from Tokyo's Tsukiji fish market.

== Reception ==
Nodoguro was named Restaurant of the Year by Portland Monthly in 2015 and in 2026. In his 2018 review for The Oregonian, Michael Russell said, "The through line here is outstanding food. If you can afford the $195 per person price -- Portland's most expensive recurring meal -- the SupaHardcore nights are among the most singular dining experiences in Portland, a modern take on kaiseki more likely to exist in a much larger city." Nodoguro was named Portland's Best Restaurant in 2023, 2024, and 2026 in Russell's best restaurant list in The Oregonian. He ranked the business number 4 in the newspaper's 2025 list of Portland's 40 best restaurants.

In 2018, Eater Portland's Mattie John Bamman wrote, "If you're looking for upscale, mindbogglingly imaginative sushi, this is the place... Its several-course dinners in a minimalist, almost intimidatingly serene space, juxtaposed with small plates like uni risotto as comforting as Kraft mac and cheese, make Nodoguro both playful and completely serious at the same time. If Bamboo is Portland's most famous sushi, Nodoguro is the most modern and refined." The website's Seiji Nanbu and Janey Wong included Nodoguro in a 2024 list of the best sushi restaurants in the Portland metropolitan area.

In 2015-2020, 2024, and 2025 Nodoguro earned Ryan Roadhouse a nomination in the Best Chefs: Northwest and Pacific category of the James Beard Foundation Awards. and was named a winner of this award in 2026. Ryan Roadhouse has also earned other chef accolades such as, Rising Star Chef in 2014 and a feature in Questlove's book about culinary creativity, Something to Food About. Hannah Wallace included the business in Condé Nast Traveler's 2025 list of Portland's 23 best restaurants. The business was included in Portland Monthly's 2025 list of 25 restaurants "that made Portland".

== See also ==
- List of Japanese restaurants
