= Genoa (restaurant) =

Defunct Italian restaurant in Portland, Oregon, U.S.

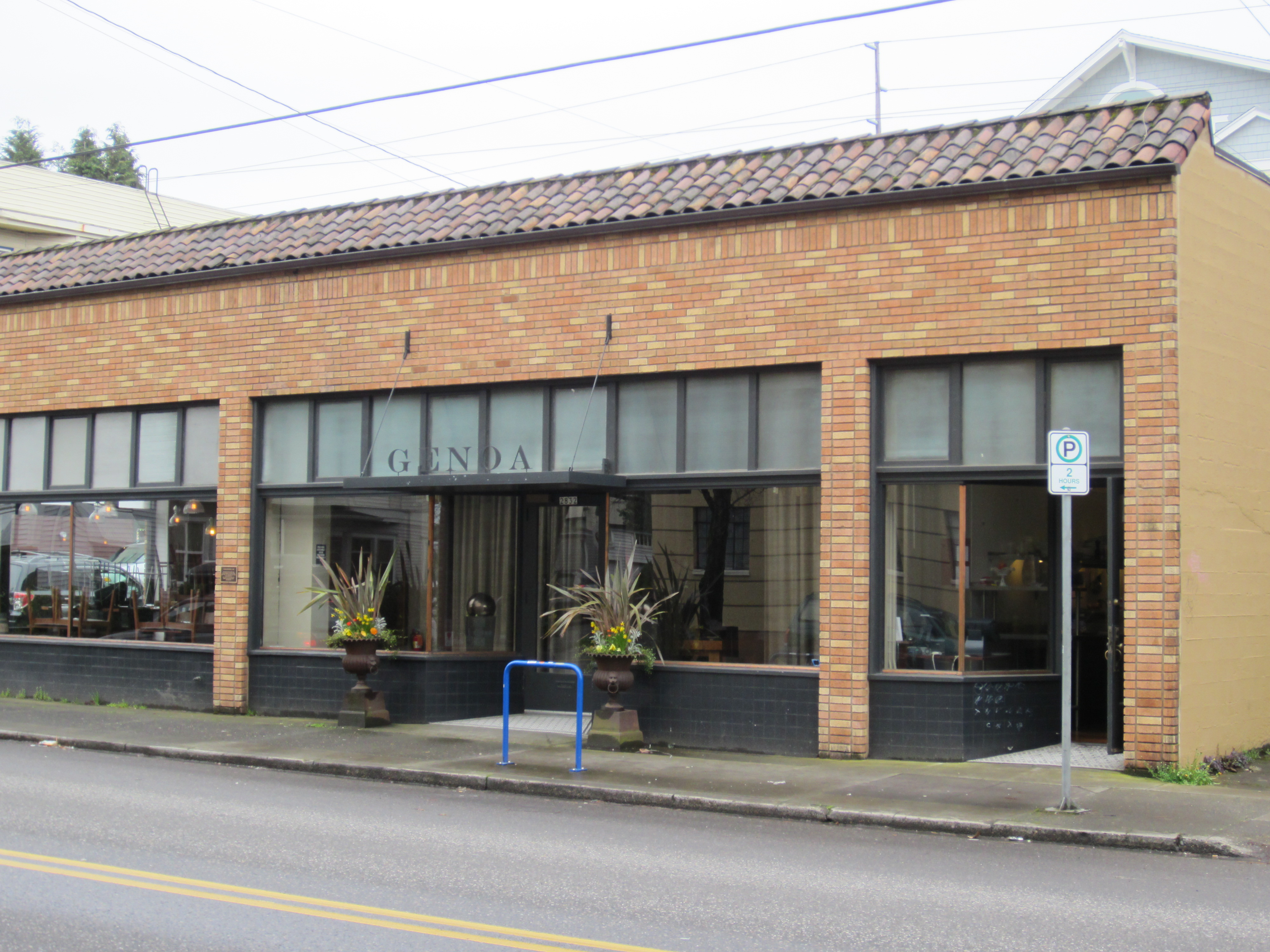
- Exterior of the restaurant, which has housed in the Genoa Building, in 2012
- Interactive map of Genoa

Restaurant information
- Established: 1971
- Food type: Italian
- Location: 2832 Southeast Belmont Street, Portland, Multnomah, Oregon, 97214, United States
- Coordinates: 45°30′58.8″N 122°38′10.9″W

Genoa was an Italian restaurant in Portland, Oregon, in the United States. Housed in the Genoa Building, the restaurant closed permanently in 2014. Laurie Wolf said Genoa "was at the forefront of Portland's changing food scene".

== Description ==
Genoa was an Italian restaurant housed on Belmont Street in the Genoa Building, in southeast Portland's Sunnyside neighborhood. Fodor's said, "The dining room's dark antique furnishings, long curtains, and dangling light fixtures lend it an air of sophistication, and with seating limited to under a few dozen diners, service is excellent."

In 2010, Patrick Alan Coleman of the Portland Mercury said of Genoa: "The restaurant has a feeling of cloistered austerity, shielded as it is from the street with heavy curtains. Inside, the dining room is all dark tones with an almost mortuary-like solemnity, save for the inoffensive selection of quiet modern music and chandeliers that break up the brown walls with nifty geometric shadows."

=== Menu ===
Genoa's menu changed seasonally. The restaurant served appetizers, salads, pastas, and desserts. The menu included duck breast with onions, apples, and arugula, as well as steelhead trout with brioche, caramelized yogurt, and butternut squash. Genoa also served foie gras.

The duck egg, served sous vide, was described by The Oregonian as "a setting sun of orange yolk pudding amid a landscape of pimenton-dyed croutons and asparagus shaved white up to their spear tips". The newspaper said, "Thin, rare-pink slices of 'corned' lamb were woven around dry chickpeas, hummus and dots of bright-green nasturtium leaf pesto." Genoa's version of strawberries and cream had berries "[alternating] with velvety tarragon-infused fromage blanc, all scattered with orange and purple nasturtium petals".

== History ==
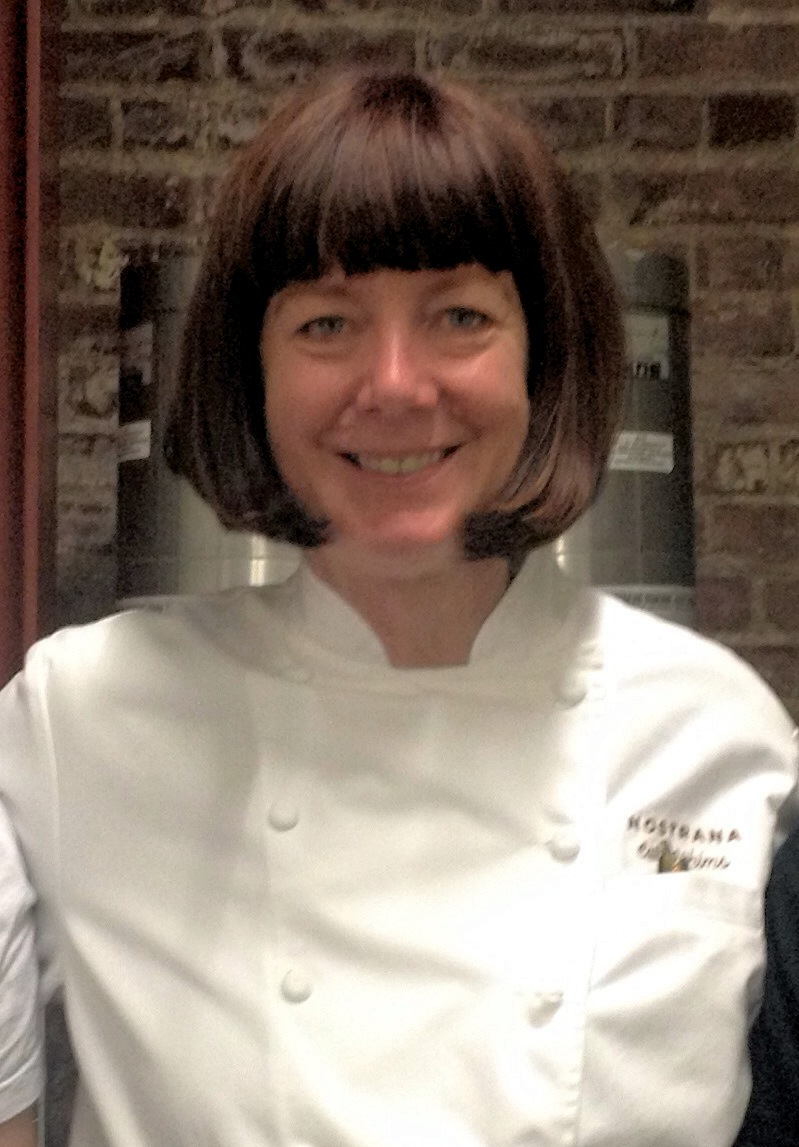
Genoa chef and owner Cathy Whims

Local restaurateur Michael Vidor opened Genoa in 1971. In an interview with The Oregonian, he said the restaurant's northern Italian cuisine "is nothing more than a dinner party you would have at home... one you gave a lot of thought to".

Former owners include Amelia Hard and Kerry DeBuse. Chef/owner Cathy Whims, who started at the restaurant as a dishwasher, left in 2002. Robert Reynolds was briefly a consulting executive chef in 2005. John Taboada, the chef-owner of Navarre, was a cook at Genoa.

=== First closure and reboot ===
Genoa closed in 2007 or 2008, and was rebooted in 2009, with David Anderson as executive chef. According to The Oregonian, "Once onboard, Anderson immersed himself in all things Genoa, visiting Italy for two weeks, poring over books of Genoa recipes and menus, and chatting with such kitchen alums as Nostrana chef Cathy Whims. The familiar 50-seat space was stripped to its skeleton, then rebuilt to resemble the original. New features are the dark blue and gold silk drapery, a fireplace in the main dining room and five stunning stained-glass chandeliers resembling wind chimes."

For New Year's Eve in 2009, Genoa offered caviar, truffles, roasted foie gras, and pheasant. In 2010, the restaurant hosted a four-course dinner following the International Association of Culinary Professionals ceremony. Anderson visited the White House in 2010, representing Portland in a ceremony launching Michelle Obama's Chefs Move to Schools program. For one evening in 2010, Genoa donated 15 percent of proceeds to the Virginia Garcia Foundation, which "provides health care and community services to migrant workers" in Washington and Yamhill Counties. Anderson represented Genoa in the 10-10-10 Portland Chef Face-Off, which raised money for the Leukemia & Lymphoma Society. Genoa also hosted Gus Van Sant for an event.

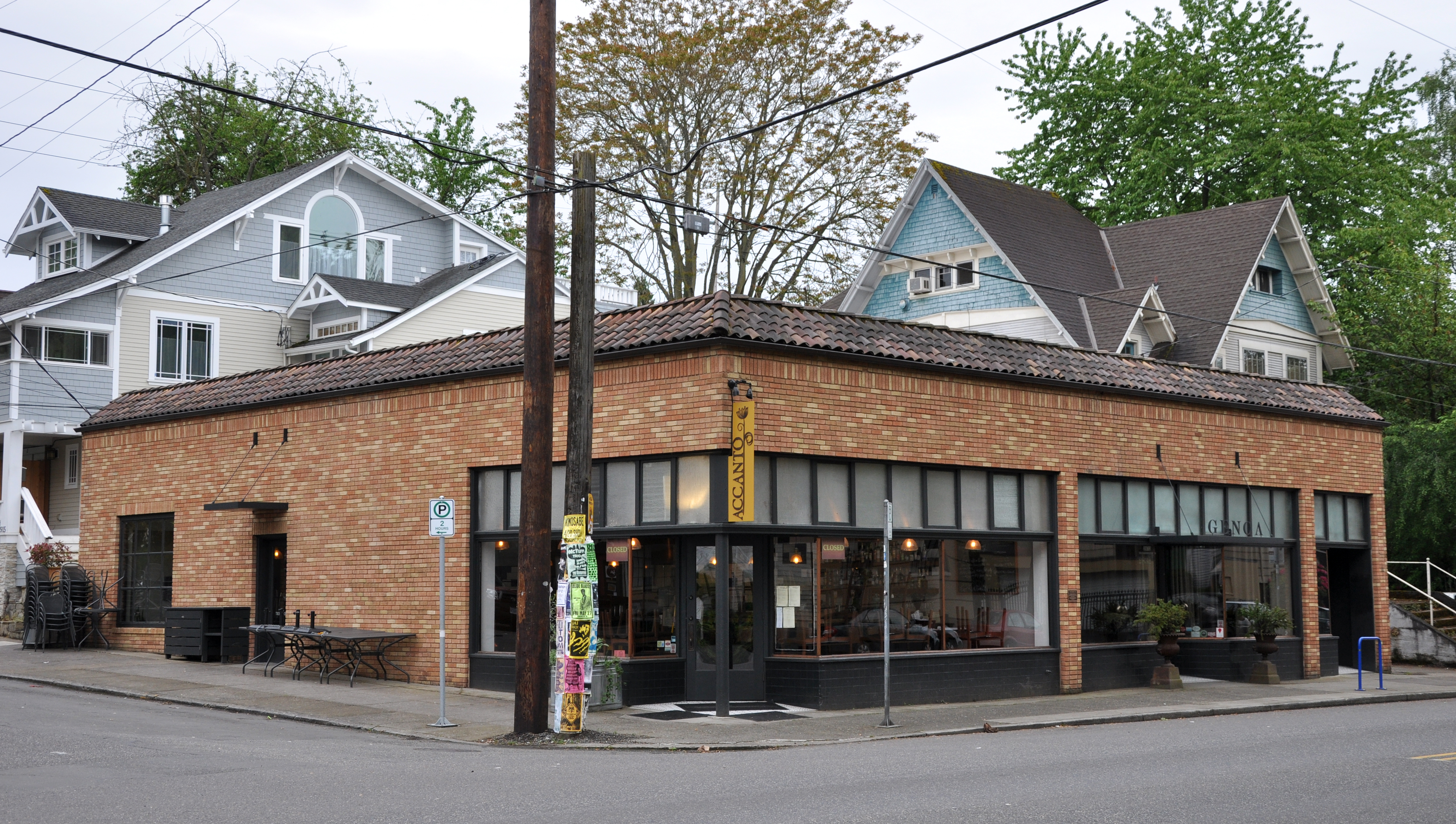
Genoa and neighboring restaurant Accanto in the Genoa Building in 2011

Daniel Mondok became a sous-chef in late 2010. In January 2011, he launched a new five course "Harvest menu" with all-vegetarian options. The vegetarian prix fixe included squash-puree soup, chard-stuffed pansotti, and lentil stew with wild mushrooms. Sommelier Michael Garofola joined Genoa in 2011. In February, Anderson hosted an open house at Genoa for Chefs Move to Schools on Presidents' Day. In April, Anderon and Mondok debuted a "$40, three-course menu available each weeknight, as a slightly more accessible option to the regular $60 five-course bill of fare". Mondok left Genoa in late 2011. In December, to commemorate the restaurant's fortieth anniversary, Genoa had a temporary menu that "revisits a classic from the archive of menus we have", according to Anderson.

In 2012, Anderson launched a monthly "guest chef" dinner series to collaborate with "chefs who are shaping the culinary landscape with a unique point of view". Gregory Gourdet of Departure Restaurant and Lounge participated in June; the two chefs collaborated on a "Silk Road-inspired" dinner. Jake Martin joined Genoa as chef de cuisine in December 2012. Upon Anderson's departure one month later to join Bluehour, Martin was named executive chef. He hosted an open house in early 2014, allowing guests to sample a new a la carte menu. The a la carte menu became permanent.

=== Permanent closure ===
Genoa closed permanently in 2014. The restaurant was affiliated with the restaurant Accanto. In 2018, Michael C. Zusman of Willamette Week wrote, "For years, Accanto was the neighborhood Italian side piece to Genoa, its storied sibling in Southeast Portland. When Genoa closed for good in 2014, Accanto faded even further into the background, frequented by neighbors but not many others." The space which housed Genoa remained empty for two years, until the restaurant Nodoguro opened.

== Reception ==
Fodor's said Genoa was "widely regarded as one of the finest restaurants in Portland". The business has also been described as "Portland's ultimate special-occasion restaurant".

David Sarasohn of The Oregonian gave Genoa a rating of 'A–' in 2008. The newspapers Michael Russell described Genoa as a "scene-defining fine-dining spot" and gave the restaurant a 'B' rating in 2013. Russell wrote, "This Genoa isn't quite the same as the Italian institution that served dreamy three-hour meals for nearly 40 years while producing several top Portland chefs. In 2008, that restaurant was pulled off life support, the victim of a sluggish economy and the city's changing tastes."

Opining on the chef, Russell said, "Martin dreams in Technicolor. The May menu, with most dishes presented in a tumble of colors following thick horizontal lines or graceful curves, offers some of the most vividly imagined plates in Portland." In 2014, he wrote, "In many ways, the relationship between Genoa and Accanto — a fine dining restaurant attached to a casual, popular and often more profitable sister — led the way for restaurants such as Roe (the high-end seafood restaurant behind Block + Tackle) and LangBaan (a Thai tasting menu behind a bookshelf at the back of PaaDee)."

In 2010, Patrick Alan Coleman of the Portland Mercury said Genoa "can feel like a kind of culinary museum" and said "the weighty interior was sometimes an odd contrast to a prix fixe menu of light Italian fare". In 2016, the newspaper's Heather Adndt Anderson said Genoa "transformed a defunct Mexican restaurant into one of Portland's most memorable dining destinations" and wrote, "the food they were making was revelatory, and the restaurant turned out culinary leviathans Cathy Whims (Nostrana), Tommy Habetz (Pizza Jerk, Bunk), and John Taboada (Navarre, Angel Face, Luce)".

In 2009, Michael Benjamin Thelin of Eater Portland called Genoa "Portland's most seminal eatery ever". The website's Mattie John Bamman called Genoa "iconic" and said the restaurant was "famous for bringing fine-dining and authentic Italian food to Portland in the 1970s". In 2022, Eater Portland's Brooke Jackson-Glidden said the legacy of the "late-great" Genoa and Nostrana "[loom] large over Portland's restaurant scene. In 2011, OpenTable included Genoa in a list of top 100 "best overall" restaurants. The survey was based on "feedback collected from OpenTable diners between December 2010 and November 2011", and Genoa was the only Portland restaurant to be included.

== See also ==
- List of Italian restaurants
