= Too Soon =

Too soon or Too Soon may refer to:

- Too Soon (bar), a cocktail bar in Portland, Oregon, US
- Too Soon: Comedy After 9/11, a 2021 documentary film
- Too Soon?, book by cartoon celebrity portraits by Drew Friedman (cartoonist)
- Too Soon, Season 8 Episode 17 of Doctors (2000 TV series)
- Too Soon, 2004 album by Matthew Jay
- "Too Soon", song by Animal Collective from their 2003 album Ark
- "Too Soon", song by DJ Vanic
- An audience comment to a joke made by Gilbert Gottfried after the September 11th attacks:
  - Humor based on the September 11 attacks

== See also ==
The dictionary definition of too soon at Wiktionary
