= Mercato Grove =

Commercial development in Lake Oswego, Oregon, U.S.

Location
- Interactive map of Mercato Grove
- Coordinates: 45°24′55″N 122°43′3″W
- Country: United States
- State: Oregon
- Location: Lake Oswego

Mercato Grove is a commercial development along Southwest Boones Ferry Road in Lake Oswego, Oregon, United States. Operated by Greystar, Mercato Grove has housing and retail spaces. The restaurants Grassa, Lardo, Oven and Shaker, and St. Jack have operated in the development.

== Housing ==
The occupancy rate of apartments at Mercato Grove is 92 percent, as of January 2015.

== Tenants ==
Tenants have included Body20, Fresh Faces RX, Orangetheory Fitness, and Sweathouz.

=== Restaurants ===
There were plans for six restaurants, as of 2021, including: Fills Donuts, Grassa, Lardo, Oven and Shaker, St. Jack, and Tasty.

Lac St. Jacks and Fills closed in 2022. Tasty was replaced by Toreados, which closed in 2023. Lardo closed on January 6, 2025.

Ovation Coffee has also operated in the development. The Whole Bowl and Sool Korean Kitchen are slated to open locations at Mercato Grove in 2025. Sool opened in April.
