= Oven and Shaker =

Restaurant in Portland, Oregon, U.S.

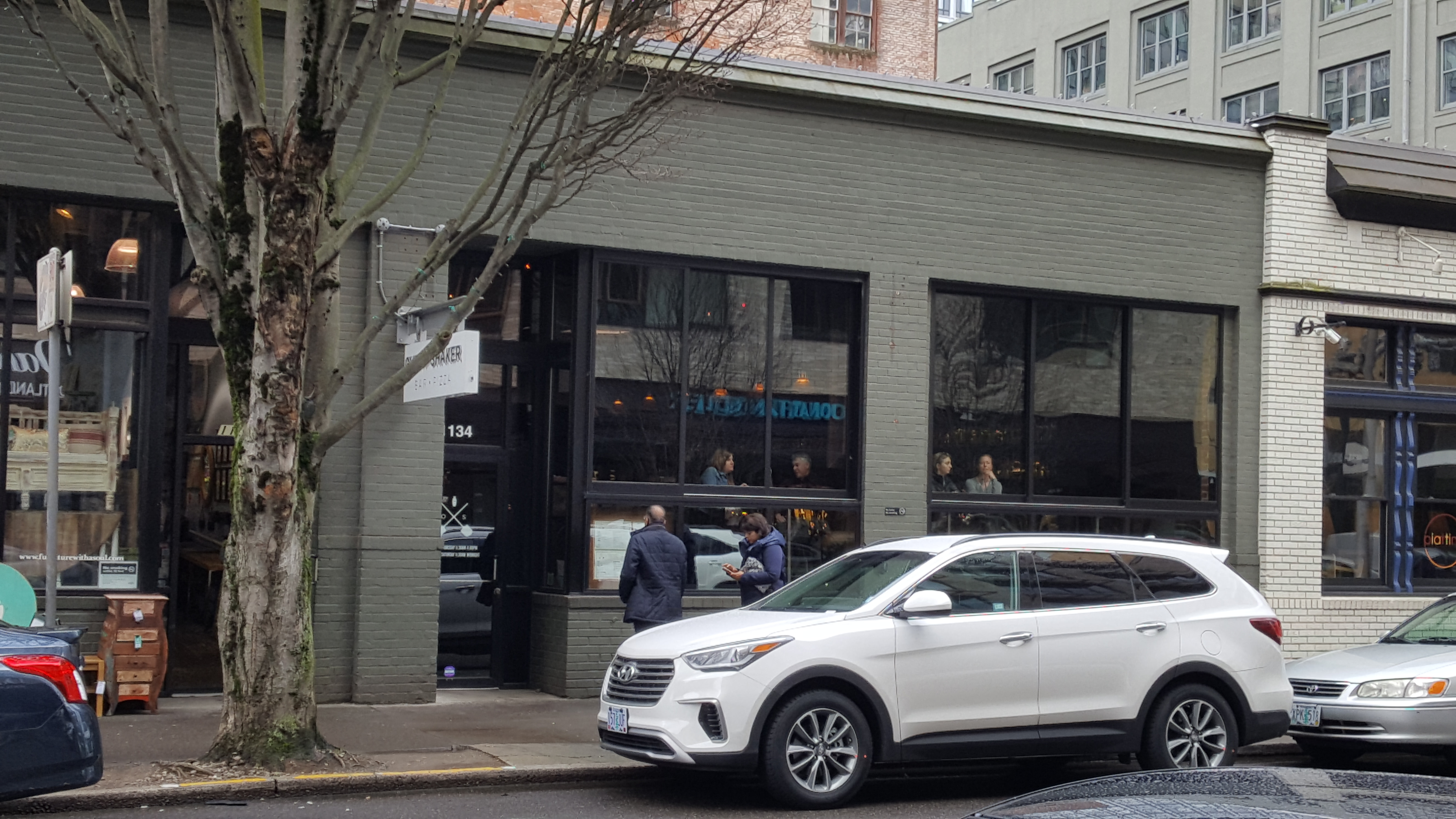
- The restaurant's exterior, 2017
- Interactive map of Oven and Shaker

Restaurant information
- Established: 2011
- Location: 1134 Northwest Everett Street, Portland, Multnomah, Oregon, 97209, United States
- Coordinates: 45.52495°N 122.68272°W
- Website: ovenandshaker.com

Oven and Shaker is a small chain of pizzerias in the Portland metropolitan area, in the U.S. state of Oregon. The original restaurant operates in northwest Portland's Pearl District and the business has also operated in Lake Oswego. Oven and Shaker has announced plans to operate at Portland International Airport and in Beaverton.

== Description ==
The base of the pizza is Neapolitan and the company specializes in exotic toppings such as pork belly, roasted corn, mascarpone, poblano peppers, blackberries, peaches, goat cheese, and arugula.

== History ==
The original restaurant opened in 2011. Plans for a second location in Beaverton were announced in October 2019. The business has also confirmed plans to operate at Portland International Airport.

Oven and Shaker operated at Mercato Grove in Lake Oswego from 2021 to 2025.

== Reception ==
Michael Russell included Oven and Shaker in The Oregonian's 2012 overview of Portland's best pizza. Similarly, Alex Frane included the business in Thrillist's 2020 overview of the city's "absolute best" pizza. Eater Portland included Oven and Shaker in a 2025 overview of the best bars and restaurants in the Pearl District.

== See also ==
- Cathy Whims
- List of Italian restaurants
- List of restaurant chains in the United States
- Pizza in Portland, Oregon
