= Too Soon (bar) =

Cocktail bar and restaurant in Portland, Oregon, U.S.

- Interactive map of Too Soon

Restaurant information
- Owners: Nick Flower; Adam Robinson
- Location: 18 Northeast 28th Avenue, Portland, Multnomah, Oregon, 97232, United States
- Coordinates: 45.5233°N 122.6371°W

Too Soon is a cocktail bar and restaurant in Portland, Oregon, United States. Owned by Nick Flower and Adam Robinson, Too Soon opened in December 2023 or January 2024. It has garnered positive reception.

== Description ==
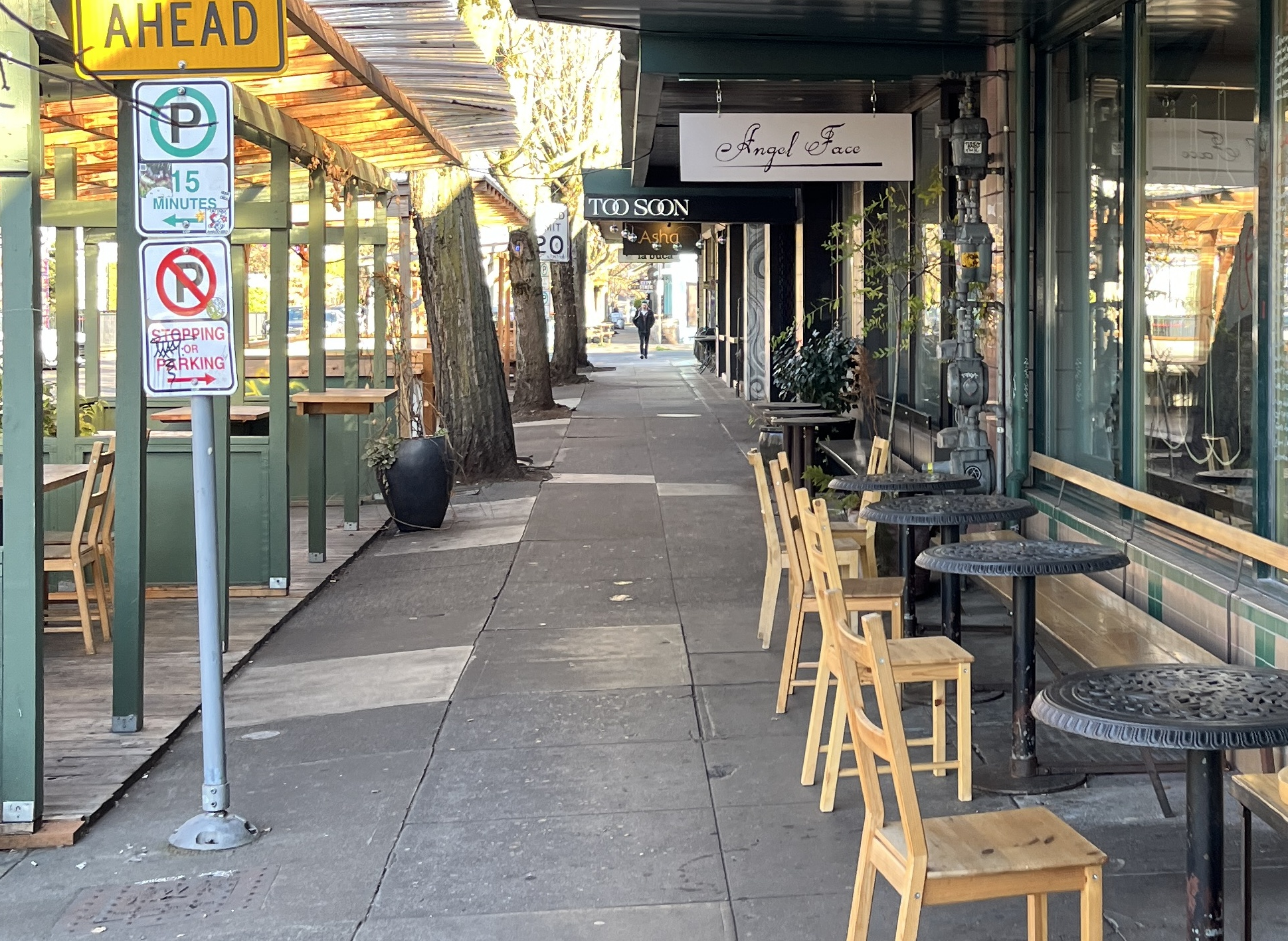
Too Soon operates on 28th Avenue (pictured in 2025) in the Kerns neighborhood of Portland, Oregon.

The "East Coast-inspired" cocktail bar and restaurant Too Soon, which is meant to "evoke the spirit of the New York City bar scene in the early aughts", operates on 28th Avenue in the northeast Portland part of the Kerns neighborhood. It neighbors the bar Angel Face.

The interior of Too Soon has a "geometric black beam ceiling, sleek modern bar, and black, white-outlined wallflower wallpaper get their hues from bisexual-tone LEDs", according to Willamette Week. The New York Observer says, "Inside, the sleek and contemporary furnishings are bathed in soft lighting, creating a cozy yet upscale ambiance."

=== Menu ===
Too Soon has a catalog of approximately 1,000 drinks, which are served in animal-inspired mugs. Drink options include dirty martinis and tonic and yuzu highballs. The absinthe and cognac-based Flash of Lightning has ginger, lime, and pomegranate, and the Horseradish & Apple has apple, horseradish, and a lemon peel garnish. The House Special has Tanqueray, basil, bell pepper, coconut, curry spices, and lime. Too Soon also serves freezer martinis with gin and vodka, as well as non-alcoholic drinks.

Food options include chicken Caesar salad wraps, fried chicken or sassafras BBQ pork sandwiches, hamachi crudo with pickled peppers and wasabi aioli, and French fries. Too Soon has also served mushroom fritters, poached prawns, and other snacks. For last call, the bar serves complimentary chocolate chip cookies.

== History ==
The bar opened in December 2023 or January 2024, in the space that previously housed Nightingale. Too Soon is owned by Nick Flower and Adam Robinson. Flower is also the beverage director. Jon "Bones" Anderson has been a chef at Toon Soon.

Too Soon has hosted the cocktail pop-ups Malpractice and Mi Amor.

== Reception ==
In 2025, Too Soon was nominated in the Best New U.S. Cocktail Bar (West Coast) category by Tales of the Cocktail. Alex Frane included the business in Portland Monthly's 2025 list of the city's best bars.
