= The Whole Bowl =

Restaurant chain based in Portland, Oregon, U.S.

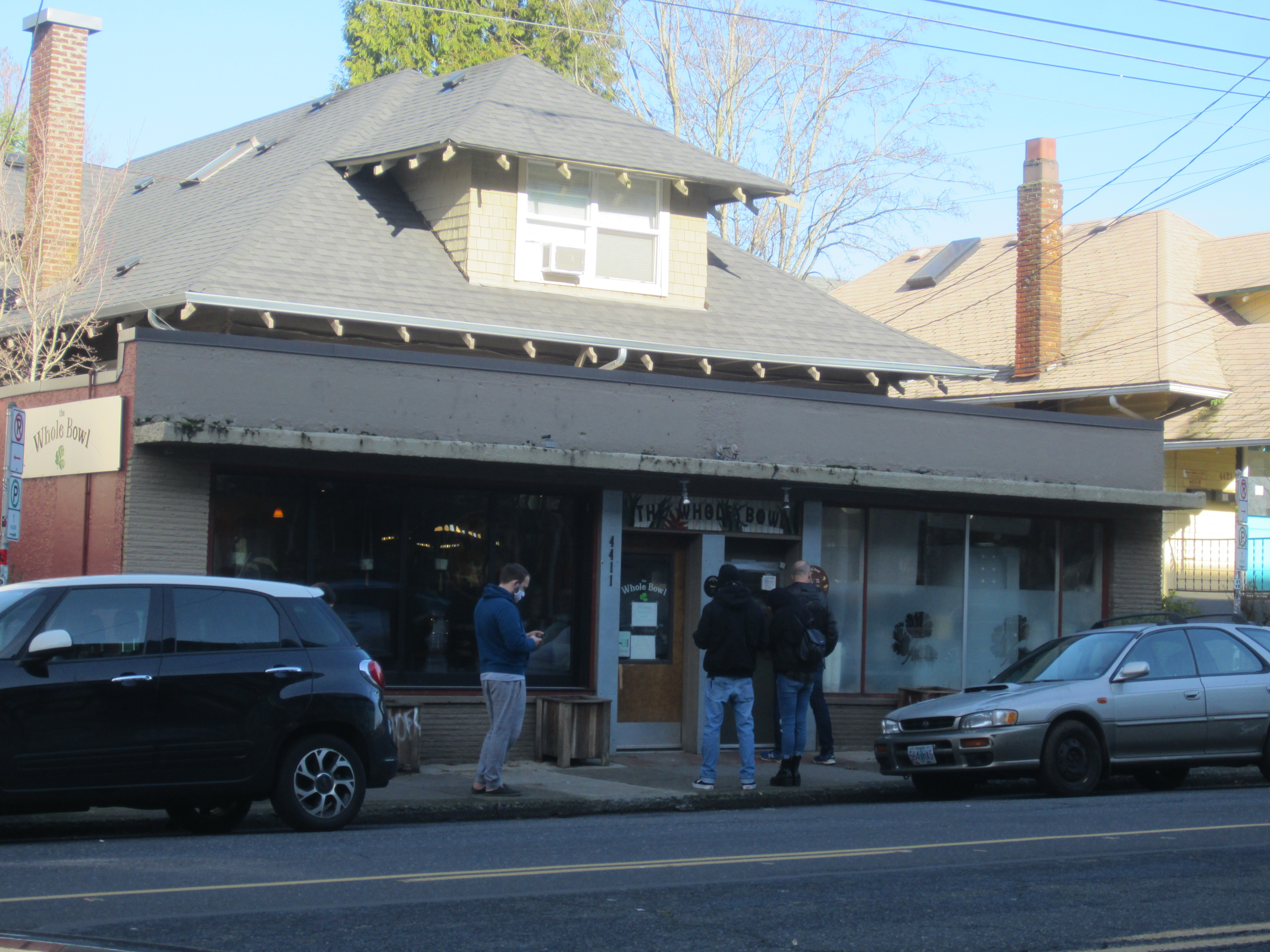
- The Whole Bowl in southeast Portland, Oregon, 2021

Restaurant information
- Established: 2001
- Owner: Moberi
- Food type: Vegetarian
- Location: United States
- Website: thewholebowl.com

The Whole Bowl is a vegetarian restaurant chain based in Portland, Oregon, United States. In addition to Oregon, the business has operated in the U.S. state of Arizona, New York, and Ohio.

== Description ==
The Whole Bowl's menu includes bowls with avocado, black olives, brown rice, black and red beans, cheddar cheese, cilantro, salsa, sour cream, and Tali sauce.

== History ==
The Whole Bowl was founded by Tali Ovadia in 2001. The business was acquired by Moberi in January 2025.

In 2013, The Whole Bowl was among the city's few food cart businesses offering health care to workers, according to Portland Business Journal.

=== Locations ===
There have been as many as 12 locations.

In Portland, there were four locations as of 2015. In 2020, the business operated in north Portland, northeast Portland's Hollywood neighborhood, and northwest Portland's Northwest District, as well as on Hawthorne Boulevard in southeast Portland. During the COVID-19 pandemic, the business delivered via Caviar and bicycle messengers. The Whole Bowl has also operated in Oregon Marketplace at the Portland International Airport.

Outside of Portland, The Whole Bowl has also operated in Cincinnati and New York City. There are plans to open a location in Lake Oswego's Mercato Grove in 2025.

== Reception ==
In 2019, Grant Butler of The Oregonian called The Whole Bowl one of Portland's "most venerable" food carts. The business won in the Best Food Cart category and ranked second in the Best Vegetarian/Vegan Restaurant category in Willamette Week's annual 'Best of Portland' readers' poll in 2020.

== See also ==
- List of companies based in Oregon
- List of restaurant chains in the United States
- List of vegetarian and vegan restaurants
