= Ryan Roadhouse =

American chef

Ryan Roadhouse is an American chef based in Portland, Oregon. He is an owner of the Japanese restaurant Nodoguro. He was won in the 'Best Chef: Northwest and Pacific' category at the James Beard Foundation Awards in 2026.

== See also ==
- List of people from Portland, Oregon
