= Angel Face (bar) =

Restaurant in Portland, Oregon, U.S.

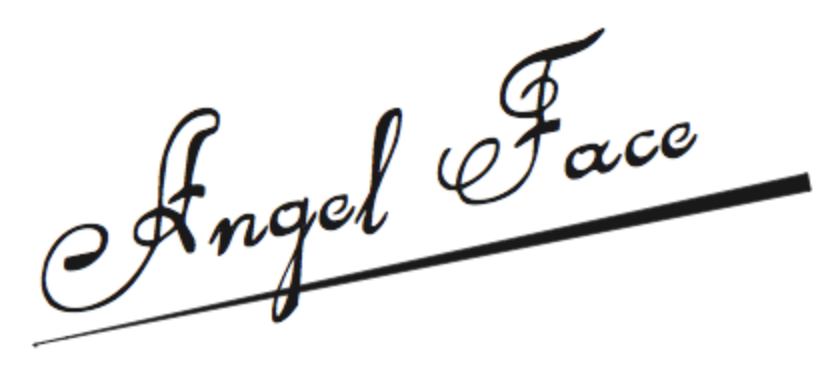

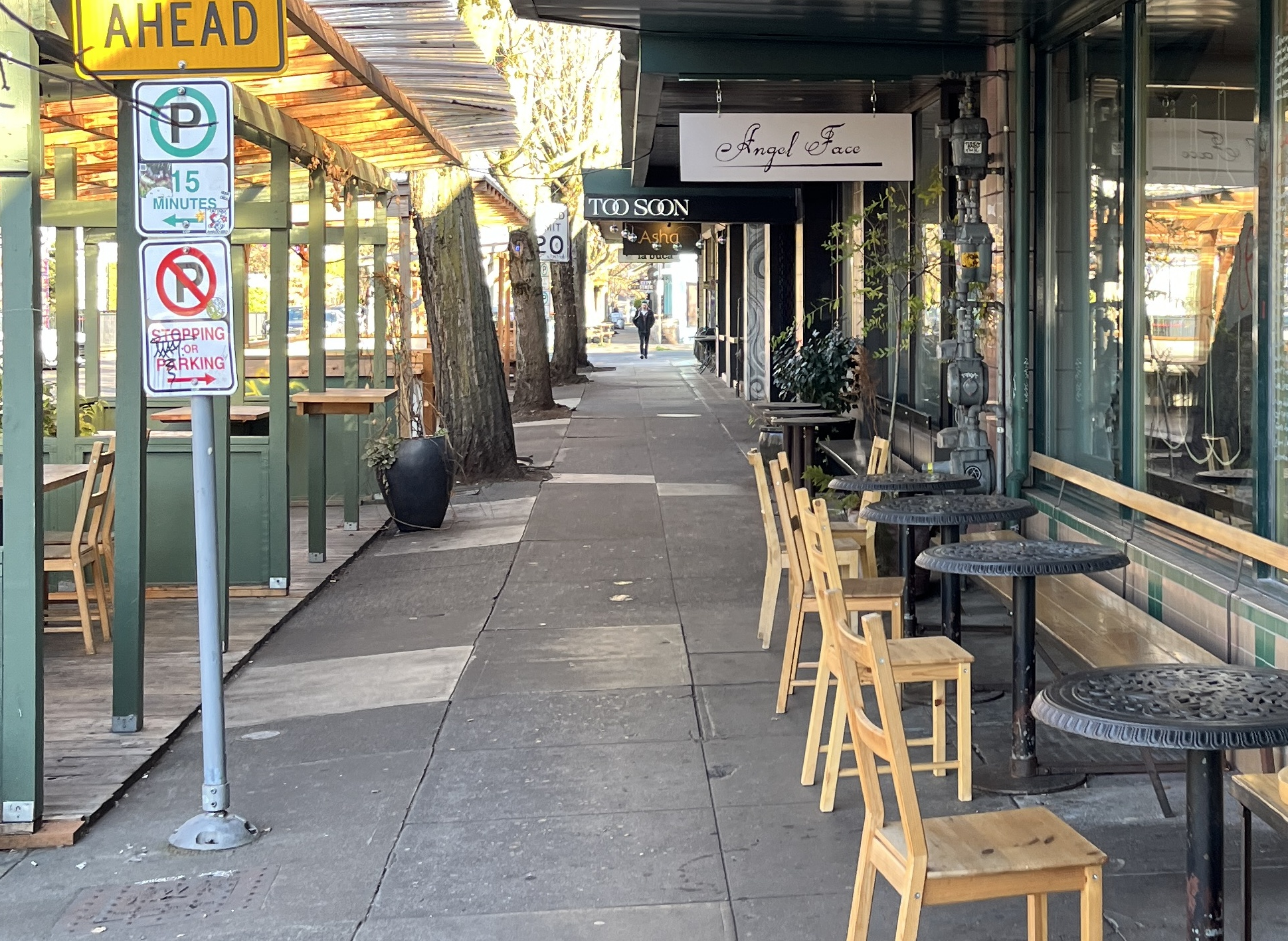
- The bar's exterior, 2025
- Interactive map of Angel Face

Restaurant information
- Established: March 2016
- Location: 14 Northeast 28th Avenue, Portland, Multnomah, Oregon, 97232, United States
- Coordinates: 45.5232°N 122.6371°W
- Website: angelfaceportland.com

Angel Face is a bar in Portland, Oregon, United States. It opened in March 2016.

== Description ==
The bar Angel Face operates on 28th Avenue, near the intersection with East Burnside Street, in the northeast Portland part of the Kerns neighborhood. Eater Portland has described Angels Face as "a pretty little European bar with handpainted flowers on the walls, oysters on the half shell, and famously, cocktails ordered on a case by case basis, sans list". Alexander Frane of Condé Nast Traveler wrote, "With a horseshoe-shaped marble bar and faded pink wallpaper, this cocktail den feels like something out of an Impressionist painting."

Portland Monthly has called Angel Face a "Paris-meets-Portland cocktail bar jewel". Angel Face has a covered and heated patio. Michael Russell of The Oregonian described the clientele as "artists, musicians, boutique owners, chefs and a writer grabbing a drink before a second-run movie at Laurelhurst Theater". The menu has included a pickle plate, Castelvetrano olives, lamb stew, steak frites. The bar has also served food from neighboring restaurant Navarre.

== History ==
Angel Face opened in March 2016.

== Reception ==
Michael Russell included Angel Face in The Oregonian's 2014 list of Portland's ten best new bars. Alexander Frane included the business in Condé Nast Traveler's 2018 list of Portland's thirteen best bars. Karen Brooks, Katherine Chew Hamilton, and Matthew Trueherz included the bar in Portland Monthly's 2023 overview of the city's "most romantic, date-worthy" restaurants.
