= Roe (restaurant) =

Defunct restaurant in Portland, Oregon, U.S.

- Interactive map of Roe

Restaurant information
- Established: 2012
- Closed: 2020
- Head chef: Trent Pierce; John Conlin
- Food type: Seafood
- Location: 515 SW Broadway #100, Portland, Multnomah, Oregon, 97205, United States
- Coordinates: 45°31′14″N 122°40′45″W

Roe was a restaurant in Portland, Oregon. It opened in southeast Portland's Richmond neighborhood in 2012, before relocating to southwest Portland's Morgan Building in 2017. Roe closed in 2020, during the COVID-19 pandemic.

== Description ==
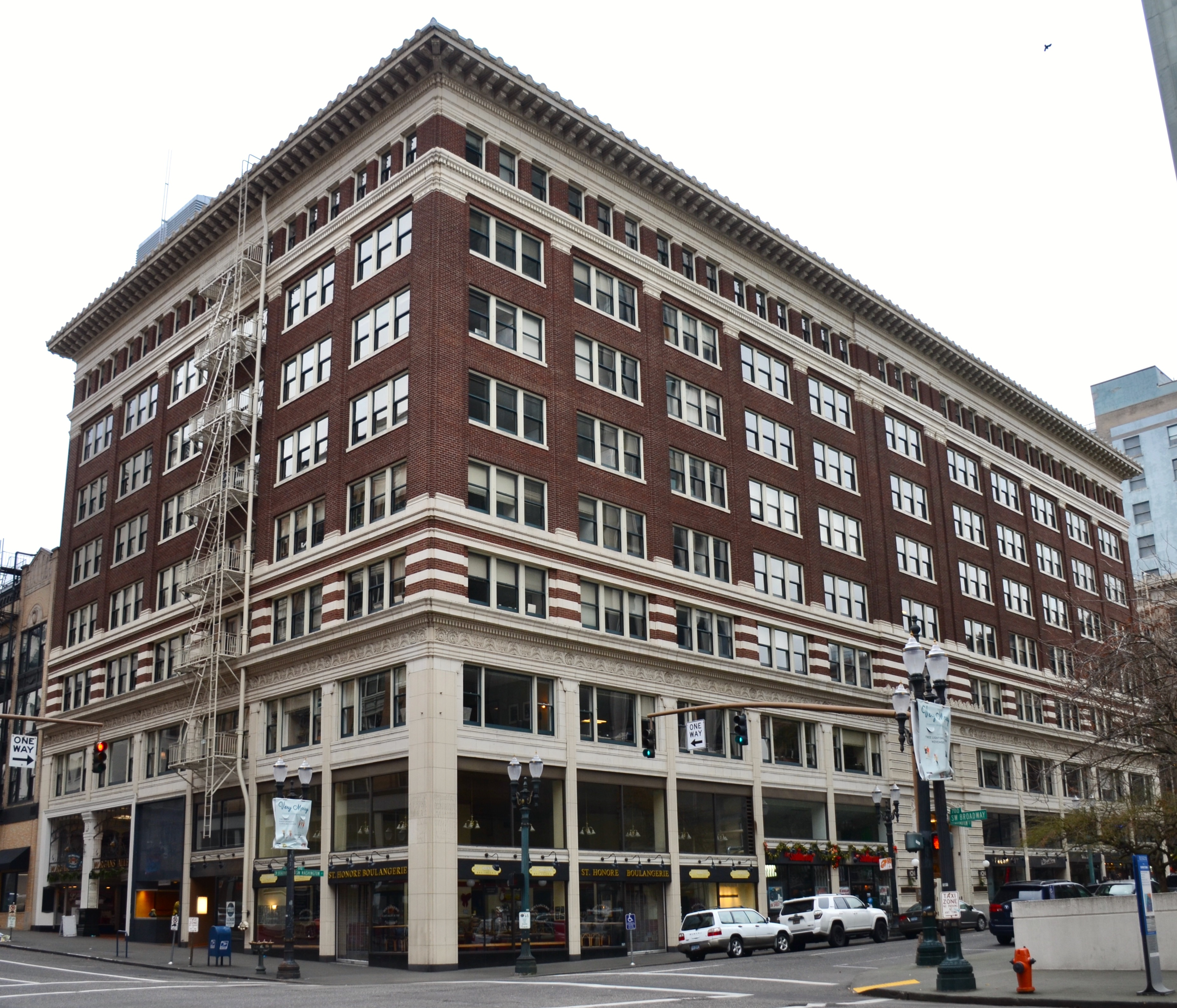
Roe operated in southwest Portland's Morgan Building (pictured in 2018) from 2017 to 2020.

The fine dining seafood restaurant Roe operated in southeast Portland's Richmond neighborhood before relocating to southwest Portland's Morgan Building. The original location had a seating capacity of approximately 30 people.

Roe served caviar, poached lobster with grapefruit custard, and tobiko over foie gras. The menu also included: uni with roasted foie gras, tarragon plum sauce, and brioche; grilled octopus with black tagliatelli; and kampachi tartare with avacado roulade and vodka crème fraiche. Reservations were required.

== History ==
Roe opened on Division Street in southeast Portland in 2012. Trent Pierce was a chef. The business relocated to the Morgan Building in 2017, operating in the space previously occupied by Hunan Restaurant.

Pierce resigned as head chef in 2018. He was replaced by chef de cuisine John Conlin.

The restaurant closed in 2020, during the COVID-19 pandemic. Following a rebrand, Tercet began operating in 2021.

== See also ==
- COVID-19 pandemic in Portland, Oregon
- Impact of the COVID-19 pandemic on the restaurant industry in the United States
- List of defunct restaurants of the United States
- List of seafood restaurants
