= Cathy Whims =

American chef and restaurateur

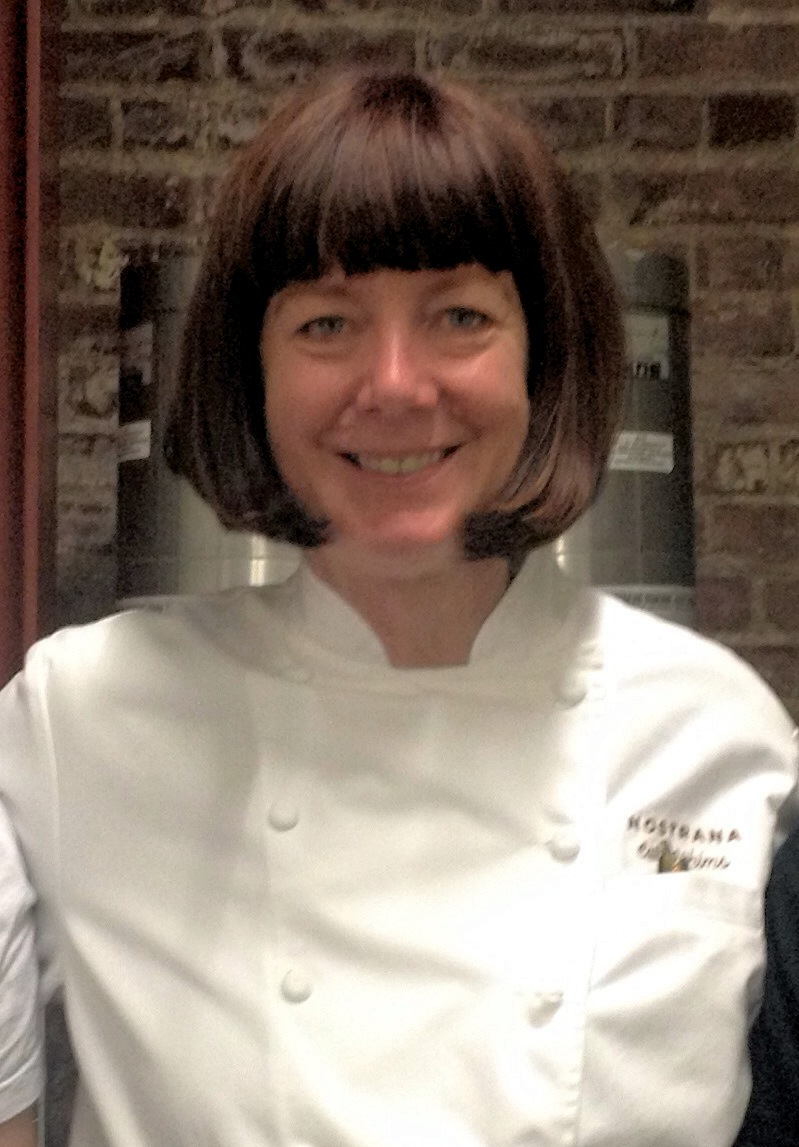
- Born: 1956 (age 69–70)
- Occupations: Chef; restaurateur
- Years active: 1970s–present

Cathy Whims (born 1956) is an American chef and restaurateur in Portland, Oregon. She has been a James Beard Foundation Award finalist six times. The restaurants she has owned in Portland include Genoa, Nostrana, and the pizzeria Oven and Shaker.

== Early life ==
Cathy Whims, the daughter of Harold Carter Whims Jr. and Ann Virginia Thomas (née Thomas) Whims, was born in 1956 and raised in Chapel Hill, North Carolina.

== Career ==
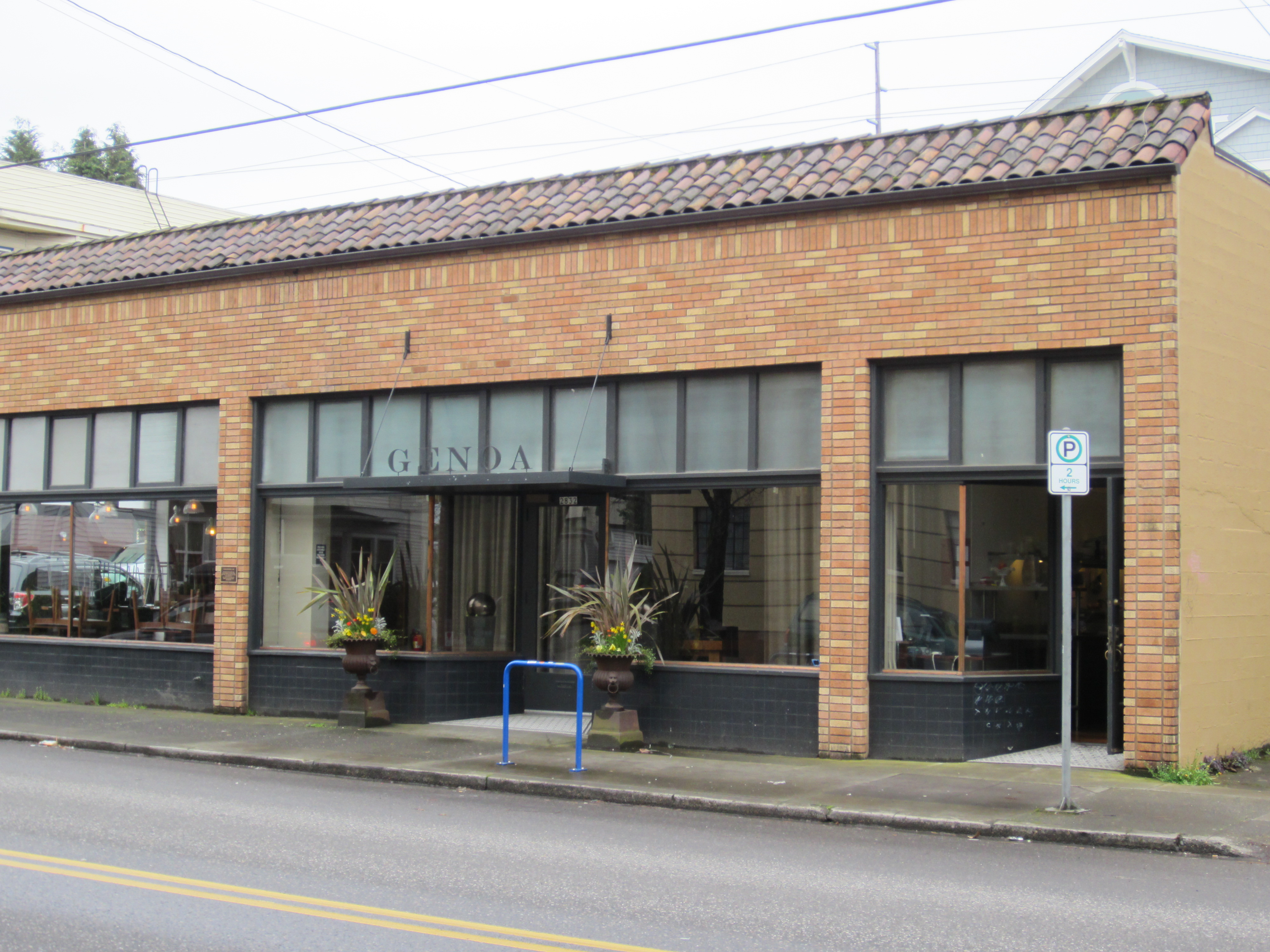
Whims became a chef and co-owner during her eighteen-year tenure at the defunct Italian restaurant Genoa (front exterior pictured in 2012).

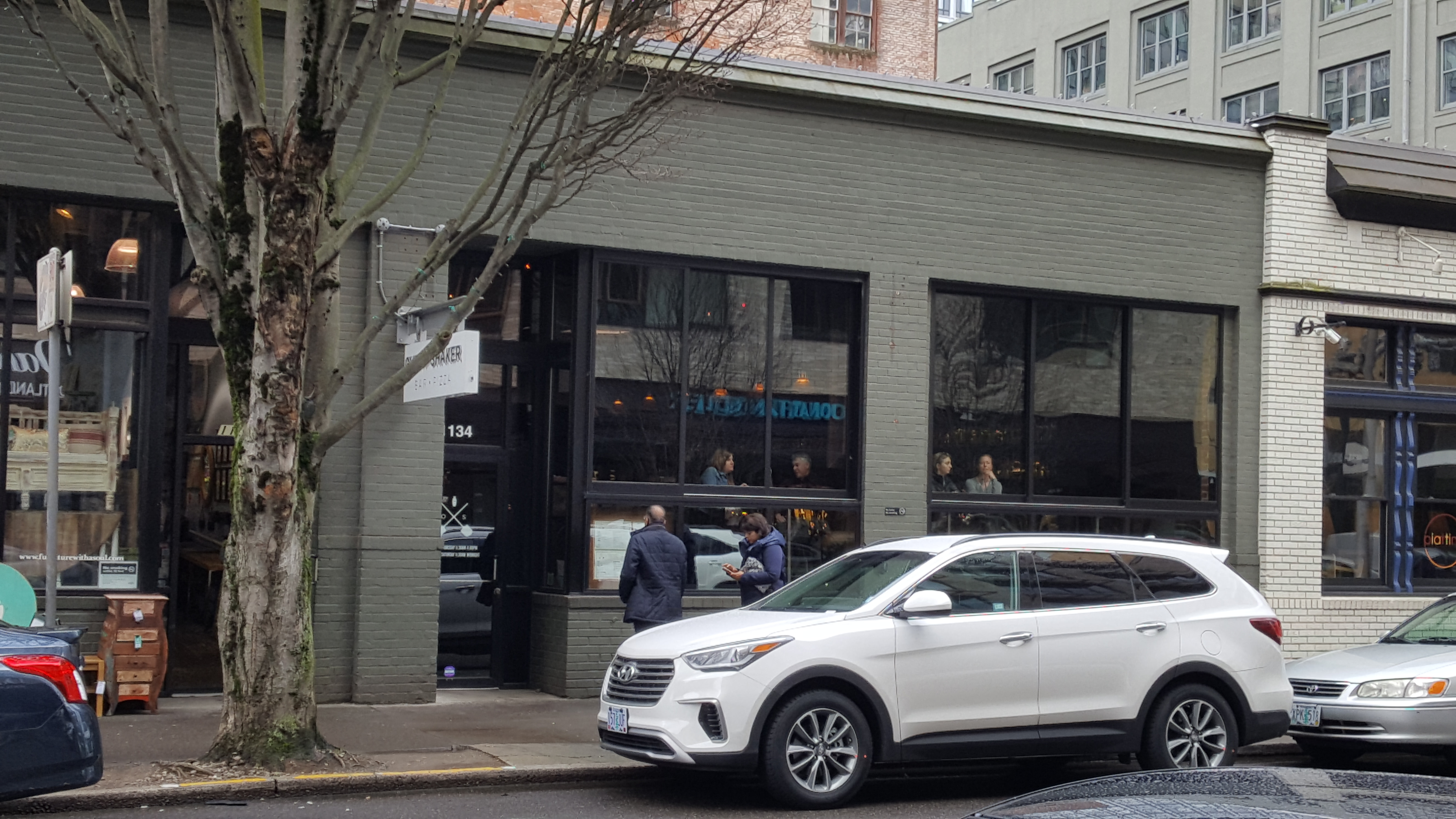
Exterior of Oven and Shaker, 2017

Whims' mother was "from the Julia Child–era school" of cooking, and Whims has said she "started cooking because it was my passion". Whims has been influenced by Italian-born cooking writer Marcella Hazan and French chef and restaurateur Madeleine Kamman. Whims studied with Hazan in Venice in 1998, and later worked in restaurants in Italy's Langhe region.

Early in her career, Whims was the bread-and-pastry chef in a local natural-food restaurant; she catered private dinners in Chapel Hill and later worked at kitchens in the San Francisco Bay Area. She relocated to Portland in 1979 and immediately began working at Produce Row Café. Whims served as a prep cook at the Italian restaurant Genoa, and she later became executive chef. After eighteen years at the restaurant, she became a co-owner of the business, which was credited "for bringing fine-dining to Portland", before it closed in 2014.

Whims opened several restaurants in Portland, including Nostrana (2005–present), Hamlet (2015–2017), and the pizzeria/bar Oven and Shaker (2011–present). Nostrana serves classic Italian cuisine and has been described as "Portland's capital of the Negroni". In 2015, Portland Monthly named Hamlet one of Portland's best restaurants. Oven and Shaker specializes in Neapolitan pizza and was named a "best new pizza place" by Food & Wine.

In 2017, Whims served as Oregon's ambassador for the James Beard Foundation's Smart Catch program, which promotes sustainable seafood practices. She opened the 40-seat European wine bar Enoteca Nostrana, adjacent to Nostrana, in 2018.

=== Recognition ===
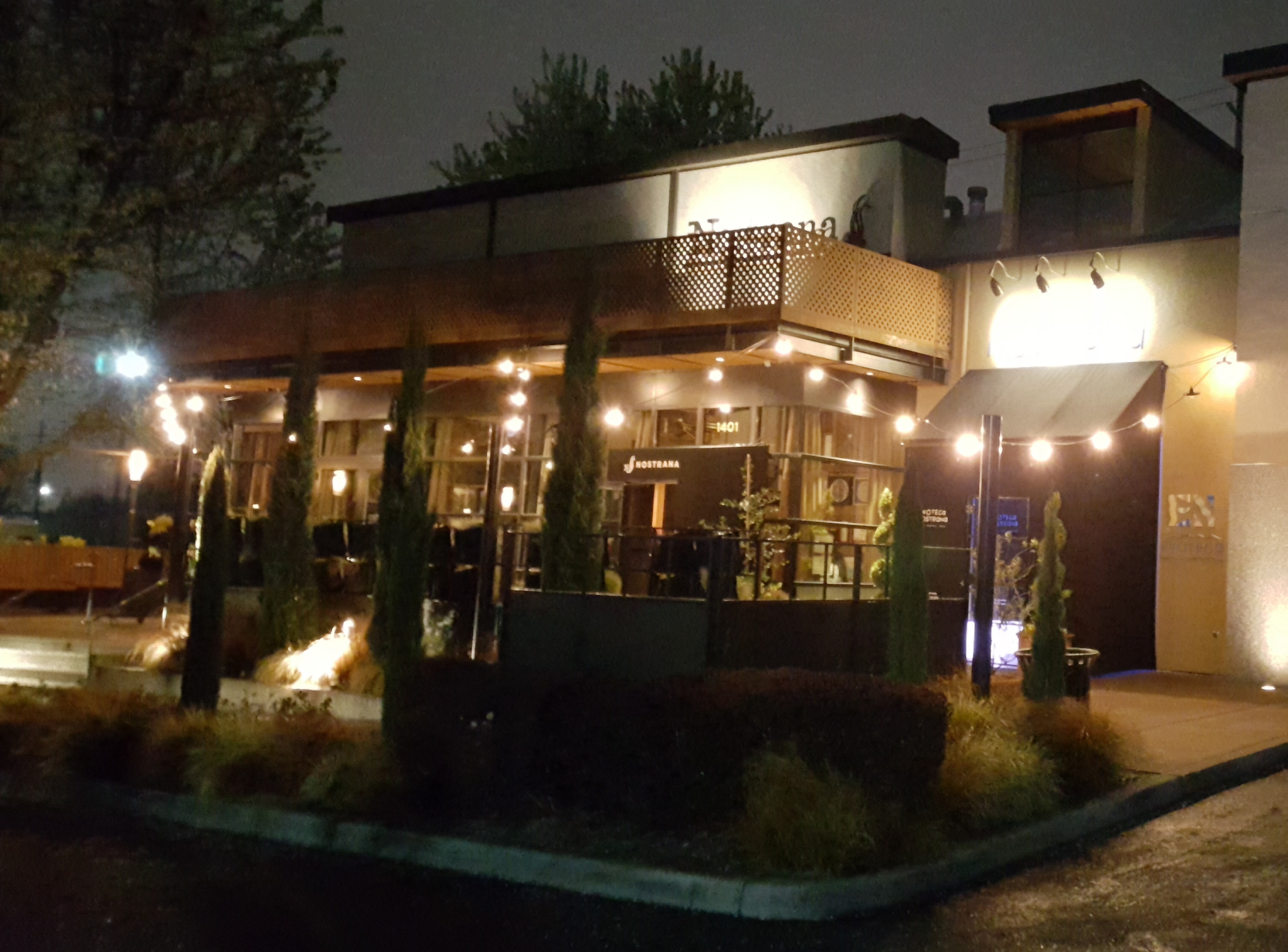
Exterior of Nostrana, 2019

After opening Nostrana, Cathy Whims received six consecutive James Beard Foundation Award nominations for Best Chef: Northwest, each year from 2008 to 2013. She was also nominated for a 2016 James Beard Foundation Journalism Award in the "Home Cooking" category for a story called "Into the Woods", which she co-wrote with Langdon Cook and was published in EatingWell magazine.

Whims won the first "Wild About Game Cook-Off", which was held in Welches, a town about 40 miles (64 km) southeast of Portland, with her "Qualgie Con Fiche", a dish consisting of a brace of semi-boneless quail pan-roasted with a fig jam sauce; the dish was accompanied by braised greens, polenta, and a glass of Three Rivers 1999 Syrah.

Portland Monthly's Benjamin Tepler has described Whims as "the unofficial doyenne of Italian cooking" for the Pacific Northwest. Katie Chang of Food Republic wrote; "Whims also helped train and usher in a new generation of talented chefs and restaurateurs ... whom many credit with cementing Portland's status as a world-class dining destination". Her recipes have been published in cookbooks and a variety of other publications such as Epicurious, The Seattle Times, and The Wall Street Journal.

== Personal life ==
Whims is married and lives in Portland, Oregon. Her partner David West co-owns Nostrana and Enoteca Nostrana. She has described herself as a "born-again Italian". Whims has a sister who also works in the restaurant industry.

Following her mentor Hazan's death in 2013, Whims commemorated her by creating a special tribute menu at Nostrana. Nostrana's menu has featured recipes that were inspired by Hazan, as well as dessert recipes Whims learned from American chef, baker, and writer Nancy Silverton.

== See also ==
- List of American restaurateurs
- List of people from Portland, Oregon
