= Morgan Building =

Historic building in Portland, Oregon, U.S.

- U.S. National Register of Historic Places
- Portland Historic Landmark
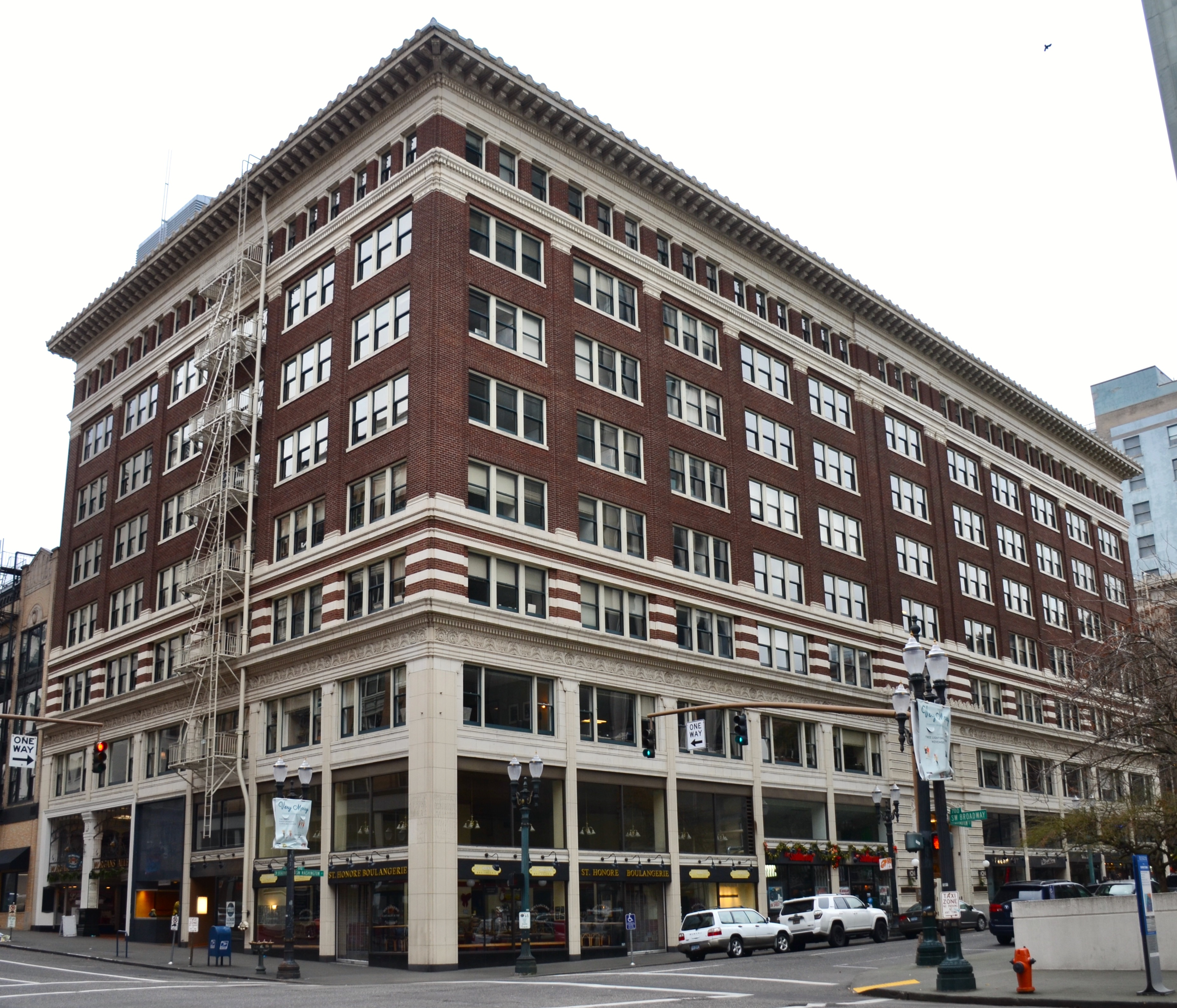
- Viewed from the northeast in 2018

- Location within Portland, Oregon Location within Oregon Location within the United States
- Location: 720 SW Washington Street; Portland, Oregon
- Coordinates: 45°31′14″N 122°40′46″W
- Area: 0.5 acres (0.20 ha)
- Built: 1913
- Architect: Doyle, Patterson & Beach
- Architectural style: Beaux Arts
- NRHP reference No.: 96001003
- Added to NRHP: September 12, 1996

The Morgan Building is an office building located in downtown Portland, Oregon, listed on the National Register of Historic Places.

The Morgan was home to Theodore Kruse's Rainbow Grill, which opened in October 1913. Kruse had closed his Louvre restaurant, a hotspot in the gay community, after it was a focal point of the 1912 Portland vice scandal. The Rainbow advertised "fat, juicy, delicious" oysters and a "Special Men's Grill" with meat of the diner's choosing. It closed in June 1915. The building was purchased for $27.5 million in 2008, and then next sold in 2025 for $6 million.

Hunan Restaurant, Nodoguro, Roe, and Tercet have operated in the building.

== See also ==
- National Register of Historic Places listings in Southwest Portland, Oregon
