= Genoa Building =

Historic building in Portland, Oregon, U.S.

- U.S. National Register of Historic Places
- Portland Historic Landmark
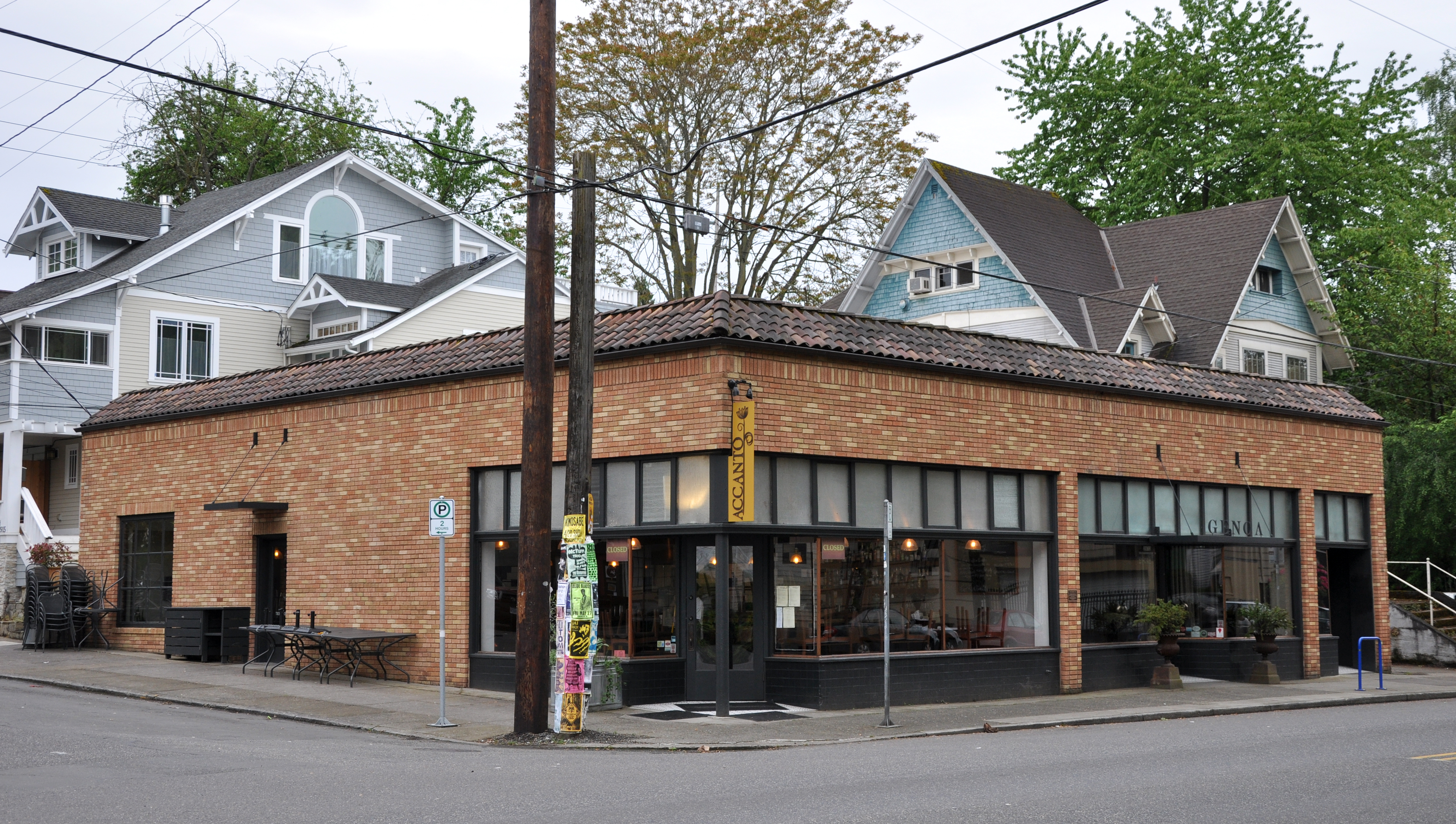
- Genoa Building in 2011

- Location within Portland, Oregon Location within Oregon Location within the United States
- Location: 2832 SE Belmont Street; Portland, Oregon
- Coordinates: 45°30′59″N 122°38′11″W
- Area: 60 feet (18 m) square
- Built: 1930
- Architectural style: Vernacular, Mediterranean, commercial
- NRHP reference No.: 97000580
- Added to NRHP: June 13, 1997

The Genoa Building, at the intersection of Southeast Belmont Street and Southeast 29th Avenue in Portland in the U.S. state of Oregon, is a single-story commercial building listed on the National Register of Historic Places. Built in a Vernacular style with Mediterranean features in 1930, it was added to the register in 1997.

After construction of the Morrison Bridge over the Willamette River in the late 19th century, Belmont Street became an important arterial with a streetcar line extending from central downtown Portland to as far east as Southeast 34th Avenue. A business district that centered on the original streetcar terminus gradually spread up and down Belmont. Among the last of the buildings in this development was the Genoa Building.

Home to three separate storefronts facing Belmont Street, the Genoa is a square building 60 feet (18 m) on each side. Although all are 60 feet (18 m) deep, two of the storefronts are 25 feet (7.6 m) wide, and the third, on the west, is only 10 feet (3.0 m) wide. Early tenants included a pharmacist, a barber, and a grocer. Significant architectural features include display windows across the north side and part of the east side of the building, 12-foot (3.7 m) interior ceiling heights, a partial basement in the rear, and a red clay tile roof.

J.W. Wilson was the original owner of the building, constructed by Knott and Rogers. Winifred Guild acquired the property in 1943, and the Guild family retained control of it until 1971, after which it was converted to restaurant space. The building later housed the Japanese restaurant Nodoguro.

== See also ==
- Genoa (restaurant)
- National Register of Historic Places listings in Southeast Portland, Oregon
