= Lardo (restaurant) =

Chain of sandwich restaurants in Portland, Oregon, U.S.

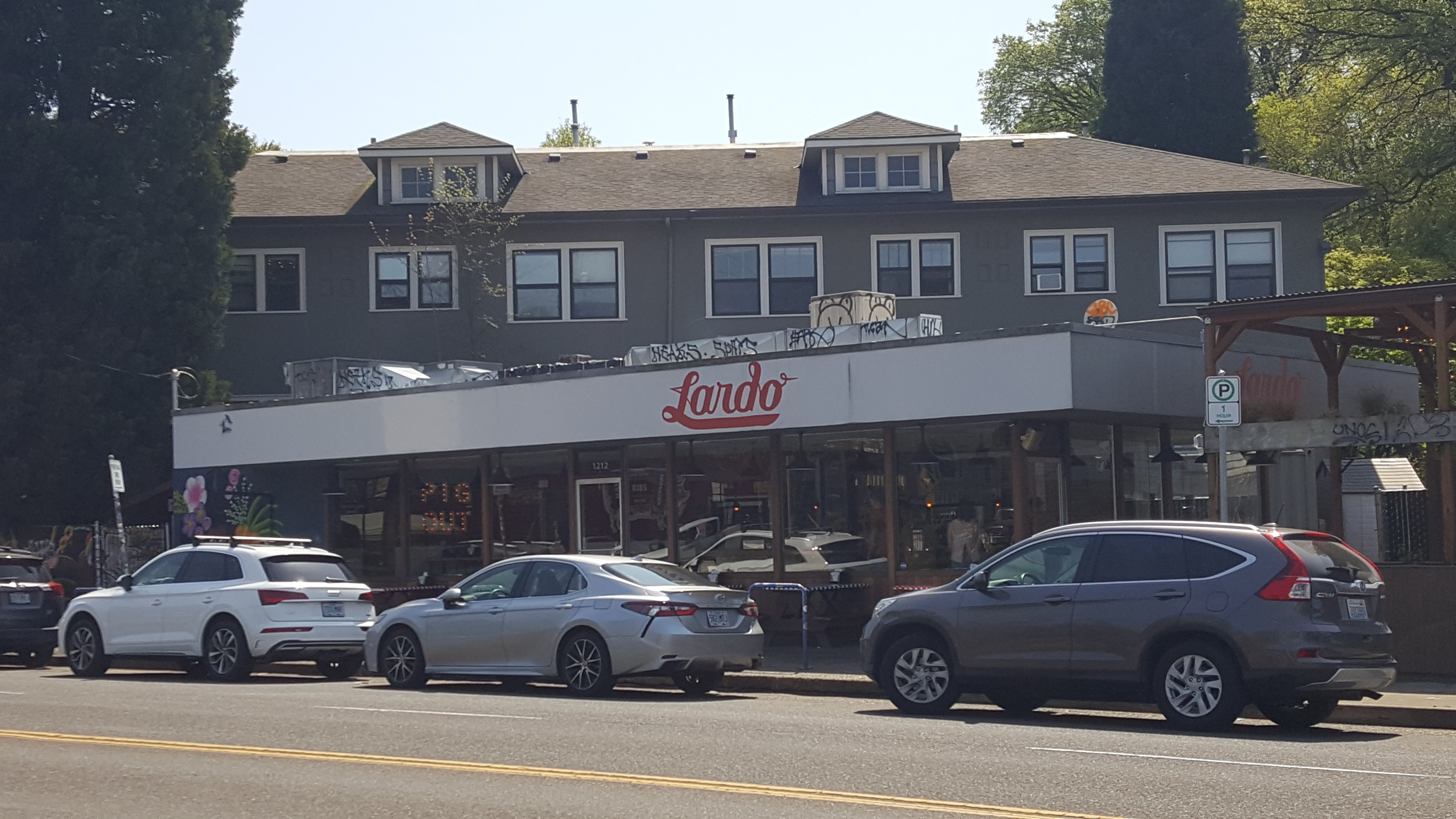
- Exterior of the restaurant in southeast Portland, Oregon, 2022
- Interactive map of Lardo

Restaurant information
- Location: Portland, Oregon, United States
- Coordinates: 45.5121°N 122.6530°W
- Website: lardosandwiches.com

Lardo is a small chain of sandwich restaurants, based in Portland, Oregon. As of 2024, the company operates in Portland on Southeast Hawthorne Boulevard, at the Moda Center, and at the Portland International Airport. Additionally, Lardo operates in Las Vegas and previously operated in Lake Oswego.

== History and locations ==
The first two restaurants opened in Southeast Portland's Hosford-Abernethy neighborhood and in downtown's West End. A third restaurant, sometimes referred to a Lardo North, opened along North Williams Avenue in 2014. The North Portland location closed in 2016, and the West End location closed in 2024. Lardo also operates at the Portland International Airport. The business became a vendor at Moda Center in 2023.

The Lardo at Mercato Grove in Lake Oswego closed on January 6, 2025.

The restaurant participated in Portland's Dumpling Week in 2026.

== Reception ==
Lardo won in the Best Sandwich Shop category of Willamette Week's annual 'Best of Portland' readers' poll in 2016, 2017, 2018, and 2022. Writers for Portland Monthly included the Korean pork shoulder in a 2025 list of the city's "most iconic" dishes.

== See also ==
- List of restaurant chains in the United States
