= Grassa (restaurant) =

Restaurant chain in the Portland, Oregon metropolitan area, U.S.

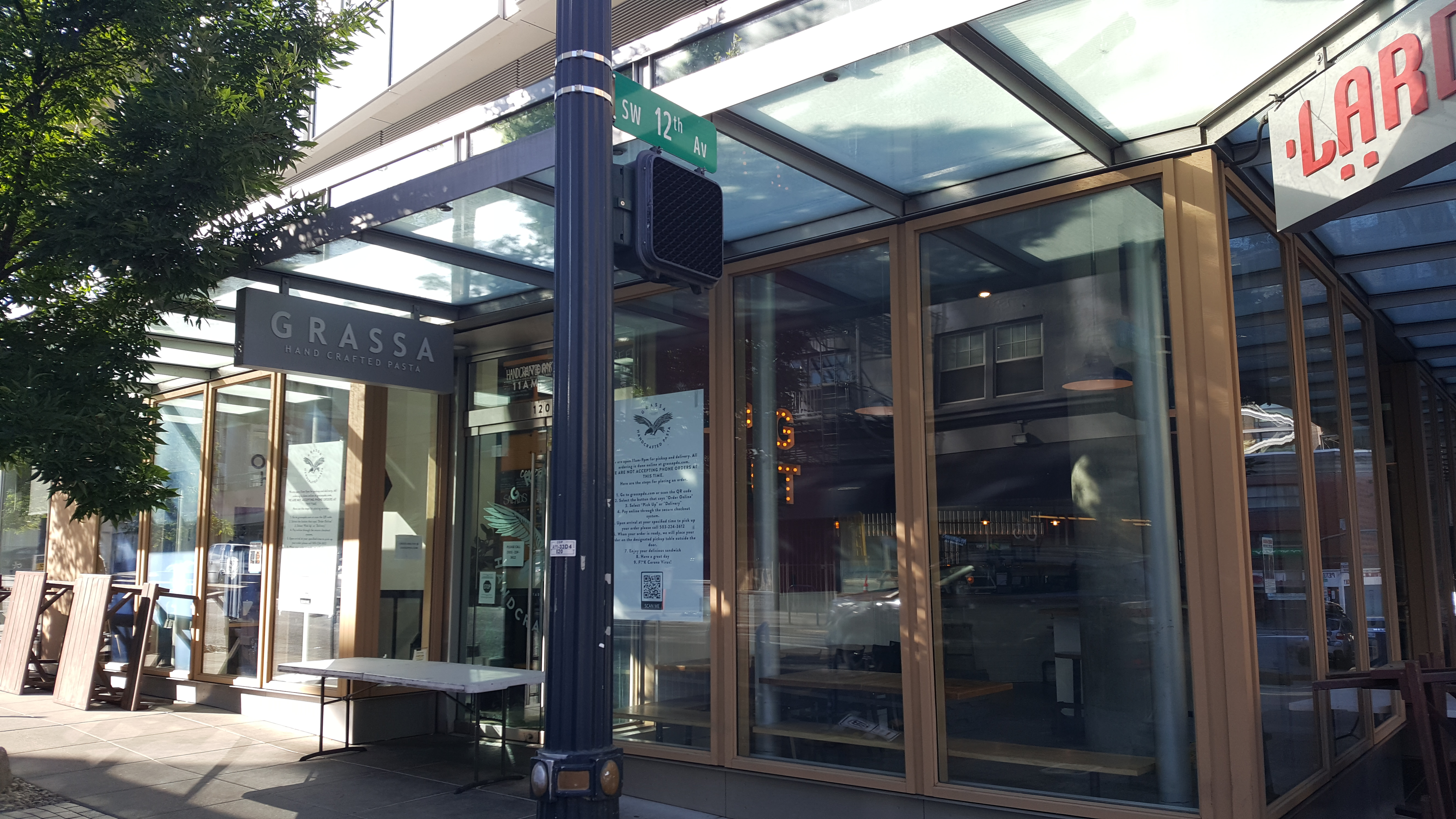
- The Southwest Portland restaurant's exterior in 2020
- Interactive map of Grassa

Restaurant information
- Established: 2013; 13 years ago
- Owner: Rick Gencarelli
- Food type: Italian
- Location: 1205 Southwest Washington Street; 1506 Northwest 23rd Avenue; 1375 Southeast Hawthorne Boulevard, Portland, Oregon, United States
- Coordinates: 45°31′19.6″N 122°41′01.3″W
- Website: grassapdx.com

Grassa is a restaurant with multiple locations in the Portland, Oregon metropolitan area, in the United States. The original restaurant opened in Southwest Portland in 2013; subsequent locations have opened in Northwest Portland's Northwest District, in Southeast Portland's Buckman neighborhood, and in Vancouver, Washington.

== Description and history ==
Grassa was established by chef Rick Gencarelli. Eater Portland's Brooke Jackson-Glidden has described Grassa as "a casual, kid-friendly pasta shop with turntables playing old records and bowls of noodles named for [Gencarelli's] kids". The original Grassa (sometimes called "West End Grassa") opened in Southwest Portland's West End neighborhood in 2013.

A second location, nicknamed "Grassa Vol. 2", opened in Northwest Portland's Northwest District in 2016. Grassa's third location opened near the intersection of Hawthorne and 15th Avenue in Southeast Portland's Buckman neighborhood around December 31, 2019.

Another location opened along Vancouver Waterfront Park, in Vancouver, Washington. The business also operates at the Portland International Airport. Gencarelli has also planned to open Grassa restaurants in Lake Oswego, Oregon, as well as Japan.

The restaurant participated in Portland's Dumpling Week in 2026. A seventh location is slated to open at Cedar Hills Crossing in Beaverton in 2026.

== Reception ==
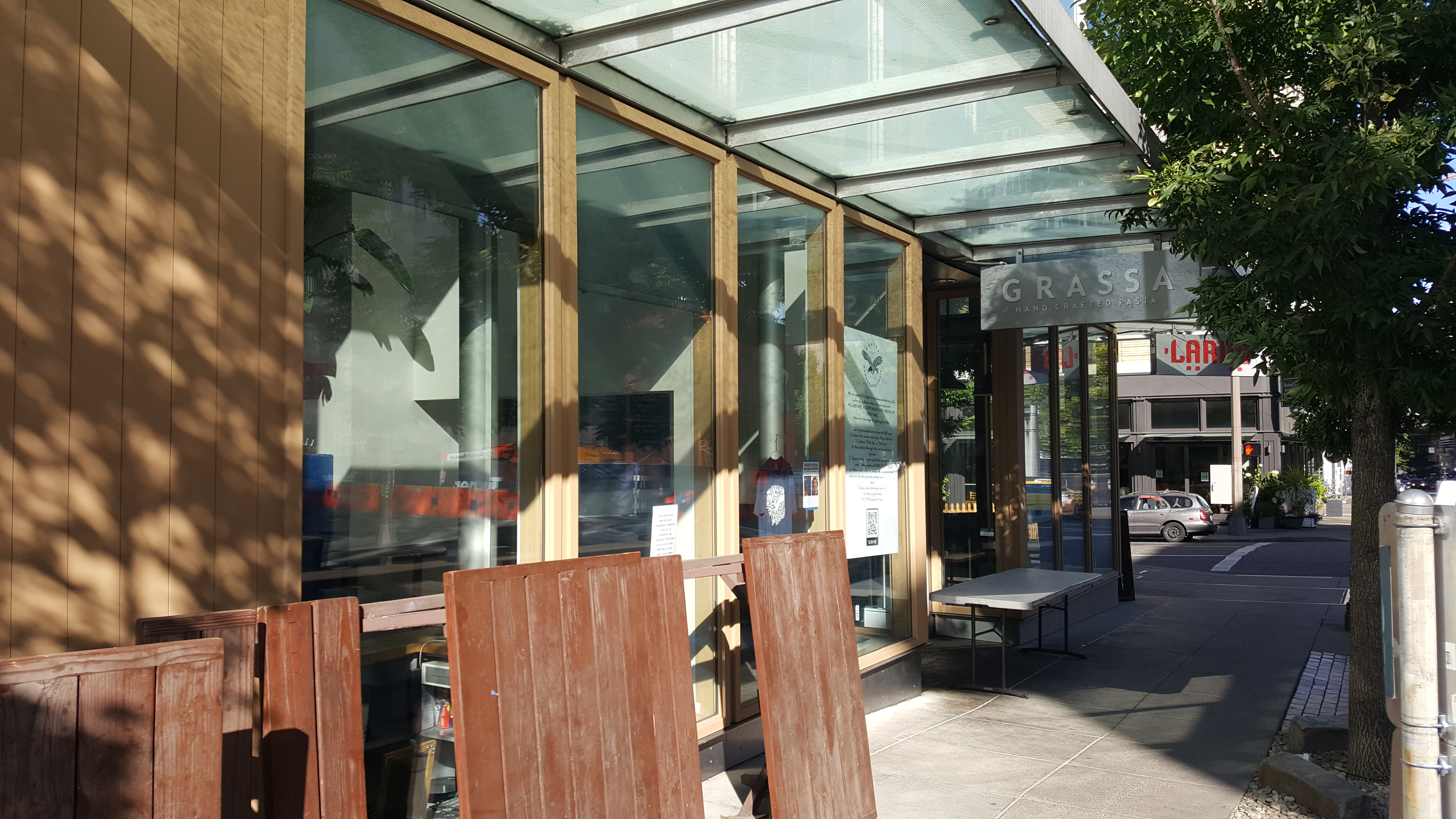
Exterior of the Southwest Portland restaurant in 2020, during the COVID-19 pandemic

Chris Onstad of the Portland Mercury wrote, "The offerings at Grassa are robust, and often intense. This isn't a feather on a fulcrum, it's a barbell, and it's remarkably balanced. For that, as well as for price and quality, it's highly recommended for a casual meal." In her review for the Portland Tribune, Anne Marie DiStefano said, "Grassa is a good ambassador, a place where someone with average pasta expectations can be pleasantly surprised by the high quality of everyday, affordable food in Portland."

In his 2016 review of the Washington Street location, Willamette Week's Matthew Korfhage wrote, "Like an old punk rocker who now works in marketing, craft-pasta spot Grassa has aged surprisingly gracefully. The restaurant's rough edges—unpredictable tunes at unpredictable volume, dining-room staff with occasional kitchen manners—have become idiosyncratic elements in a machine that's now quite well-oiled." Eater Portland contributors have included Grassa in lists of "15 Primo Italian Restaurants in Portland" (2018) and "16 Quintessential Restaurants and Bars in Slabtown" (2019).

== See also ==
- List of Italian restaurants
- List of casual dining restaurant chains
- List of restaurant chains in the United States
