= Hunan Restaurant =

Defunct Chinese restaurant in Portland, Oregon, US

- Interactive map of Hunan Restaurant

Restaurant information
- Established: 1979
- Closed: 2014
- Food type: Chinese
- Location: Portland, Oregon, United States
- Coordinates: 45.5205°N 122.6793°W

Hunan Restaurant was a Chinese restaurant in Portland, Oregon, United States.

== History ==
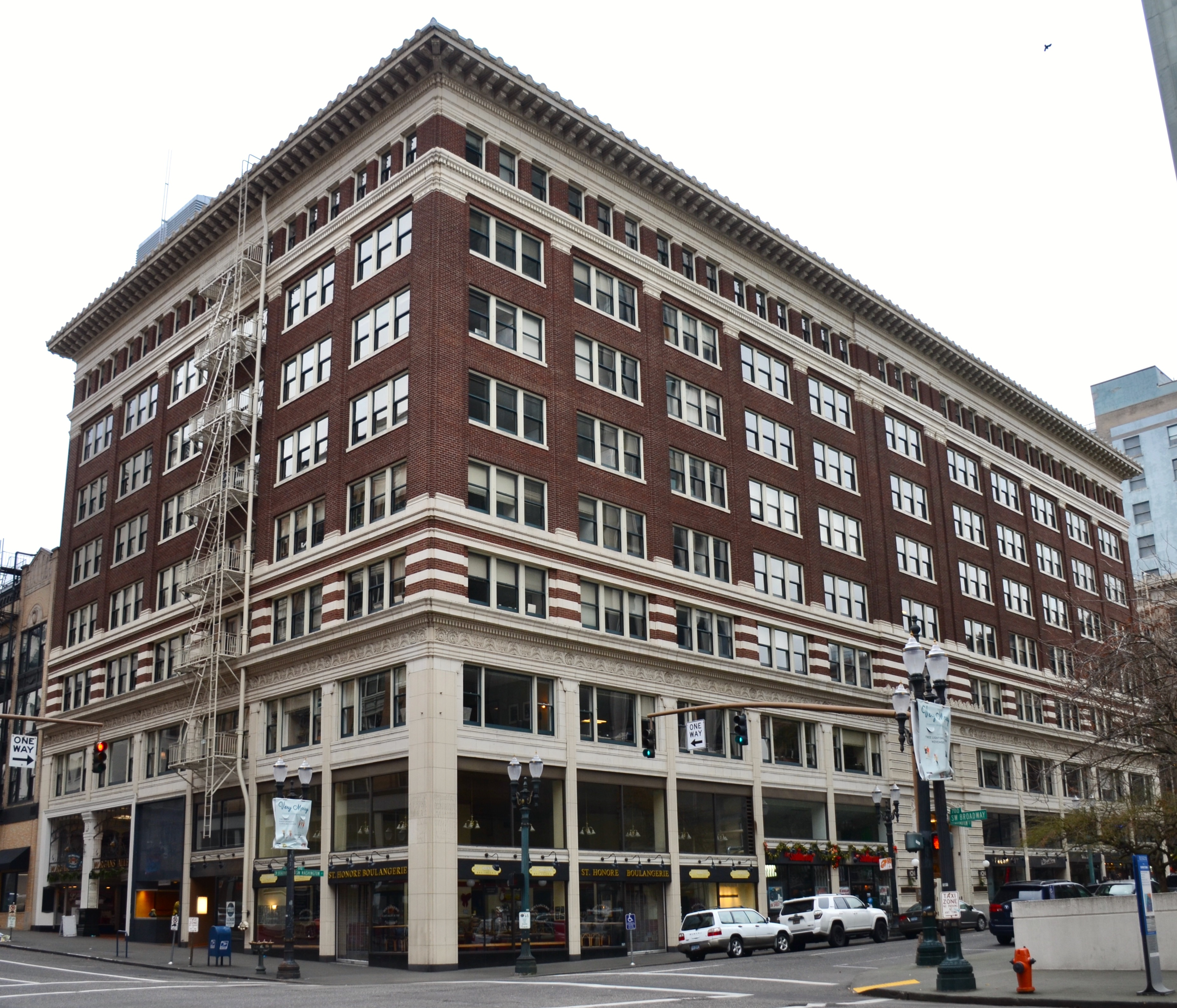
The restaurant operated in the Morgan Building

The Liu family opened Hunan Restaurant in Morgan's Alley in downtown Portland in 1979. The restaurant closed in 2014.

== Reception ==
Grant Butler included Hunan Restaurant in The Oregonian's 2016 list of "Tasty memories: 97 long-gone Portland restaurants we wish were still around", writing: "For 35 years, this Chinese restaurant in downtown's Morgan's Alley was the place for hot-and-spicy fare served with flare, like the Dragon and the Phoenix, a dish combining crab and chicken, served with delicate flowers sculpted from apples and cucumbers. It was one of the first Portland restaurants to serve the now-ubiquitous General Tso's chicken, and there were specialties not seen elsewhere at the time, like tea-smoked duck served in tiny pancakes with plum sauce."

== See also ==
- List of Chinese restaurants
