= Nostrana (restaurant) =

Italian restaurant in Portland, Oregon, U.S.

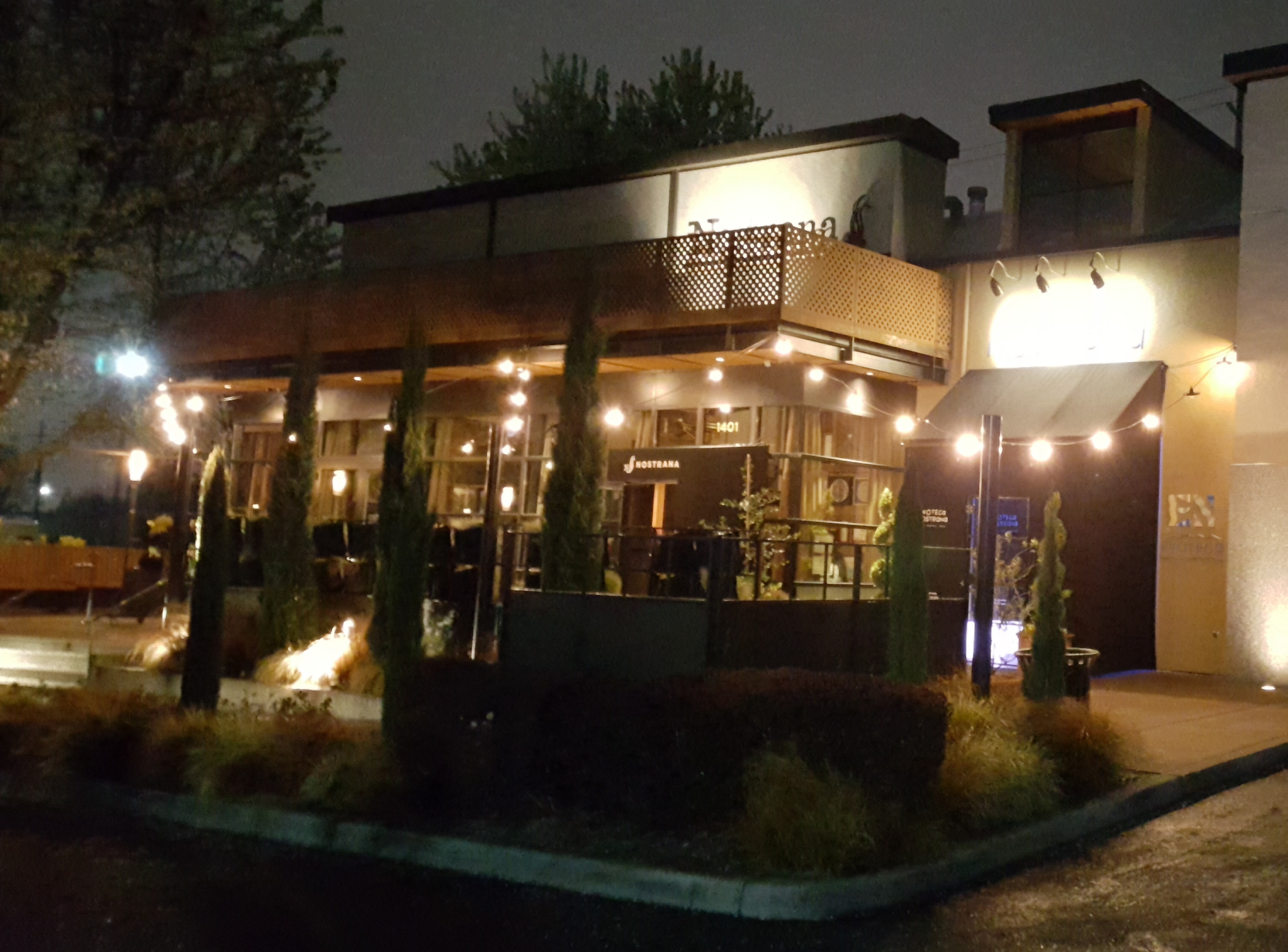
- The restaurant's exterior, 2019
- Interactive map of Nostrana

Restaurant information
- Established: 2005; 21 years ago
- Owners: Cathy Whims; David West
- Head chef: Cathy Whims (chef/owner); Brian Murphy (executive chef)
- Food type: Italian cuisine
- Location: 1401 Southeast Morrison Street, Suite 101, Portland, Oregon, Multnomah, Oregon, 97214, United States
- Coordinates: 45.51734°N 122.65144°W
- Website: nostrana.com

Nostrana is an Italian restaurant and pizzeria in southeast Portland, Oregon, United States. Cathy Whims opened the restaurant in 2005 and serves as chef and owner. Nostrana serves classic Italian cuisine and has been dubbed "Portland's capital of the Negroni". The restaurant has received a generally positive reception, especially for its pizzas and happy hour menu. In 2018, Whims opened the European wine bar Enoteca Nostrana next door to the restaurant.

== Description and history ==
Chef and owner Cathy Whims opened Nostrana in Portland's Buckman neighborhood in 2005, along with her partner David West as well as Mark and Deb Accuardi. Whims and West purchased the Accuardis' portion of the business in 2008 after differences of opinion over levels of service. Brian Murphy serves as executive chef.

The menu features classic Italian cuisine such as pasta, pizzas, and salads. Entrées are seasonal, but Bistecca alla Fiorentina and fettuccine with tomato butter sauce inspired by Marcella Hazan (one of Whims' former teachers) are regular options. According to Thrillist, which dubbed the restaurant "Portland's capital of the Negroni", Nostrana started the costumed gala Negroni Social, which inspired Negroni Week.

The restaurant's interior features vaulted ceilings and an iron chandelier. According to Eater Portland, the restaurant's atmosphere "straddles that line between 'casual-ish' and upscale". As of 2016, a sommelier is on the floor nightly.

In 2017, the restaurant was featured on the "Italian Favorites" episode of Iron Chef Eats, a companion series to the Food Network's Iron Chef Gauntlet.

== Reception ==
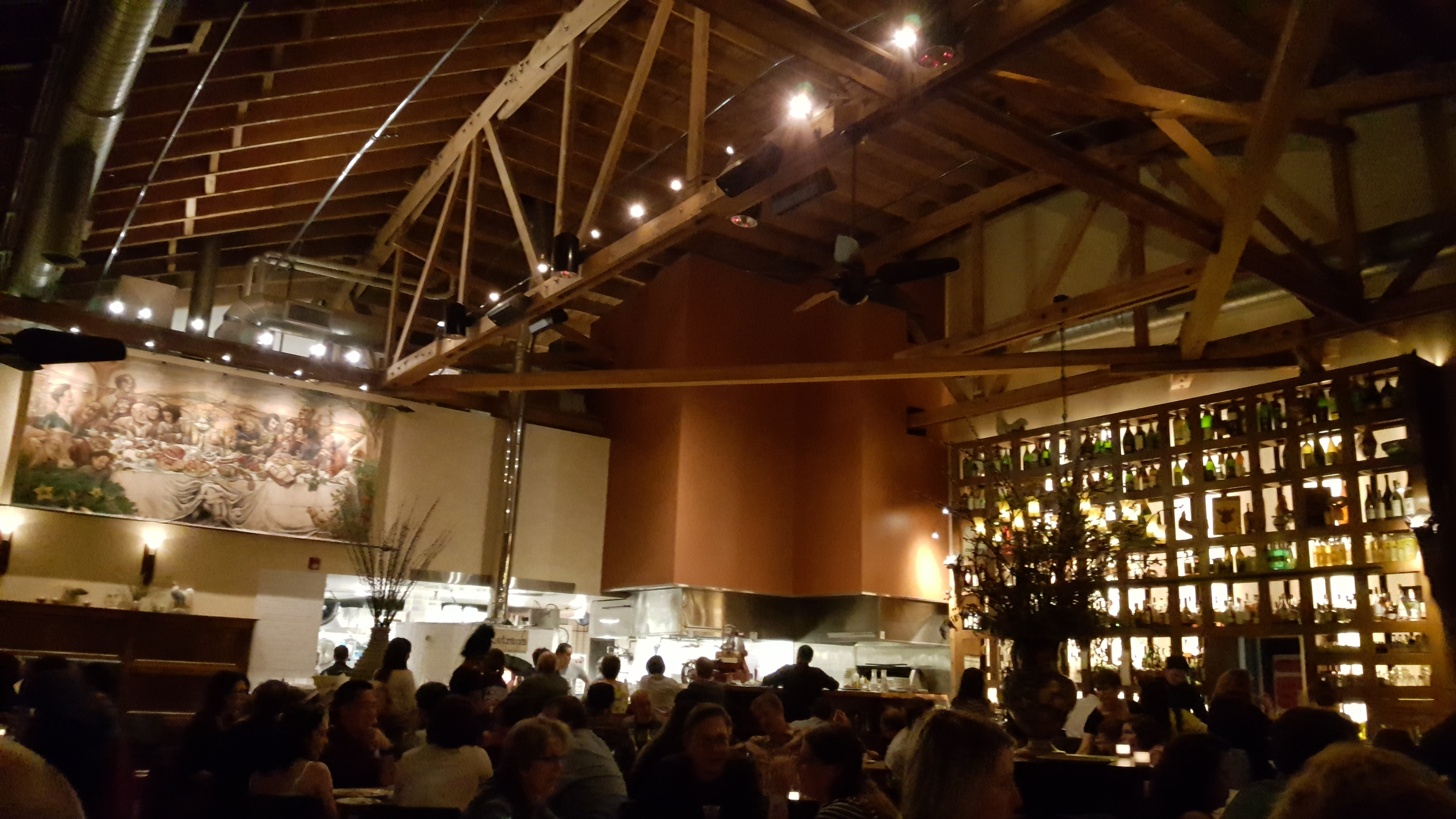
Interior, 2019

Nostrana was included in The Oregonian's 2012 overview of the city's best pizza and 2014 list of Portland's ten best restaurants bars. Nostrana ranked number 6 in the paper's 2015 list of Portland's 101 best restaurants, and number 3 on the same list in 2016. In 2017, The Oregonian's Michael Russell wrote: "On a perfect night here, the famous radicchio salad, the al dente pastas draped in tomato-butter sauce or sage butter and the attentive service can make you think you're eating at the best restaurant in Portland. Even when the kitchen isn't firing on all cylinders, Nostrana remains the neighborhood Italian joint of your dreams." Nostrana ranked third in the best pasta restaurants category of The Oregonian's annual readers choice awards in 2024. It ranked second in the best restaurant category of the same poll in 2025.

In 2005, Willamette Week contributor Roger Porter described Nostrana as "a rustic yet beautiful Italian restaurant with a kitchen that turns out some of the most honest, authentic food in the city". The newspaper's Martin Cizmar wrote a review in 2016 called, "Nostrana Is What People Mean When They Ask for 'A Nice Italian Place with Good Wine'", in which he described Nostrana as "a classic" restaurant with "a steady, restrained fine-touching that delights traditionalists". Nostrana was included in Willamette Week's 2016 lists "My Oh My, Portland's 8 Best Pizza Pies" and "Our Favorite Italian Spots in Portland", as well as the 2017 list of best restaurants along southeast Portland's Belmont and Hawthorne districts. Nostrana was also included in the paper's lists of the city's best happy hours.

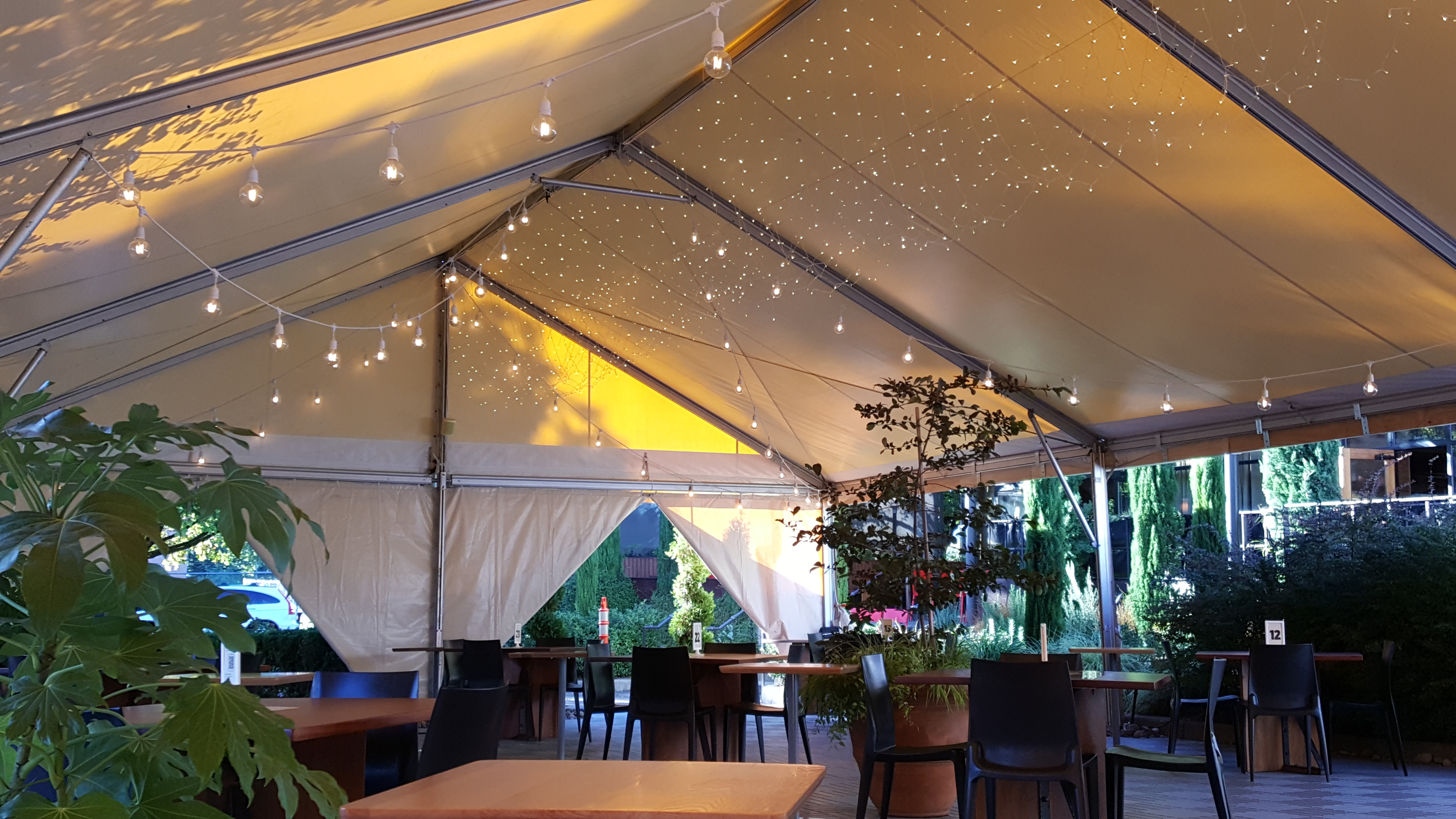
Tent for outdoor dining in October 2020, during the COVID-19 pandemic

In her Insiders' Guide to Portland, Oregon books, Rachel Dresbeck called the Neapolitan pizzas and desserts "outstanding", and wrote, "The grilled and rotisserie meats are perfectly done, sharing touches of Tuscany while being, at the same time, all Oregon." Julian Smith of Frommer's gave Nostrana two out of three stars, and said the restaurant hosts "one of the east-side's best happy hours". Sunset also recommended visiting for evening happy hour, available daily. Layla Schlack of Wine Enthusiast Magazine called Nostrana a "Portland institution" with a predominantly Old World wine list.

Erin DeJesus included Nostrana in Eater Portland's 2013 list of the twelve "best restaurants for dining solo" in the city, and its 2014 list of 38 "essential" Portland eateries. The website's Alex Frane included Nostrana in his 2018 list of Portland's "primo" Italian restaurants, in which he describes Nostrana as "lauded" and "legendary". Brooke Jackson-Glidden included the Insalata Nostrana in Eater Portland's 2024 overview of "iconic" Portland dishes. Nostrana was also included in the website's 2025 list of Portland's best Italian restaurants. Rebecca Roland included the butterscotch budino in Eater Portland's 2025 overview of the city's eleven best restaurants for desserts.

The restaurant was included in OpenTable's list of the 100 best restaurants "for wine lovers", according to data provided by more than twelve million verified reviews for more than 28,000 businesses in the U.S., collected between August 2017 and July 2018. Nostrana ranked fifteenth on The Daily Meal's 2019 list of the 75 most romantic restaurants in the United States. Zagat gives the restaurant ratings of 4.5 for food, 4.3 for decor, and 4.4 for service, each on a scale of 5. Hannah Wallace included the business in Condé Nast Traveler's 2025 list of Portland's 23 best restaurants. The business was included in Portland Monthly's 2025 list of 25 restaurants "that made Portland".

== Enoteca Nostrana ==
Nostrana's "sister" wine bar, Enoteca Nostrana, opened next door to the restaurant in 2018. The 1,500-square-foot (140 m^{2}), 40-seat bar emphasizes European and natural wines and has a modern aesthetic compared to Nostrana's "rustic" atmosphere. Enoteca Nostrana's interior features Italian design and a two-story wine cellar made of glass and steel, capable of storing 3,000 bottles. The bar's opening selection featured 130 wines.

Condé Nast Traveler's Hannah Wallace described Enoteca Nostrana as "splashy", with a "short but fabulous" menu. She recommended select antipasti options and wrote, "Because of its stylish ambience, this restaurant feels like a quick jaunt to Europe." Brooke Jackson-Glidden of Eater Portland called the bar "glammed-out" and "glitzy", and noted the availability of pizzas from Nostrana during afternoon happy hour. Enoteca Nostrana won in the design category in Eater Portland's 2018 Eater Awards, which recognize the city's best new chefs and businesses in the restaurant industry. In her review of Enoteca Nostrana, Wine & Spirits' Kerry Newberry wrote, "the space evokes Milan more than Portland, with bold geometric flair [and] mod barstools shaped like Champagne corks".

== See also ==
- List of Italian restaurants
- Pizza in Portland, Oregon
