= Tercet (restaurant) =

Defunct restaurant in Portland, Oregon, U.S.

- Interactive map of Tercet

Restaurant information
- Established: November 2021
- Closed: November 2023
- Chef: John Conlin; Wyatt VandenBerghe
- Location: 515 Southwest Broadway #10, Portland, Multnomah, Oregon, 97205, United States
- Coordinates: 45.5206°N 122.6792°W

Tercet was a fine dining restaurant in Portland, Oregon. It operated in southwest Portland's Morgan Building from 2021 to 2023, with John Conlin, and Wyatt VandenBerghe as chefs and Michael Branton as the sommelier.

== Description ==
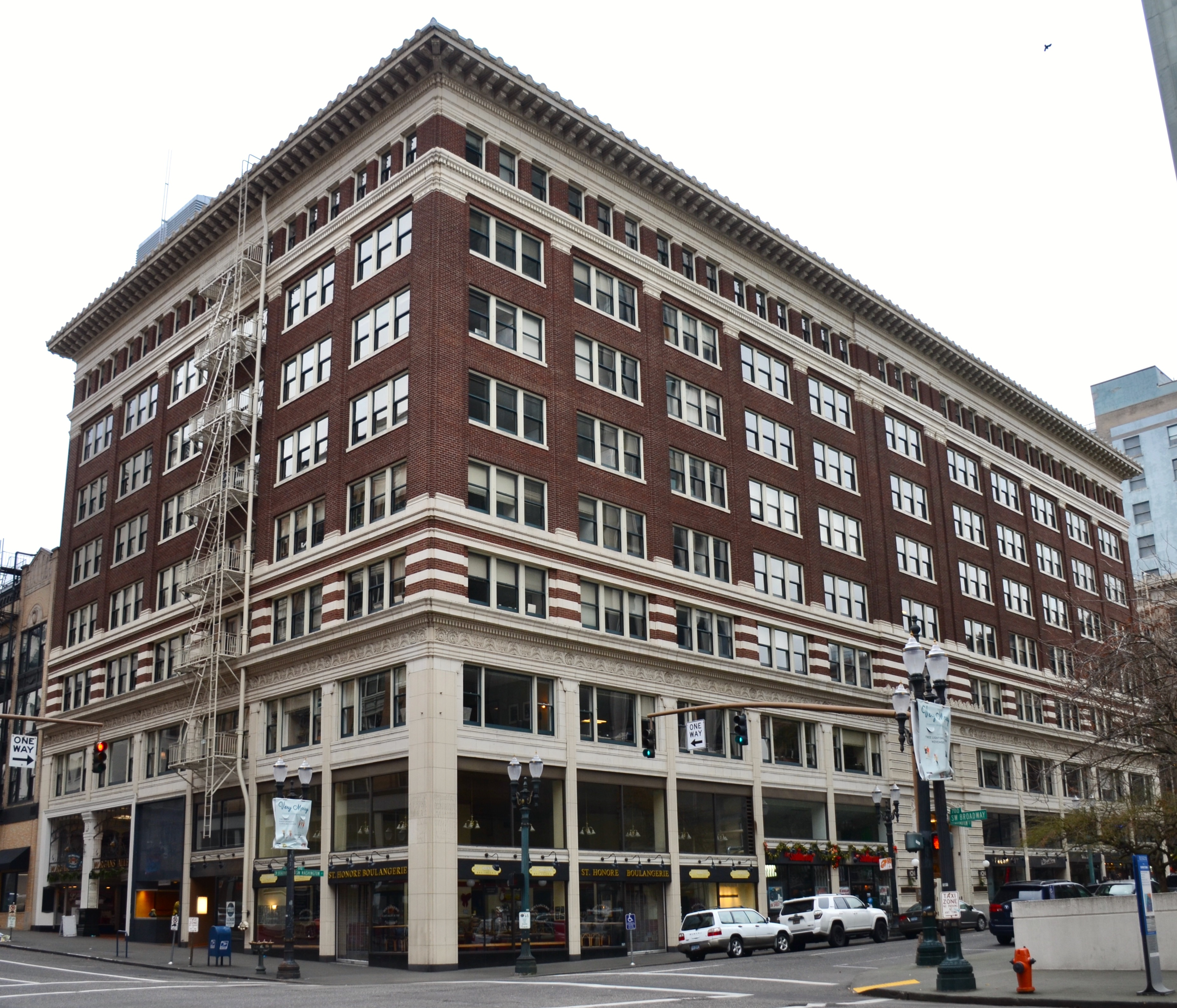
Tercet operated in southwest Portland's Morgan Building (pictured in 2018) from 2021 to 2023.

The fine dining restaurant Tercet operated in southwest Portland's Morgan Building. The interior has an open kitchen, dark wood, and industrial chandeliers. The menu included seafood, Oregon produce, goat with blueberries, eggplant, and Padrón peppers, as well as fig and cheese tarts, oysters, sourdough, and sherbet. Tercet also served: duck; caramelle pasta with celery and escargot; a whey sorbet; a chocolate torte with a coffee creme diplomat; and goat sugo with tagliatelle, fig leaf oil and Parmesan.

== History ==
Tercet opened in November 2021, following a rebrand of the seafood restaurant Roe, which closed in 2020 because of the COVID-19 pandemic. John Conlin, who was the last head chef at Roe, and Wyatt VandenBerghe were chefs at Tercet, and Michael Branton was the sommelier.

In November 2023, Conlin announced plans to close Tercet permanently.

== Reception ==
Andrea Damewood included the oyster with cucumber granita in Portland Mercury's overview of the "best bites from Portland chefs and restaurants" in 2022. Lindsay Mattison included Tercet in Tasting Table's 2023 list of Portland's forty best restaurants. In Portland Monthly's overview of the city's "biggest restaurant moves" in 2023, Katherine Chew Hamilton said Tercet served "magical" dinners.

== See also ==
- List of seafood restaurants
