= Navarre (restaurant) =

Restaurant in Portland, Oregon, U.S.

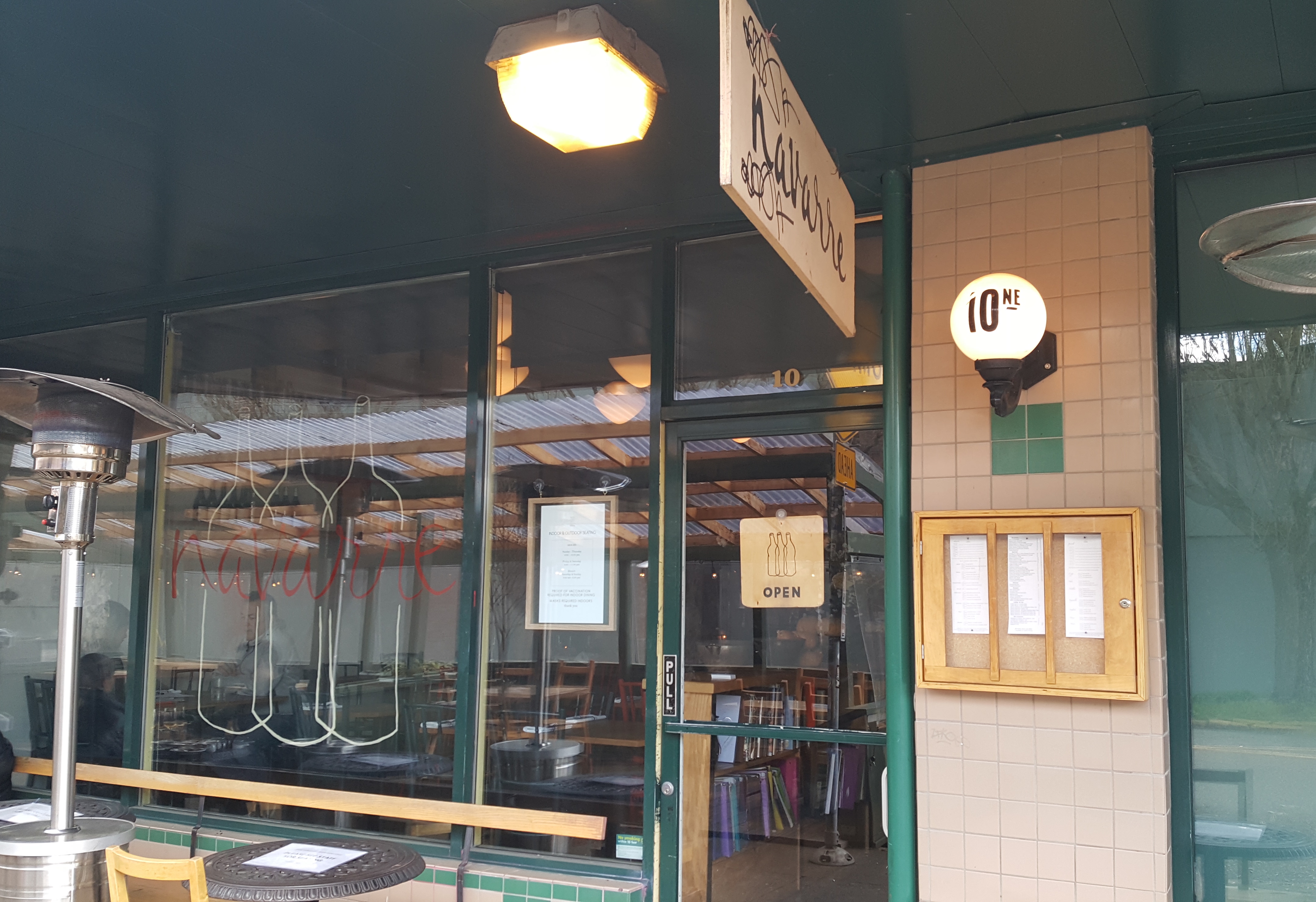
- The restaurant's exterior, 2022
- Interactive map of Navarre

Restaurant information
- Food type: Mediterranean
- Location: 10 Northeast 28th Avenue, Portland, Multnomah, Oregon, 97232, United States
- Coordinates: 45.5231°N 122.6371°W
- Website: navarreportland.com

Navarre is a restaurant in Portland, Oregon, United States.

== Description ==
Nick Wood of Eater Portland wrote: "With a menu featuring French, Spanish, and Italian small and large plates, Navarre tastes and feels like a neighborhood European restaurant. While ordering off a checklist like a sushi restaurant or dim sum feels awkward at first, your patience is rewarded with dishes like succulent hanger steak with a crisp crust, Roman-style artichokes with tender stems and luscious hearts, bright pickled vegetables, and smooth and rich pork and foie gras pâtés that do not skimp on the foie. With about 50 wines available in half pours, a variety of different European ones can be tasted relatively inexpensively."

== History ==
John Toboada is the chef and owner. Plans to expand the restaurant were announced in 2012.

== Reception ==
Erin DeJesus of Eater Portland included Navarre in a 2013 list of "The 12 Best Restaurants for Dining Solo in Portland". The website's Nick Woo included the business in a 2018 overview of "Where to Eat, Drink, and Relax on East 28th’s Underrated Restaurant Row". Navarre was also included in the website's 2025 list of Portland's best brunch restaurants. Michael Russell ranked Navarre number 31 in The Oregonian's 2025 list of Portland's 40 best restaurants. The business was included in Portland Monthly's 2025 list of 25 restaurants "that made Portland".
