= Pietro Belluschi =

American architect (1899–1994)

- Born: August 18, 1899; Ancona, Marche, Italy
- Died: February 14, 1994 (aged 94); Portland, Oregon, U.S.
- Occupation: Architect
- Awards: AIA Gold Medal; National Medal of Arts
- Buildings: Equitable Building; Cathedral of Saint Mary of the Assumption

Pietro Belluschi (August 18, 1899 – February 14, 1994) was an Italian-American architect. A leading figure in modern architecture, he was responsible for the design of over 1,000 buildings.

Born in Ancona, Italy, Belluschi began his architectural career as a draftsman in a Portland, Oregon firm. He achieved a national reputation within about 20 years, largely for his 1947 aluminum-clad Equitable Building. In 1951, he was named the dean of the MIT School of Architecture and Planning, where he served until 1965, also working as collaborator and design consultant for many high-profile commissions, most famously the 1963 Pan Am Building. He won the American Institute of Architects' Gold Medal in 1972.

== Early life ==
Pietro Belluschi was born in Ancona, Italy, in 1899. He grew up in Italy and served in the Italian armed forces during World War I when Italy was allied with Great Britain, France, and later the United States. Serving in the army he fought against the Austrians at the battles of Caporetto and Vittorio Veneto. After the war, Belluschi studied at the University of Rome, earning a degree in civil engineering in 1922.

He moved to the United States in 1923, despite speaking no English, and finished his education—as an exchange student on a scholarship—at Cornell University with a second degree in civil engineering. Instead of returning to Italy, he worked briefly as a mining engineer in Idaho earning $5 per day, but he then joined the architectural office of A. E. Doyle in Portland, living in Goose Hollow. He remained in the U.S., as friends in Italy had cautioned him to not return home because of the rise to power of Benito Mussolini and the Fascist government.

== Career ==
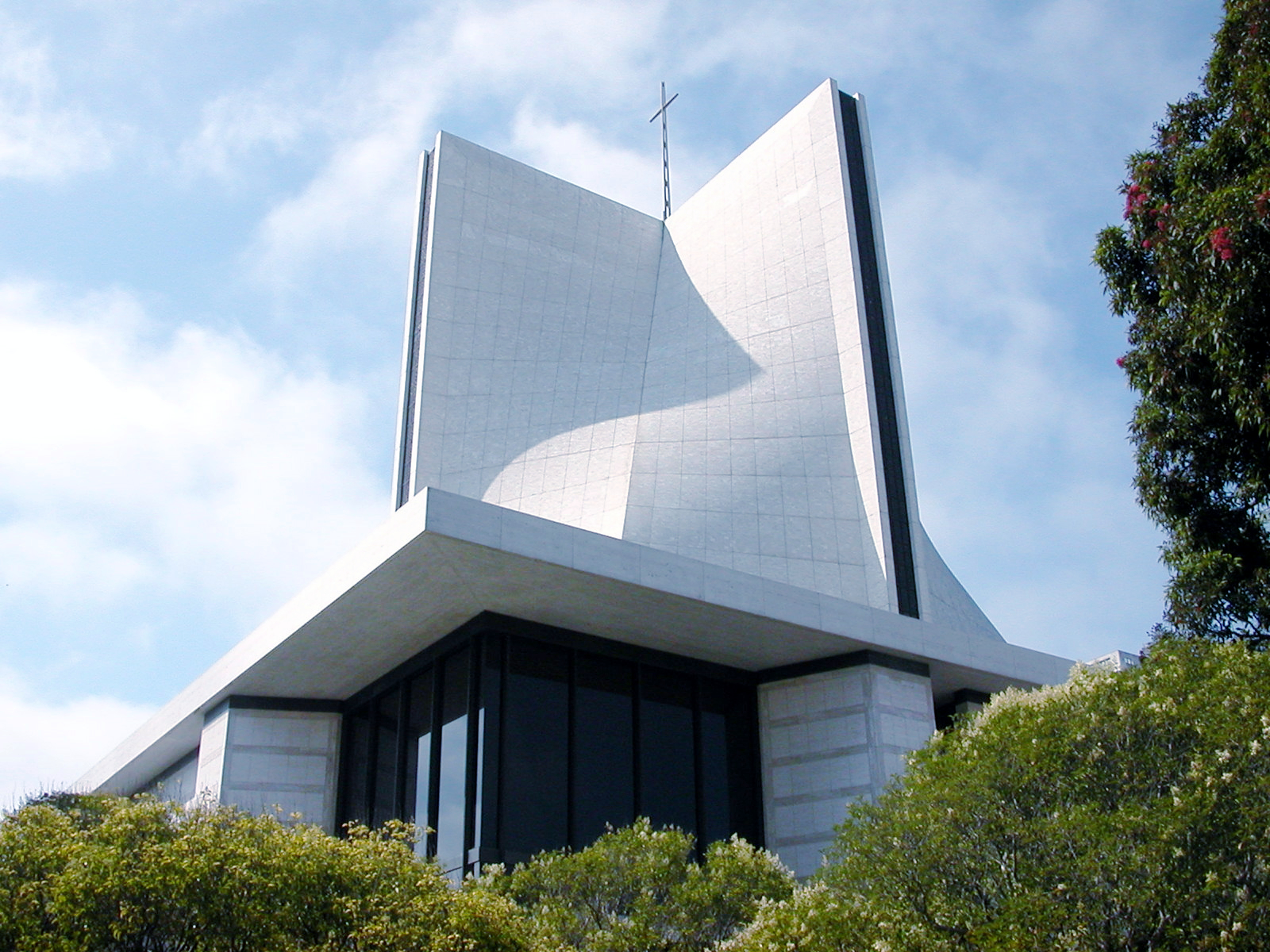
Cathedral of Saint Mary of the Assumption in San Francisco

At Doyle's office, Belluschi rose rapidly, soon becoming chief designer. After Doyle died in 1928, the firm took him into partnership in 1933. By 1943, Belluschi had assumed control of the firm by buying out all the other partners and was practicing under his own name.

In 1951, Belluschi became Dean of the architecture and planning school at the Massachusetts Institute of Technology, a position he held until 1965. When he accepted the position of dean and moved to Massachusetts, he transferred his office in Portland to the architecture firm Skidmore, Owings and Merrill. The move reduced his annual income from $150,000 to a salary of $15,000, but was prompted by health concerns attributable to the long hours of managing his office while still designing buildings.

Belluschi emerged as a leader in the development of American Modern architecture, with the design of several buildings reflecting the influence of the International Style and his awareness of the technological opportunities of new materials. Most important was the Equitable Building (1944–47) in Portland, Oregon: a concrete frame office block clad in aluminum, and considered the first office building with a completely sealed air-conditioned environment.

Belluschi's churches and residences differed from his commercial works. Although of Modern design, they fit within the development of the Pacific Northwest regional Modern idiom as they frequently used regional materials (particularly wood) and were often integrated with their suburban or rural sites.

== Awards and honors ==
Belluschi was elected a Fellow of the American Academy of Arts and Sciences in 1952. In 1953, he was elected into the National Academy of Design as an Associate member, and became a full member in 1957. He served as a presidential appointee on the U.S. Commission of Fine Arts from 1950 to 1955. He was a Fellow in the American Institute of Architects (AIA), and was awarded the AIA Gold Medal, the highest award given by the institute, in 1972. He was awarded the National Medal of Arts by the National Endowment for the Arts in 1991 for his lifetime achievements. Belluschi was on the jury that selected the winning design for the Vietnam Veterans Memorial in Washington, D.C.

== Later life ==
After leaving MIT in 1965, he continued to work. Belluschi would design and consult on both buildings and issues surrounding urban planning. Pietro Belluschi was married first to Helen Hemmila on December 1, 1934, the mother of his two sons, Peter and Anthony. His son Anthony Belluschi is an architect. After his wife's death in 1962, he married in 1965 to Marjorie Bruckner (1920–2009). Pietro Belluschi died in Portland on February 14, 1994.

== Selected works ==
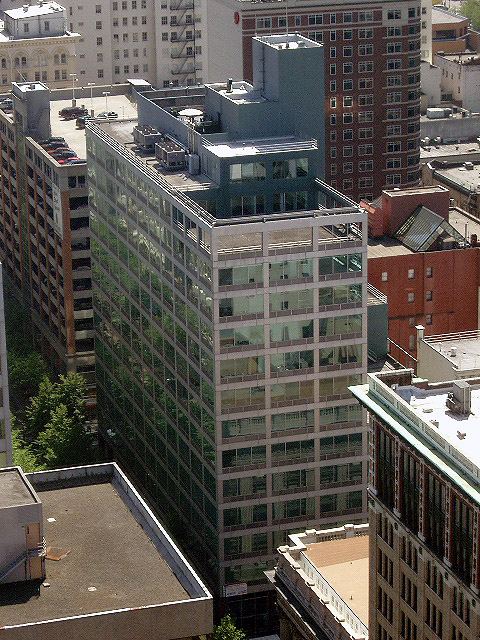
Commonwealth Building in Portland.

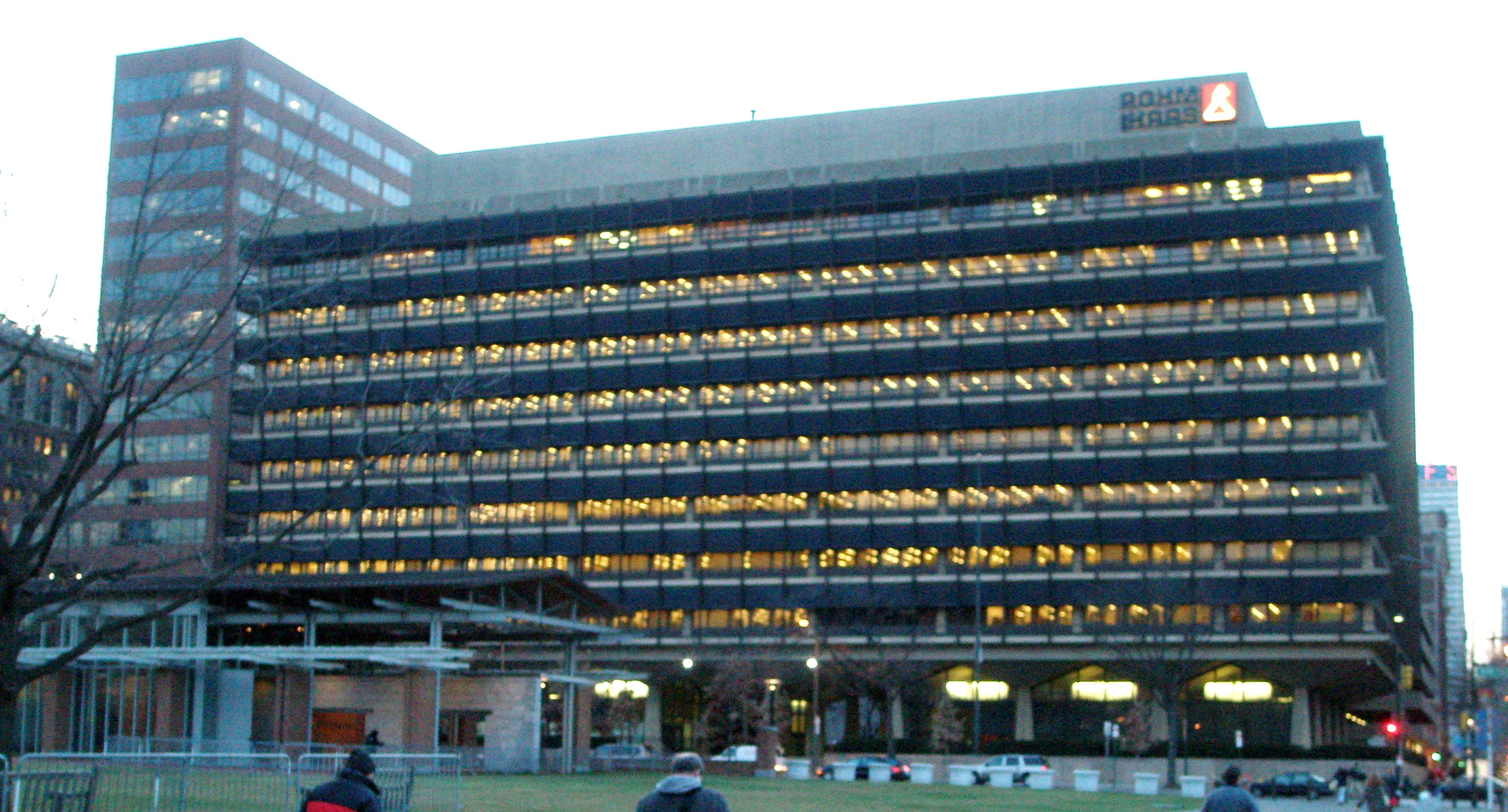
Rohm and Haas

Belluschi's designs include:

- Pacific Telephone and Telegraph Company Building, southern addition, Portland, 1926
- Pacific Building, Portland, 1926
- Public Service Building, Portland, 1927
- Belluschi Building, Portland Art Museum (NRHP), 1932
- Guardians' Lodge (1929), Kiwanis Lodge (1931), Uncle Toby's Story House (1932), and Blue Wing Lodge (1936), Camp Namanu, Sandy, Oregon
- Northrup Library (now T. J. Day Hall) at Linfield University, McMinnville, 1936
- Library Building (now Smullin Hall) at Willamette University, Salem, 1938
- St. Thomas More Catholic Church, Portland, 1940
- Peter Kerr House, Gearhart, Oregon, 1941
- Chapel, River View Cemetery, Portland, 1942
- Korten Music Store, Longview, Washington, 1946
- Sweeney, Straub and Dimm Printing Plant, Portland (NRHP), 1946
- Emmanuel Lutheran Church, Longview, Washington, 1946
- Burkes House, Portland, 1947
- Coats House, 3600 Whiskey Creek Rd, Netarts, 1942
- Oregonian Building, Portland, 1947
- Baxter Hall and Collins Hall, Willamette University, Salem, 1947
- Charles and Blanche Sprague Weekend House, also known as Thetford Lodge, Little North Santiam River, Oregon, 1947
- Psychology Building, Reed College, Portland, 1947–1948
- Breitenbush Hall, Oregon State Hospital, Salem (NRHP), 1948 (demolished 2017)
- Equitable Building, Portland, 1948
- First Presbyterian Church, Cottage Grove, Oregon (NRHP), 1948
- Percy L. Menefee Ranch House, Yamhill, Oregon, 1948
- Sacred Heart Church, Lake Oswego, Oregon, 1949
- Zion Lutheran Church, Portland (NRHP), 1950
- Federal Reserve Bank of San Francisco, Portland Branch, 1950
- Central Lutheran Church, Portland, 1951
- St. Philip Neri Catholic Church, Portland, 1952
- Tucker Maxon School, Portland, 1953
- YWCA building, Salem, 1954
- Marion County Courthouse and World War II Memorial, Salem, 1954
- Trinity Lutheran Church, Walnut Creek, California, 1954
- Temple Israel, Swampcott, Massachusetts, 1953-1956
- First Lutheran Church, Boston, 1954–1957
- Cedar Lane Unitarian Universalist Church, Bethesda, Maryland, 1955
- Temple Adath Israel of the Main Line, with Charles Frederick Wise, Merion, Pennsylvania, 1956–1957
- Church of the Redeemer (Baltimore), 1958
- Bennington College Library, Bennington, Vermont, 1957–1958
- Central Lutheran Church, Eugene, Oregon, 1959
- Temple B'rith Kodesh, Rochester, New York, 1959–1963
- Goucher College Center, Towson, Maryland, 1960
- Trinity Episcopal Church, Concord, Massachusetts, dedicated October 6, 1963
- First Methodist Church, Duluth, Minnesota, 1962–1969
- The Alice Tully Hall at the Juilliard School within the Lincoln Center, New York City, 1963–1969
- Pan Am Building, Belluschi and Walter Gropius as design consultants to Emery Roth & Sons, New York City, 1963
- Rohm and Haas Corporate Headquarters, with George M. Ewing Co., Philadelphia, Pennsylvania, 1964
- Church of the Christian Union, Rockford, Illinois, 1964-1965
- Hoffman Columbia Plaza, now Unitus Plaza, Portland, 1966
- Immanuel Lutheran Church, Silverton, Oregon, 1966
- Saint Joseph's Roman Catholic Church, Roseburg, Oregon, 1968
- 555 California Street, as consultant to Wurster, Benardi and Emmons and Skidmore, Owings and Merrill, San Francisco, 1969
- One Boston Place, with Emery Roth & Sons, Boston, 1970
- Tower Square, also known as BayState West, with Eduardo Catalano, Springfield, Massachusetts, 1970
- University of Virginia School of Architecture, 1970
- Woodbrook Baptist Church, Towson, Maryland, 1970
- Cathedral of Saint Mary of the Assumption, San Francisco (collaborating with Pier Luigi Nervi and others), 1971
- Clark Art Institute, with The Architects Collaborative, Williamstown, Massachusetts, 1973
- 100 East Pratt Street, with Emery Roth & Sons, Baltimore, 1975
- Joseph Meyerhoff Symphony Hall, Baltimore, 1978–1982
- Louise M. Davies Symphony Hall, with Skidmore, Owings and Merrill, San Francisco, 1980
- One Financial Center, Boston, 1983
- US Bancorp Tower, as consultant to Skidmore, Owings and Merrill, Portland, 1983
- Chapel of Christ the Teacher, University of Portland, 1986
- United Hebrew Congregation, Chesterfield, Missouri, 1986–1989
- Murray Hills Christian Church, Beaverton, Oregon (1987–89)
- Centennial Tower and Wheeler Sports Center, George Fox University, Newberg, Oregon, 1991 and 1977
- Portsmouth Abbey School campus, Portsmouth, Rhode Island; Belluschi designed 14 of the 27 buildings on campus between 1960 and 1991
