= Geothermal heating =

Use of geothermal energy for heating

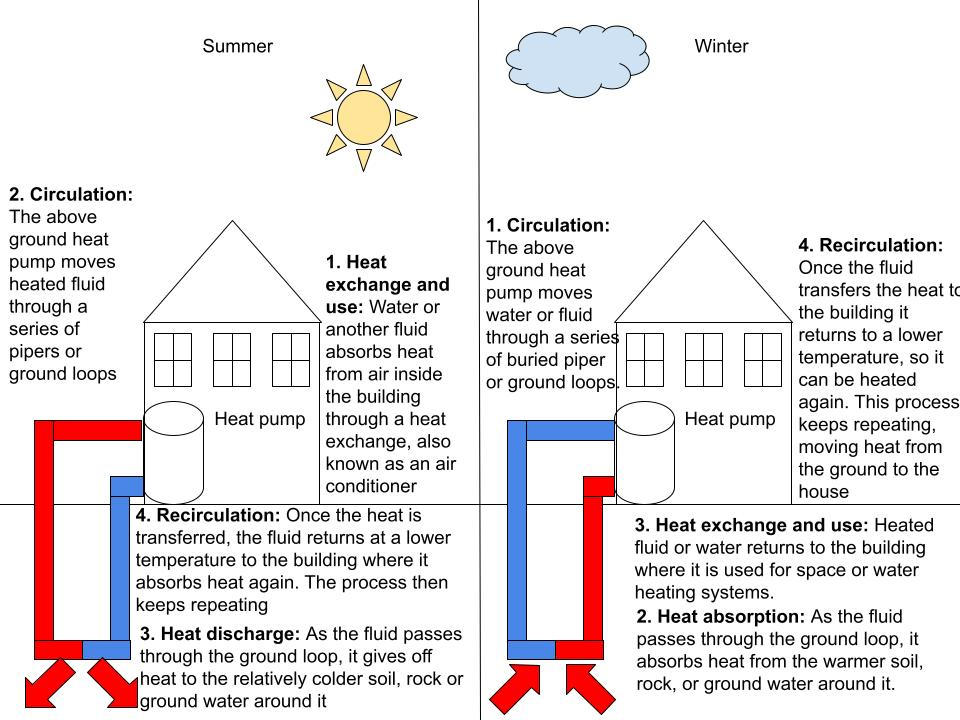
Geothermal heating

Geothermal heating is the direct use of geothermal energy for some heating applications. Humans have taken advantage of geothermal heat this way since the Paleolithic era. Approximately seventy countries made direct use of a total of 270 PJ of geothermal heating in 2004. As of 2007, 28 GW of geothermal heating capacity is installed around the world, satisfying 0.07% of global primary energy consumption. Thermal efficiency is high since no energy conversion is needed, but capacity factors tend to be low (around 20%) since the heat is mostly needed in the winter.

Geothermal energy originates from the heat retained within the Earth since the original formation of the planet, from radioactive decay of minerals, and from solar energy absorbed at the surface. Most high temperature geothermal heat is harvested in regions close to tectonic plate boundaries where volcanic activity rises close to the surface of the Earth. In these areas, ground and groundwater can be found with temperatures higher than the target temperature of the application. However, even cold ground contains heat. Below 6 metres (20 ft), the undisturbed ground temperature is consistently at the mean annual air temperature, and this heat can be extracted with a ground source heat pump.

== Applications ==
Top countries using the most geothermal heating in 2005
Country	Production PJ/yr	Capacity GW	Capacity factor	Dominant applications
China	45.38	3.69	39%	bathing
Sweden	43.2	4.2	33%	heat pumps
USA	31.24	7.82	13%	heat pumps
Turkey	24.84	1.5	53%	district heating
Iceland	24.5	1.84	42%	district heating
Japan	10.3	0.82	40%	bathing (onsens)
Hungary	7.94	0.69	36%	spas/greenhouses
Italy	7.55	0.61	39%	spas/space heating
New Zealand	7.09	0.31	73%	industrial uses
63 others	71	6.8		
Total	273	28	31%	space heating

Direct use of geothermal heat by category in 2015 as adapted from John W. Lund
Category	GWh/year
Geothermal heat pumps	90,293
Bathing and swimming	33,164
Space heating	24,508
Greenhouse heating	7,407
Aquaculture pond heating	3,322
Industrial uses	2,904
Cooling/snow melting	722
Agriculture drying	564
Others	403
Total	163,287

There are a wide variety of applications for cheap geothermal heat including heating of houses, greenhouses, bathing and swimming or industrial uses. Most applications use geothermal in the form of hot fluids between 50 °C (122 °F) and 150 °C (302 °F). The suitable temperature varies for the different applications. For direct use of geothermal heat, the temperature range for the agricultural sector lies between 25 °C (77 °F) and 90 °C (194 °F), for space heating lies between 50 °C (122 °F) to 100 °C (212 °F). Heat pipes extend the temperature range down to 5 °C (41 °F) as they extract and "amplify" the heat. Geothermal heat exceeding 150 °C (302 °F) is typically used for geothermal power generation.

In 2004 more than half of direct geothermal heat was used for space heating, and a third was used for spas. The remainder was used for a variety of industrial processes, desalination, domestic hot water, and agricultural applications. The cities of Reykjavík and Akureyri pipe hot water from geothermal plants under roads and pavements to melt snow. Geothermal desalination has been demonstrated.

Geothermal systems tend to benefit from economies of scale, so space heating power is often distributed to multiple buildings, sometimes whole communities. This technique, long practiced throughout the world in locations such as Reykjavík, Iceland; Boise, Idaho; and Klamath Falls, Oregon; is known as district heating.

In Europe alone 280 geothermal district heating plants were in operation in 2016 according to the European Geothermal Energy Council (EGEC) with a total capacity of approximately 4.9 GWth.

== Extraction ==
Some parts of the world, including substantial portions of the western US, are underlain by relatively shallow geothermal resources. Similar conditions exist in Iceland, parts of Japan, and other geothermal hot spots around the world. In these areas, water or steam may be captured from natural hot springs and piped directly into radiators or heat exchangers. Alternatively, the heat may come from waste heat supplied by co-generation from a geothermal electrical plant or from deep wells into hot aquifers. Direct geothermal heating is far more efficient than geothermal electricity generation and has less demanding temperature requirements, so it is viable over a large geographical range. If the shallow ground is hot but dry, air or water may be circulated through earth tubes or downhole heat exchangers which act as heat exchangers with the ground.

Steam under pressure from deep geothermal resources is also used to generate electricity from geothermal power. The Iceland Deep Drilling Project struck a pocket of magma at 2,100 m (6,900 ft). A cemented steelcase was constructed in the hole with a perforation at the bottom close to the magma. The high temperatures and pressure of the magma steam were used to generate 36MW of electricity, making IDDP-1 the world's first magma-enhanced geothermal system.

In areas where the shallow ground is too cold to provide comfort directly, it is still warmer than the winter air. The thermal inertia of the shallow ground retains solar energy accumulated in the summertime, and seasonal variations in ground temperature disappear completely below 10 m (33 ft) of depth. That heat can be extracted with a geothermal heat pump more efficiently than it can be generated by conventional furnaces. Geothermal heat pumps are economically viable essentially anywhere in the world.

In theory, geothermal energy (usually cooling) can also be extracted from existing infrastructure, such as municipal water pipes.

== Ground-source heat pumps ==
In regions without any high temperature geothermal resources, a ground-source heat pump (GSHP) can provide space heating and space cooling. Like a refrigerator or air conditioner, these systems use a heat pump to force the transfer of heat from the ground to the building. Heat can be extracted from any source, no matter how cold, but a warmer source allows higher efficiency. A ground-source heat pump uses the shallow ground or ground water (typically starting at 10–12 °C or 50–54 °F) as a source of heat, thus taking advantage of its seasonally moderate temperatures. In contrast, an air source heat pump draws heat from the air (colder outside air) and thus requires more energy.

GSHPs circulate a carrier fluid (usually a mixture of water and small amounts of antifreeze) through closed pipe loops buried in the ground. Single-home systems can be "vertical loop field" systems with bore holes 50–400 feet (15–120 m) deep or, if adequate land is available for extensive trenches, a "horizontal loop field" is installed approximately six feet subsurface. As the fluid circulates underground it absorbs heat from the ground and, on its return, the warmed fluid passes through the heat pump which uses electricity to extract heat from the fluid. The re-chilled fluid is sent back into the ground thus continuing the cycle. The heat extracted and that generated by the heat pump appliance as a byproduct is used to heat the house. The addition of the ground heating loop in the energy equation means that significantly more heat can be transferred to a building than if electricity alone had been used directly for heating.

Switching the direction of heat flow, the same system can be used to circulate the cooled water through the house for cooling in the summer months. The heat is exhausted to the relatively cooler ground (or groundwater) rather than delivering it to the hot outside air as an air conditioner does. As a result, the heat is pumped across a larger temperature difference and this leads to higher efficiency and lower energy use.

This technology makes ground source heating economically viable in any geographical location. In 2004, an estimated million ground-source heat pumps with a total capacity of 15 GW extracted 88 PJ of heat energy for space heating. Global ground-source heat pump capacity is growing by 10% annually.

== History ==
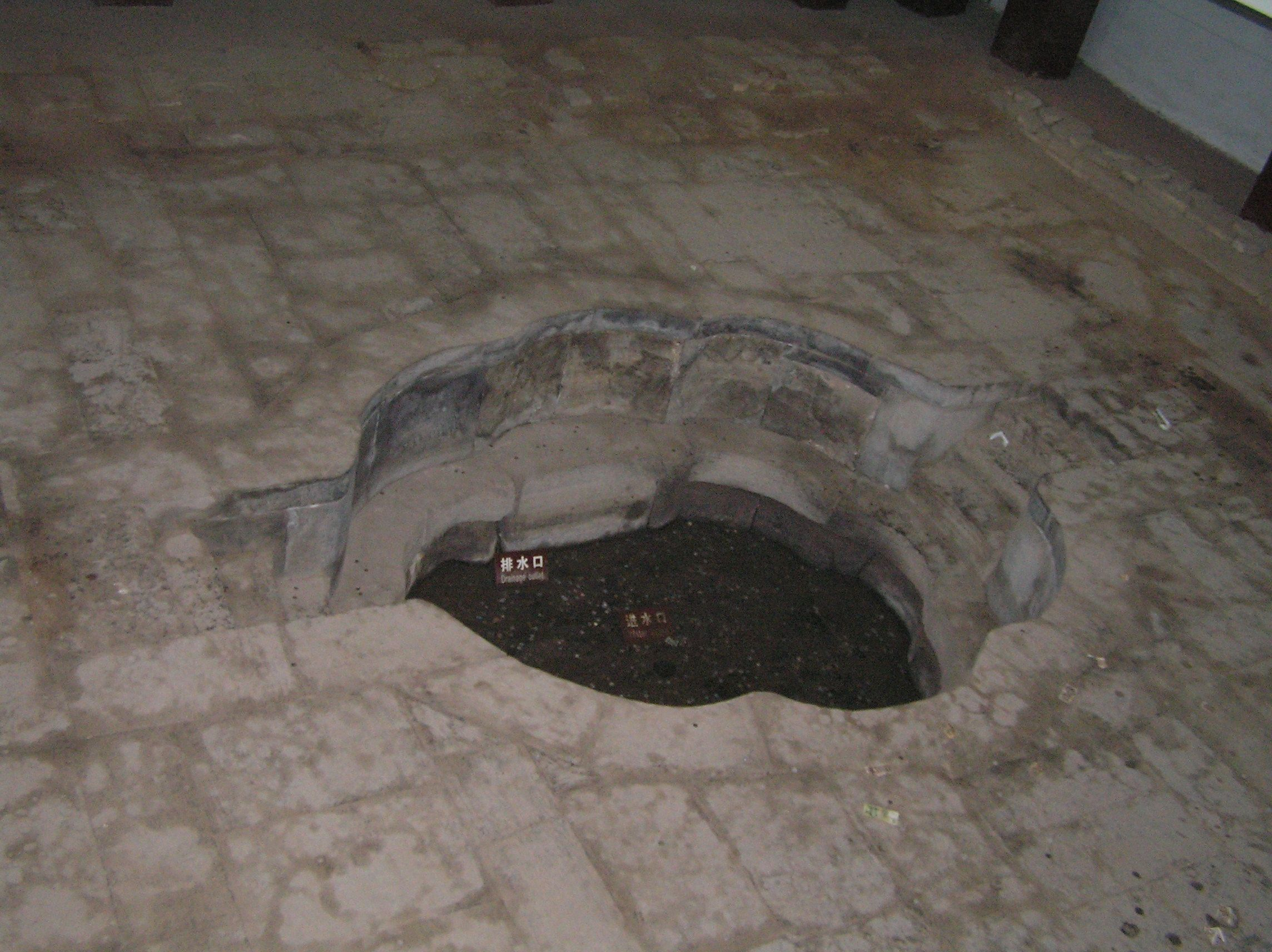
The oldest known pool fed by a hot spring, built in the Qin dynasty in the 3rd century BC

Hot springs have been used for bathing at least since Paleolithic times. The oldest known spa is a stone pool on China's Mount Li built in the Qin dynasty in the 3rd century BC, at the same site where the Huaqing Chi palace was later built. Geothermal energy supplied channeled district heating for baths and houses in Pompeii around 0 AD. In the first century AD, Romans conquered Aquae Sulis in England and used the hot springs there to feed public baths and underfloor heating. The admission fees for these baths probably represents the first commercial use of geothermal power. A 1,000-year-old hot tub has been located in Iceland, where it was built by one of the island's original settlers. The world's oldest working geothermal district heating system in Chaudes-Aigues, France, has been operating since the 14th century. The earliest industrial exploitation began in 1827 with the use of geyser steam to extract boric acid from volcanic mud in Larderello, Italy.

In 1892, America's first district heating system in Boise, Idaho, was powered directly by geothermal energy, and was soon copied in Klamath Falls, Oregon, in 1900. A deep geothermal well was used to heat greenhouses in Boise in 1926, and geysers were used to heat greenhouses in Iceland and Tuscany at about the same time. Charlie Lieb developed the first downhole heat exchanger in 1930 to heat his house. Steam and hot water from the geysers began to be used to heat homes in Iceland in 1943.

By this time, Lord Kelvin had already invented the heat pump in 1852, and Heinrich Zoelly had patented the idea of using it to draw heat from the ground in 1912. But it was not until the late 1940s that the geothermal heat pump was successfully implemented. The earliest one was probably Robert C. Webber's home-made 2.2 kW direct-exchange system, but sources disagree as to the exact timeline of his invention. J. Donald Kroeker designed the first commercial geothermal heat pump to heat the Commonwealth Building in Portland, Oregon, and demonstrated it in 1946. Professor Carl Nielsen of Ohio State University built the first residential open loop version in his home in 1948. The technology became popular in Sweden as a result of the 1973 oil crisis, and has been growing slowly in worldwide acceptance since then. The 1979 development of polybutylene pipe greatly augmented the heat pump's economic viability. Since 2000, a compelling body of research has been dedicated to numerically evidence the advantages and efficiency of using CO_{2}, alternative to water, as heat transmission fluid for geothermal energy recovery from enhanced geothermal systems (EGS) where the permeability of the underground source is enhanced by hydrofracturing. As of 2004, there are over one million geothermal heat pumps installed worldwide providing 12 GW of thermal capacity. Each year, about 80,000 units are installed in the US and 27,000 in Sweden.

== Economics ==
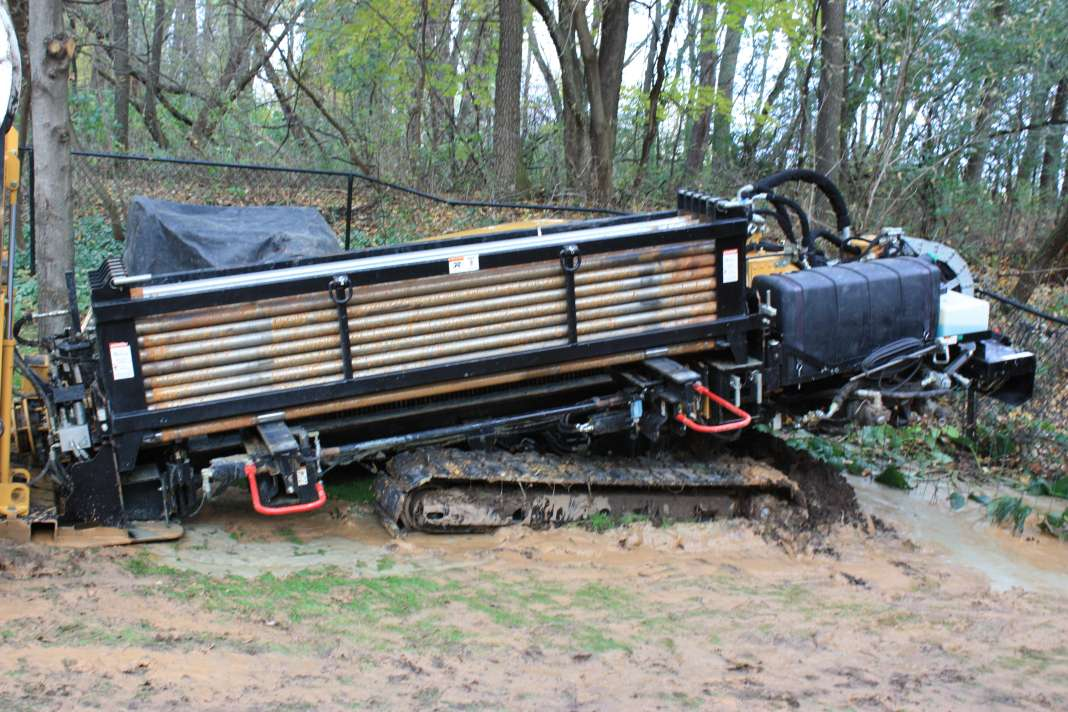
Geothermal drill machine

Geothermal energy is a type of renewable energy that encourages conservation of natural resources. According to the US Environmental Protection Agency, geo-exchange systems save homeowners 30–70 percent in heating costs, and 20–50 percent in cooling costs, compared to conventional systems. Geo-exchange systems also save money because they require much less maintenance. In addition to being highly reliable they are built to last for decades.

Some utilities, such as Kansas City Power and Light, offer special, lower winter rates for geothermal customers, offering even more savings.

== Geothermal drilling risks ==
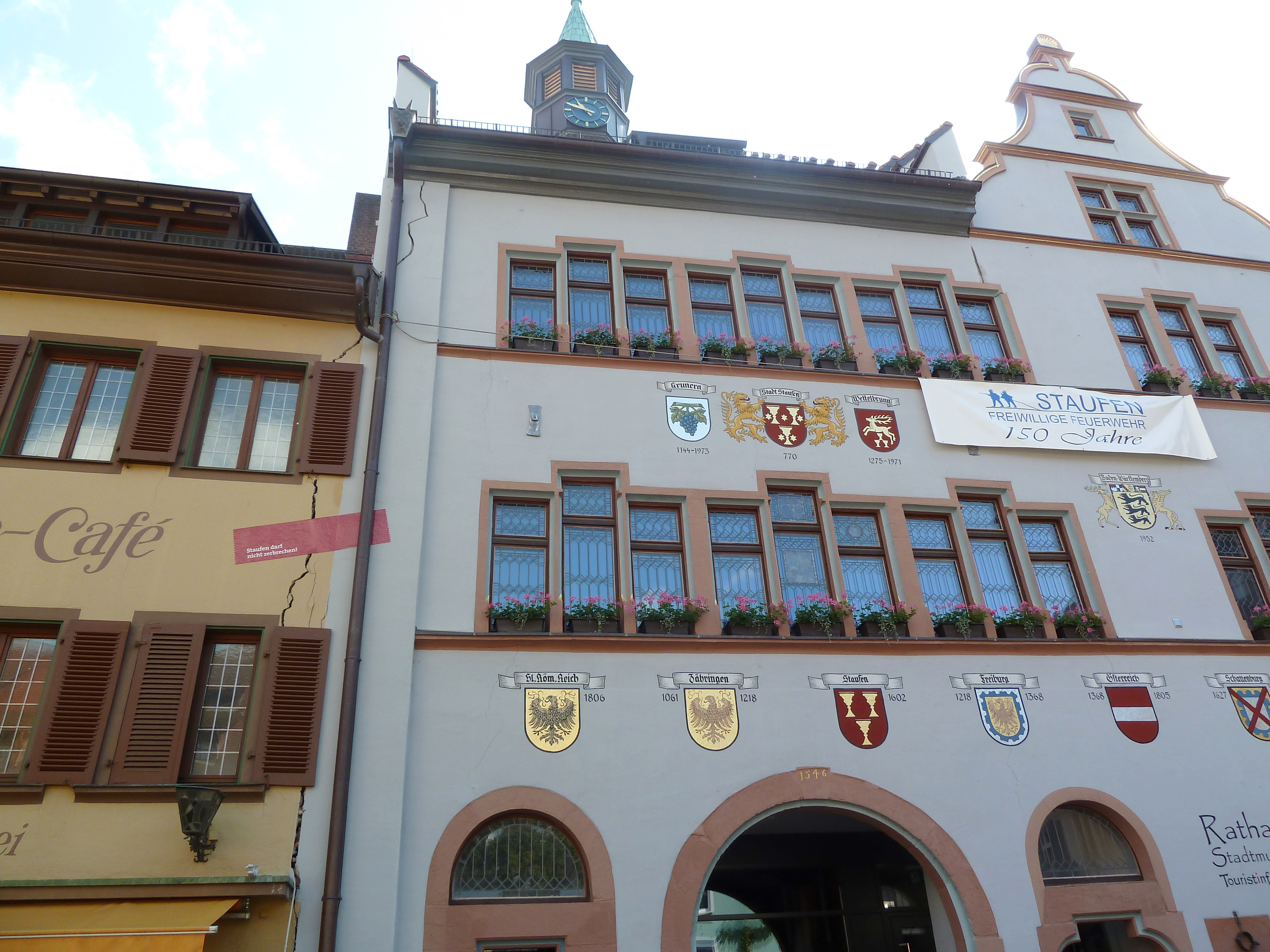
Cracks at the historic Town Hall of Staufen im Breisgau presumed due to damage from geothermal drilling

In geothermal heating projects the underground is penetrated by trenches or drillholes. As with all underground work, projects may cause problems if the geology of the area is poorly understood.

In the spring of 2007 an exploratory geothermal drilling operation was conducted to provide geothermal heat to the town hall of Staufen im Breisgau. After initially sinking a few millimeters, a process called subsidence, the city center has started to rise gradually causing considerable damage to buildings in the city center, affecting numerous historic houses including the town hall. It is hypothesized that the drilling perforated an anhydrite layer bringing high-pressure groundwater to come into contact with the anhydrite, which then began to expand. Currently no end to the rising process is in sight. Data from the TerraSAR-X radar satellite before and after the changes confirmed the localised nature of the situation:

A geochemical process called anhydrite swelling has been confirmed as the cause of these uplifts. This is a transformation of the mineral anhydrite (anhydrous calcium sulphate) into gypsum (hydrous calcium sulphate). A pre-condition for this transformation is that the anhydrite is in contact with water, which is then stored in its crystalline structure. There are other sources of potential risks, i.e.: cave enlargement or worsening of stability conditions, quality or quantity degradation of groundwater resources, Specific hazard worsening in the case of landslide-prone areas, worsening of rocky mechanical characteristics, soil and water pollution (i.e. due to antifreeze additives or polluting constructive and boring material). The design defined on the base of site-specific geological, hydrogeological and environmental knowledge prevent all these potential risks.

== See also ==
- Annualized geothermal solar
- Carnot's theorem (thermodynamics)
- Deep water source cooling
- District heating
- Geothermal gradient
- Geothermal power
- Geothermal heat pump
- Thermal battery
