= BHE =

BHE may be:

- Barnhouse Effect
- Before Human Era
- Berkshire Hathaway Energy
- Bharat Heavy Electricals Limited
- Block der Heimatsvertriebenen und Entrechteten, a 1950s West German political party.
- Borehole heat exchangers
- Bus High Enable a signal that indicates a data transfer on the highest byte on the processor bus
- IATA airport code for Woodbourne Airport, west of Blenheim in the South Island of New Zealand.
- Bischoff Hervey Entertainment, a media production company
