= Rohm and Haas Corporate Headquarters =

- U.S. National Register of Historic Places
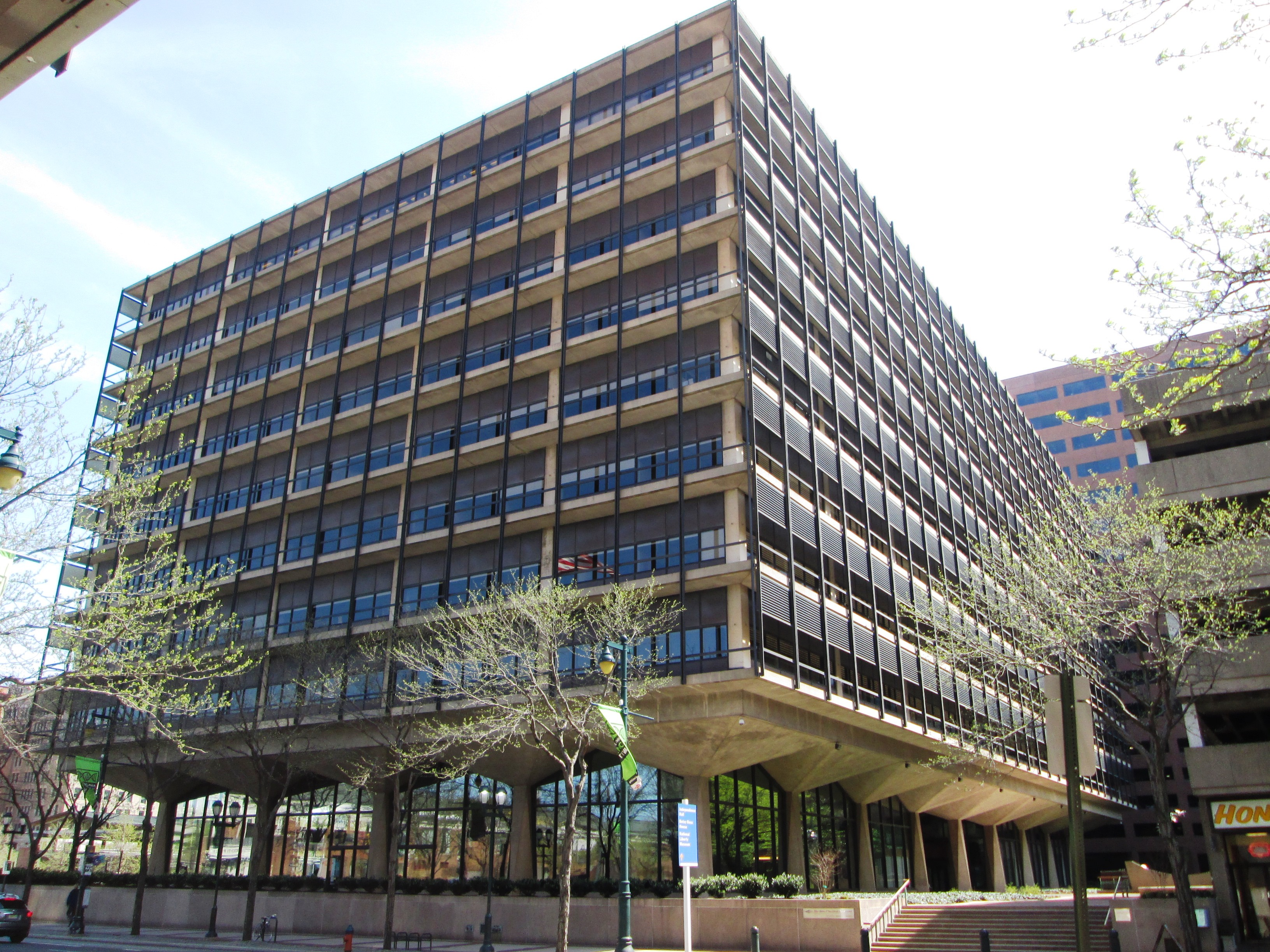
- Roh and Haas Building in Philadelphia in 2013

- Location within Philadelphia Location within Pennsylvania Location within the United States
- Location: 100 South Independence Mall West; Philadelphia, Pennsylvania, U.S.
- Coordinates: 39°57′1″N 75°9′5″W
- Built: 1964
- Architect: Pietro Belluschi; Alexander Ewing for George M. Ewing Co.
- Architectural style: International style
- NRHP reference No.: 07000031
- Added to NRHP: February 9, 2007

The Rohm and Haas Corporate Headquarters is a building in Philadelphia, Pennsylvania, United States. It was built as the headquarters for the former chemical manufacturing company Rohm and Haas. Completed in 1964, the building was the first private investment for the urban renewal of the Independence Mall area. Only two blocks from Independence Hall, the building, designed by Pietro Belluschi and George M. Ewing Co., was lauded for its respect to the nearby park and historical buildings. Philadelphia's city planners praised the Rohm and Haas Corporate Headquarters as a standard for all redevelopment buildings.

The nine-story building's most notable feature is its translucent, corrugated sunscreens. Supported by aluminum lattices throughout the building's facade, the sunscreens are made of Rohm and Haas's principal product, Plexiglas. In 2007 the Rohm and Haas Corporate Headquarters was listed on the National Register of Historic Places and today is considered one of the best examples of the International style.

== History ==
The Rohm and Haas Corporate Headquarters was conceived as part of the city of Philadelphia's plan to improve and revive the area around Independence Hall. Along with the creation of a park north of Independence Hall, the area saw the construction of new and modern buildings including a federal courthouse, a new Philadelphia Mint and the Rohm and Haas Building. For the revival of the Independence Mall area, city planner Edmund Bacon approached Otto Haas to move Rohm and Haas, a Philadelphia-based chemical manufacturing company, to Independence Mall. According to legend, Haas reportedly said, "This city may or may not survive. But if companies like Rohm and Haas desert it, then surely the city will not survive!" Federal funds for private investors investing in urban renewal land was also a significant factor in Rohm and Haas's decision to stay in Philadelphia.

In 1959 Rohm and Haas, the first private investor to build on the Independence Mall, first commissioned Philadelphia-based George M. Ewing Co. to design their new headquarters. Ewing's design was met with a poor response from the City Art Commission, and Rohm and Haas decided on using a leading architect and approached Pietro Belluschi. At the time the dean of architecture and planning at the Massachusetts Institute of Technology, Belluschi worked with George M. Ewing Co. to redesign Ewing's original plan. The new design was completed in a few months and was approved by Rohm and Haas, the City Planning Commission, the Redevelopment Authority, and the City Art Commission. Construction began in 1963 and was completed in 1964, costing close to US$10 million. Rohm and Haas moved from their old Washington Square headquarters into the new building in 1965.

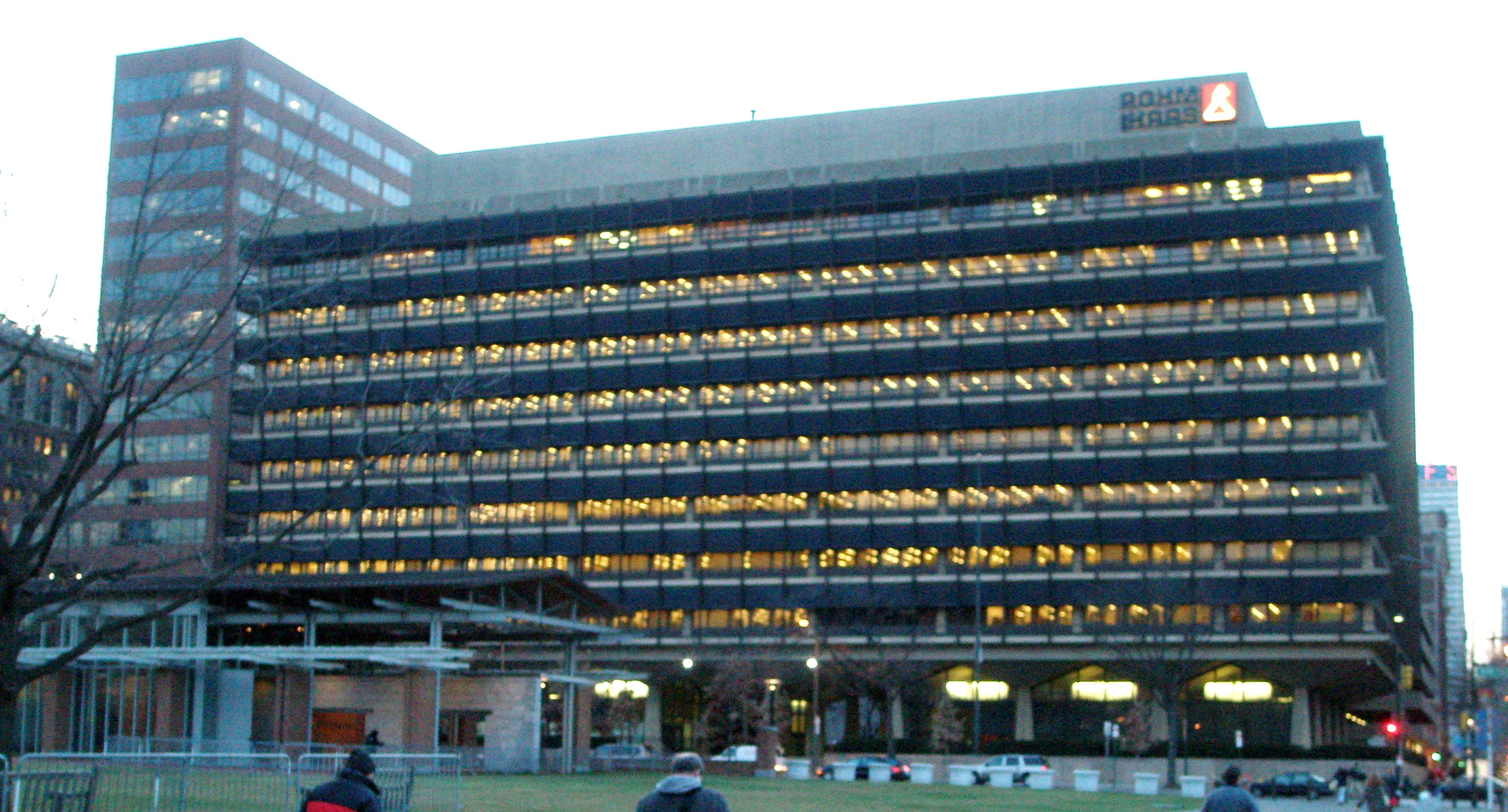
Headquarters at dusk, 2007

By the 2000s, the Rohm and Haas Corporate Headquarters needed upgrades to its building systems and facilities. The company spent two years deciding whether to renovate its current building or to move to cheaper, more modern space in Center City. In 2006 Rohm and Haas decided to stay in the current building and spend up to US$25 million on renovations. The building's architecture and layout were the main reason for the company to stay. The building allows single departments to stay together on the same floor, while in a Center City skyscraper departments would likely have to be spread out over several floors.

RMJM Hillier was hired to handle the building's renovations. The original plan was well received but exceeded the renovation's budget. To help pay for the renovations, RMJM Hillier tried to get the building declared a National Historic Landmark, which would allow the company to get tax credits. Usually buildings less than fifty years old are not considered, but the building's significance in Modern architecture kept the state of Pennsylvania and the National Park Service interested. While not designated a National Historic Landmark, the building was listed on the National Register of Historic Places on February 9, 2007.

To help get the Rohm and Haas Corporate Headquarters listed as a landmark, RMJM Hillier and Rohm and Haas focused renovations on opening up floor space and modernizing systems. A part of the original plan that altered the building's facade was abandoned, but the facade received a thorough cleaning. Inside, most of the enclosed office space was removed and replaced with open workstations. The new layout was also designed to let more light into the interior of the building. The work spaces also received new furniture, which replaced some that dated back to the 1960s. The dining area was moved from the basement to street level in a space that was previously occupied by a bank, but had lain vacant for several years. Security, telecommunications, and central plant systems were also upgraded and modernized. The interior renovations finished around May 2008, with improvements to the surrounding plaza completed several months later.

In 2009, Roh and Haas was acquired by the Dow Chemical Company and the logos on the exterior of the building were changed accordingly. Dow occupied the building until 2015, when the company announced it would be relocating its Philadelphia-based staff to Collegeville.

In 2018, Australian firm Macquarie Investment Management announced it would be moving into the building in 2020. In 2025, the U.S. arm of Macquarie was purchased by the Japanese company Nomura, which said it planned to make its new Philadelphia headquarters the hub of its international stock and bond funds business.

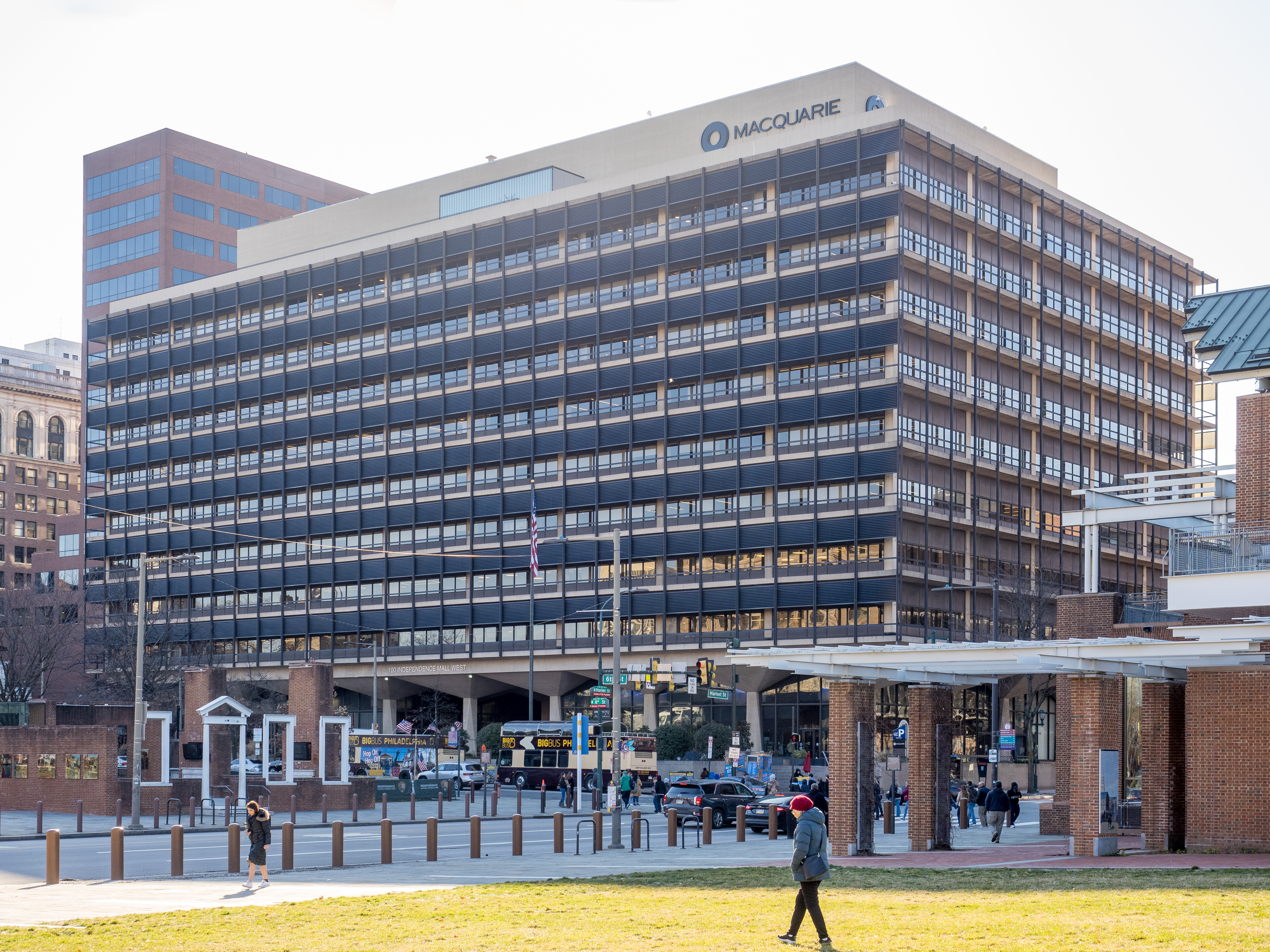
The building as it appeared in 2024 with the black Macquarie Group logo.

== Building ==
Starting from George M. Ewing's original design of an office tower, Pietro Belluschi and George M. Ewing Co. turned the Rohm and Haas Corporate Headquarters into a 300,000-square-foot (28,000 m^{2}), nine-story low horizontal block. At the corner of 6th Street and Market Street, two blocks away from Independence Hall, the Rohm and Haas Corporate Headquarters front facade runs parallel along 6th Street looking towards the Independence Mall. The reinforced concrete framed building sits on flaring concrete columns and is set back from the street by a raised plaza. The landscaped plaza cuts through the middle of the ground level of the building, opening up to a larger plaza with a fountain and small pool. The plaza behind the building allows public access to an alley that leads to Seventh Street.

To help keep the building cool, Belluschi added bronze-colored translucent corrugated panel sunscreens to the facade. Supported by a bronze anodized aluminum lattice, the sunscreens are made of Rohm and Haas's principal product, Plexiglas. The use of sunscreens and dark colors gave the facade a textured pattern and overall effect of avoiding making the building appear oversized. Besides the sunscreens, Plexiglas was used in the board room, in a few of the artistic commissions and light fixtures by designer György Kepes.

The building was very well received by Philadelphia's city planners, who felt it set a standard for redevelopment buildings. The building was designed to contrast, but not overwhelm the nearby 18th-century Georgian architecture. The Washington Post architecture critic Wolf Von Eckardt praised the building for its sensitivity to the nearby historic buildings, and how it related to the texture and small size of Independence Hall and at the same time the large open space of Independence Mall. The Corporate Headquarters has also been praised for its logical configuration, the building being described as "a very well done rational office building." Today the Rohm and Haas Corporate Headquarters is considered one of the best examples of the International style.
