= Commonwealth Building (Portland, Oregon) =

Historic building in Portland, Oregon, U.S.

- Equitable Building
- U.S. National Register of Historic Places
- Portland Historic Landmark
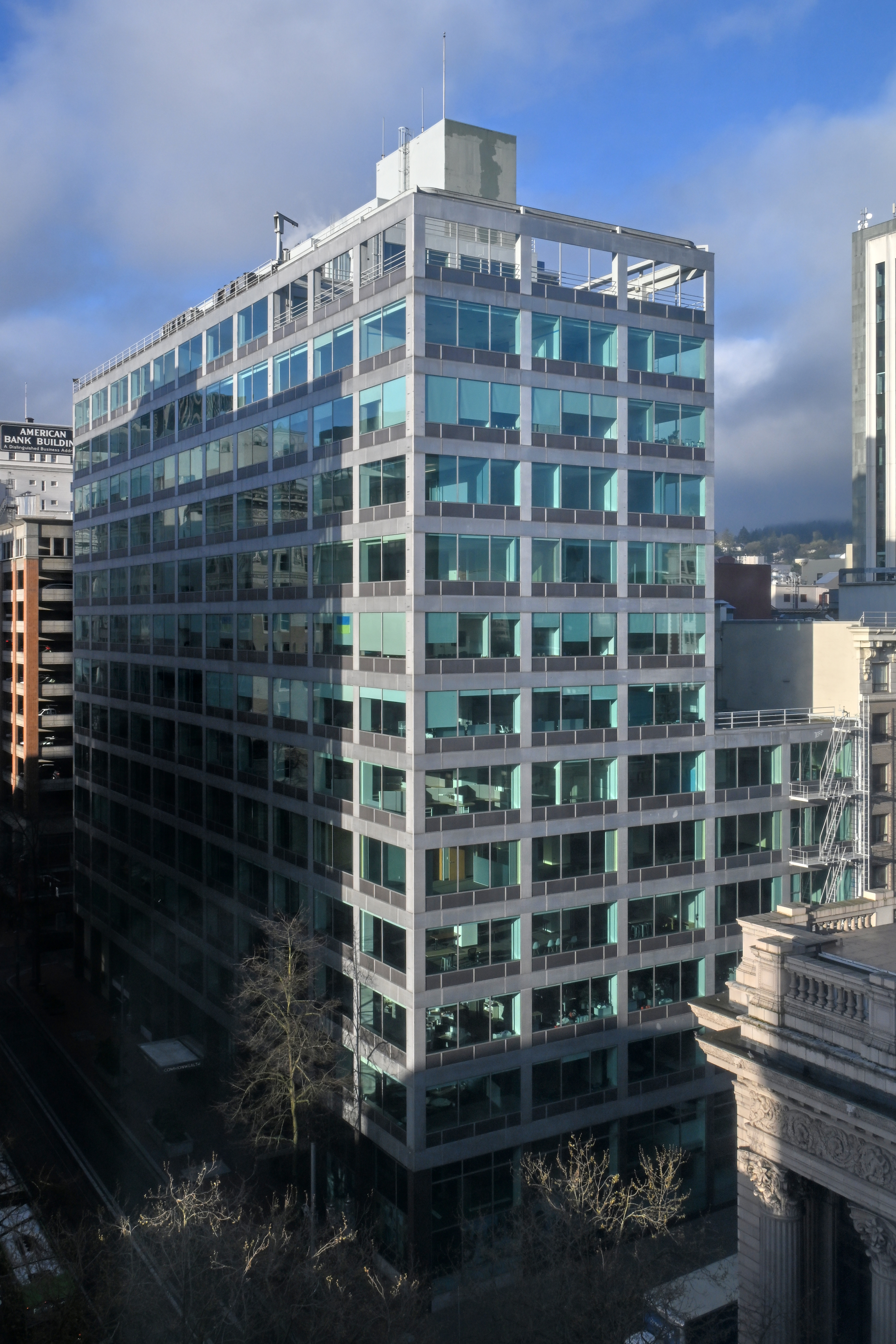
- Commonwealth (Equitable) Building in 2025.

- Location within Portland, Oregon
- Location: 421 SW 6th Avenue; Portland, Oregon
- Coordinates: 45°31′15″N 122°40′41″W
- Built: 1948; 78 years ago
- Architect: Pietro Belluschi
- Architectural style: International Style
- NRHP reference No.: 76001584
- Added to NRHP: March 30, 1976

The Commonwealth Building is a 14-story, 194 ft (59 m) commercial office tower in Portland, Oregon, United States. Located at 421 SW 6th Avenue between Washington and Harvey Milk Streets, it was designed by architect Pietro Belluschi and built between 1944 and 1948. The building was originally known as the Equitable Building and is noted as one of the first glass box towers ever built, pioneering many modern features and predating the more famous Lever House in New York City.

== History ==
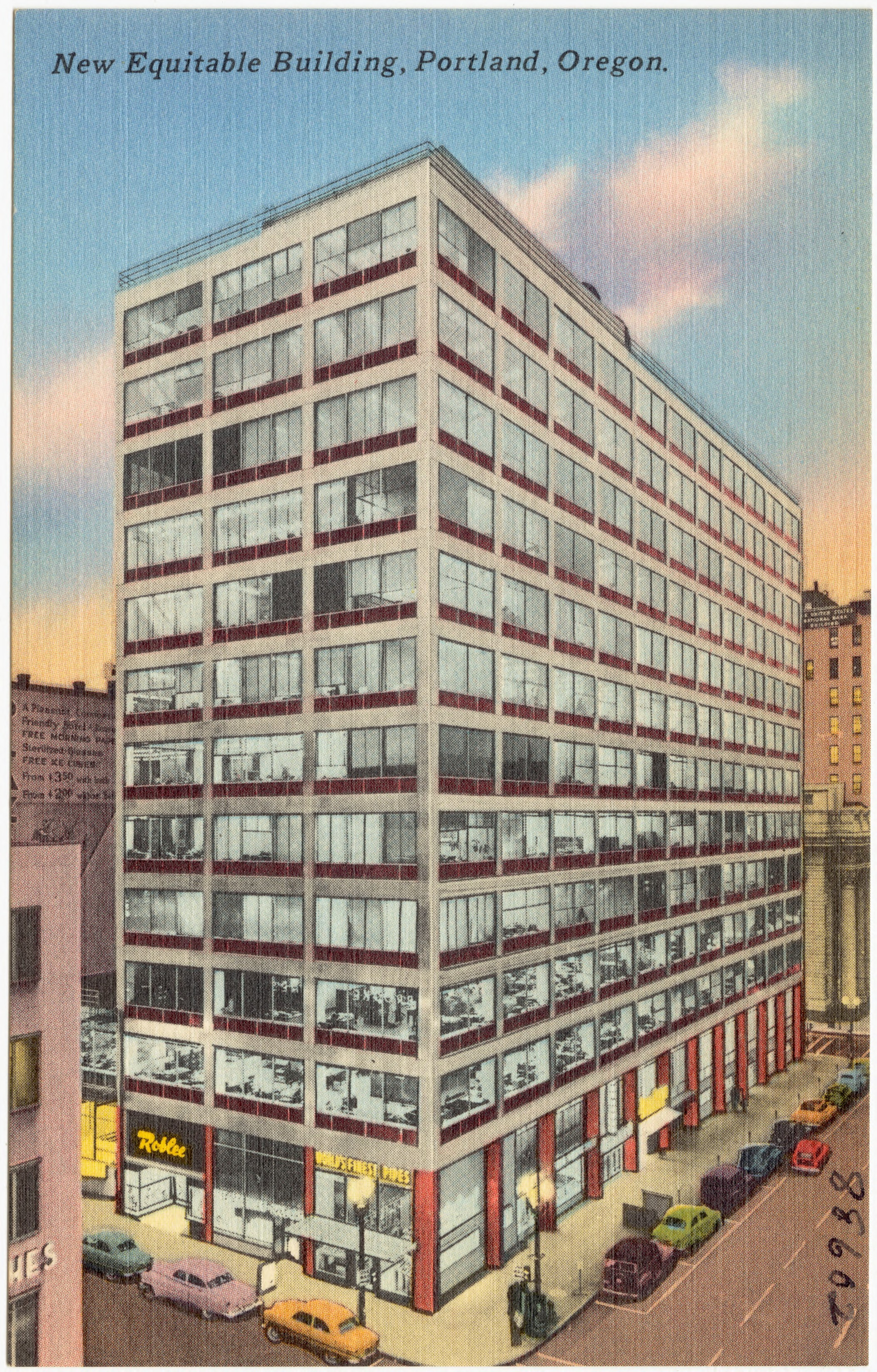
1940s postcard of the building

Construction on the building began in 1944, with it opening in 1948 as the Equitable Building. The building, which was built as the headquarters in Portland of the Equitable Savings and Loan Association, was originally intended to be 12 stories high but was later expanded to 14. It was the first tower to be sheathed in aluminum, the first to use double-glazed window panels, and was the first to be completely sealed and fully air-conditioned. In 1965, the building was renamed as the Commonwealth Building when the Equitable Center (now Unitus Plaza) opened, which was also designed by Pietro Belluschi.

The Commonwealth Building was added to the National Register of Historic Places (as the Equitable Building) in 1976. In 1980, the American Society of Mechanical Engineers (ASME) designated the Commonwealth Building as a National Historic Mechanical Engineering Landmark. In 1982, the building was the recipient of the Twenty-five Year Award, of the American Institute of Architects. In 1993, Weston Investment Co. LLC bought the building for $1.9 million. Unico Properties and Cigna Realty Investors bought the building in 2007 from Weston for $27 million, and spent $7 million more on renovations to the structure. The building was sold again by Unico in 2013 for $41 million when Unico bought out Cigna. Unico sold the tower to KBS in 2016 for $69 million. Commonwealth Property Owner LLC took possession on a $15,000,000 trust deed in July 2023, who then sold it for $6.5 million in December 2025.

== Features ==
Designed by noted Oregon architect Pietro Belluschi, the 207,864-square-foot (19,311.2 m^{2}) tower is of the International Style. The 14-story, 194 ft (59 m)-tall glass box tower is constructed of sea-green glass and is sheathed in aluminum.

== Designations and awards ==
The building is listed on the National Register of Historic Places, and is also designated as a National Historic Mechanical Engineering Landmark by the ASME. The ASME History & Heritage Committee bestowed this landmark status for the specific feature: the first large commercial building in the United States to pioneer the use of heat pumps for heating and cooling.

== See also ==
- Architecture of Portland, Oregon
- 400 SW Sixth Avenue
- National Register of Historic Places listings in South and Southwest Portland, Oregon
