= Rohm and Haas =

Company

Rohm and Haas Company
- Type: Subsidiary
- Industry: Chemical manufacturing
- Founded: September 1, 1909; 117 years ago
- Headquarters: Philadelphia, Pennsylvania, U.S.
- Parent: Dow Chemical Company
- Website: rohmhaas.com

Rohm and Haas Company is a US manufacturer of specialty chemicals for end use markets such as building and construction, electronic devices, packaging, household and personal care products. Headquartered in Philadelphia, the company is organized into three business groups of Specialty Materials, Performance Materials and Electronic Materials, and also has two stand-alone businesses of Powder Coatings and Salt. Formerly a Fortune 500 Company, Rohm and Haas employs more than 17,000 people in 27 countries, with its last sales revenue reported as an independent company at US$8.9 billion. Dow Chemical Company bought Rohm and Haas for $15 billion in 2009.

== History ==
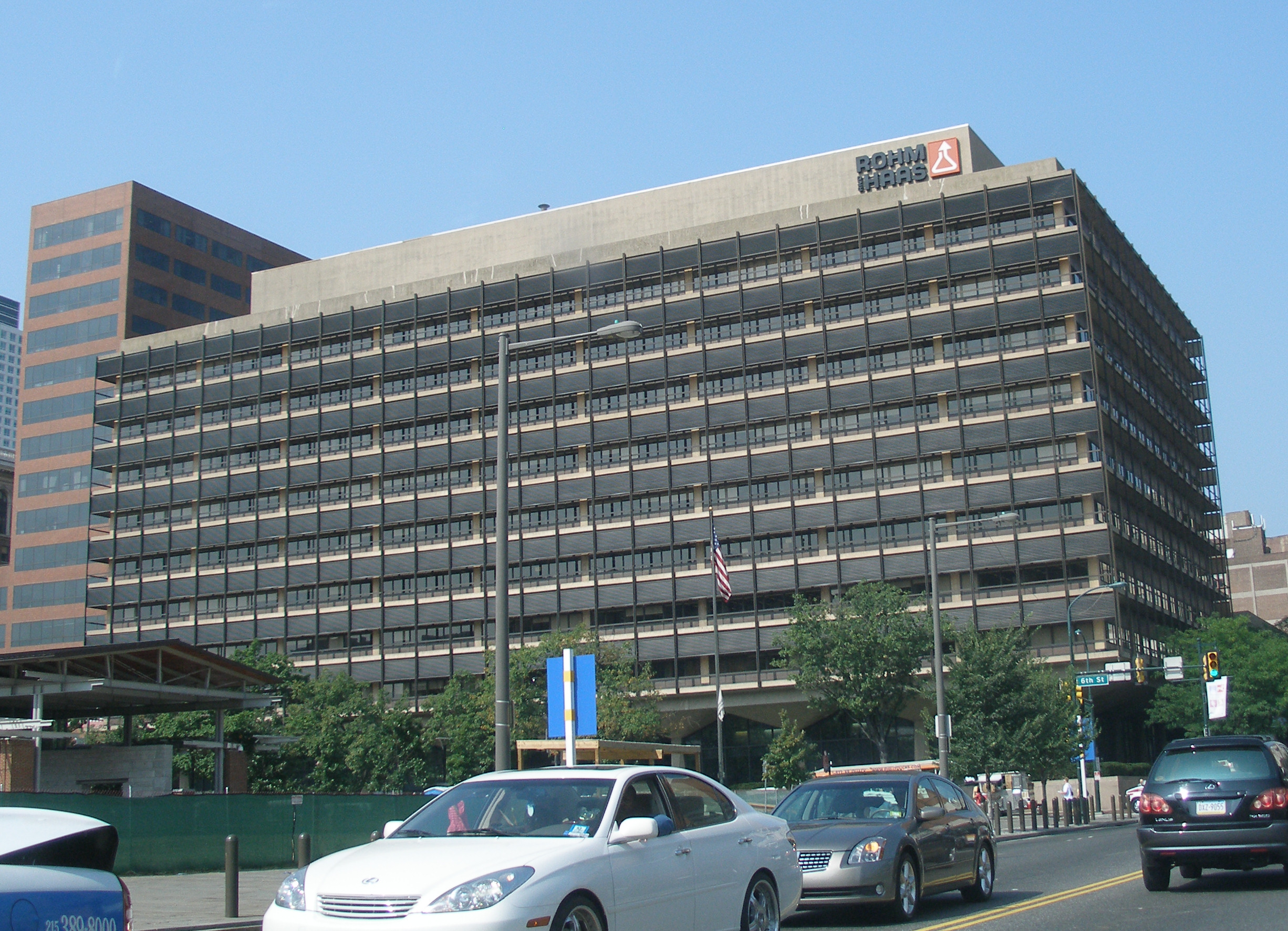
Rohm and Haas Corporate Headquarters in Philadelphia, 2007

The company was founded in Esslingen, Germany, by Dr. Otto Röhm and Mr. Otto Haas in 1907. Haas moved to Philadelphia and began the American side of the business on September 1, 1909, from an office on Front Street, while Otto Röhm remained in Germany to run a company that would eventually become Röhm GmbH. Röhm improved the unhygienic working conditions in tanneries by replacing dog feces as a leather mordant with enzymes harvested from the pancreas of slaughtered animals. Leather factories soon started buying the new product, Oropon. The American company grew rapidly as World War I approached as leather was needed in large quantities for belts and saddles.

The company again grew rapidly as World War II approached, as it manufactured Plexiglas acrylic, a transparent plastic which was needed for aircraft canopies. They sold this part of the business in 1998 to Elf Atochem (now Arkema).

In 1965 Rohm and Haas moved its headquarters from Washington Square to a new building on Independence Mall a few blocks away. The new Rohm and Haas Corporate Headquarters was designed by Pietro Belluschi and George M. Ewing Co. (now EwingCole).

In 1999 Rohm and Haas acquired the Morton Salt company.

The main products of Rohm and Haas are specialty materials with advanced chemistry that allows end-use products to have a particular characteristic, e.g., low-odor, water-based paints, sunscreens with greater SPF functionality, or more powerful semiconductor chips.

On July 10, 2008 Rohm and Haas announced it was being bought by Dow Chemical Company for US$18.8 billion. Rohm and Haas will continue doing business under its name and will remain in its Philadelphia headquarters. Dow Chemical tried to back out of acquiring Rohm and Haas when a deal to form a joint venture with Kuwait Petroleum that would give Dow money to buy Rohm and Haas failed. On 2 April 2009, it was reported that Morton Salt was being acquired by German fertilizer and salt company K+S for a total enterprise value of US$1.7bn. The sale, completed by October 2009, was in conjunction with the Dow Chemical Company's takeover of Rohm and Haas.

Dow announced their intent to sell the Rohm and Haas Powder Division.

Rohm and Haas attracted national headlines in 1985 as an example of the Internal Revenue Service's ineptitude after the company received an IRS demand for a $46,807.37 penalty because of a 10-cent discrepancy in the reporting of payroll taxes for 1983. Over a course of five months, the company spent many hours trying to explain their case to the IRS, tasked five accountants to investigate and wrote seven letters to the agency before the penalty was finally dropped.

== Environmental record ==
On July 6, 2004, the Environmental Protection Agency charged Rohm and Haas with violating the Clean Air Act after inspecting its facility in Louisville, Kentucky. The Agency claimed that the company failed to repair a deteriorated chemical storage tank, failed to maintain a complete list of monitoring regulations, and failed to remove accumulated hazardous wastes.

On February 12, 2006, eleven workers were hospitalized after being exposed to fumes that leaked out of the Rohm and Haas Corporation chemical plant in Cincinnati, Ohio. On February 15, 2006, an employee died when working on a steam ejector due to the inhalation of hydrogen sulfide gas. An investigation determined that since the sewer vent was plugged, the hydrogen sulfide gas accumulated into large concentrations that became lethal.

On April 25, 2006, Rohm and Haas, and other defendants, were sued in Philadelphia for failing to prevent toxic spills, to employ adequate groundwater practices, and to warn residents of any potential presence of underground contamination. This led to 18 filed cases of brain tumors and cancers among local residents of McCullom Lake, Illinois.

As early as 1980, the company's Ringwood, Illinois factory located in McHenry County, Illinois, underwent investigation for contamination of the town's groundwater. Studies, paid for by Rohm and Haas, showed the groundwater never affected the town's well water. The company is now one of five corporations undergoing a class-action lawsuit filed by the town's residents, claiming a direct correlation to 34 out of 1,074 residents experiencing some type of brain or pituitary gland cancer. The Northwest Herald published a six-piece investigative story on the lawsuits and residents, claiming to reveal a blatant "mishandling" of the entire affair on the part of local health officials and Rohm and Haas.

== Labor relations ==
=== Deer Park ===
In 1969, union members with the Oil, Chemical, & Atomic Workers went on strike at the Rohm and Haas Deer Park facility in Harris County, Texas.

In 2010, following the purchase of Rohm and Haas by Dow, Dow attempted to fire around 60 union workers and replace them with contract workers in order to lower labor expenses. Dow also wanted to end annual raises and threatened to stop pay and benefits if workers walked out. The United Steel Workers threatened a strike, but ultimately a strike was averted after a new four-year deal with Dow was negotiated. At the time, 325 of the plant's 620 workers were represented by USW.

On July 17, 2012, Brian Johns, a worker at the Deer Park facility, was injured in an explosion, and later died. The firm paid a $23,000 fine for the incident.

In April 2019, following weeks of negotiations with the United Steel Workers and two rejected contracts, Rohm and Haas locked out almost 230 members of the union. A lockout is the company equivalent of a strike. This has led to daily pickets by union members. Dow states that the plant continues to run in a safe manner by salaried workers at the plant. The negotiations are in regards to safety, excessive overtime, and arbitration.

== See also ==
- Anidex
- Monsanto Co. v. Rohm and Haas Co.
- List of companies based in the Philadelphia area
- Front brake light; proposed front braking lights in concept cars Explorer IV (1967) and V (1969)
