= First Presbyterian Church (Cottage Grove, Oregon) =

Historic church in the United States

- U.S. National Register of Historic Places
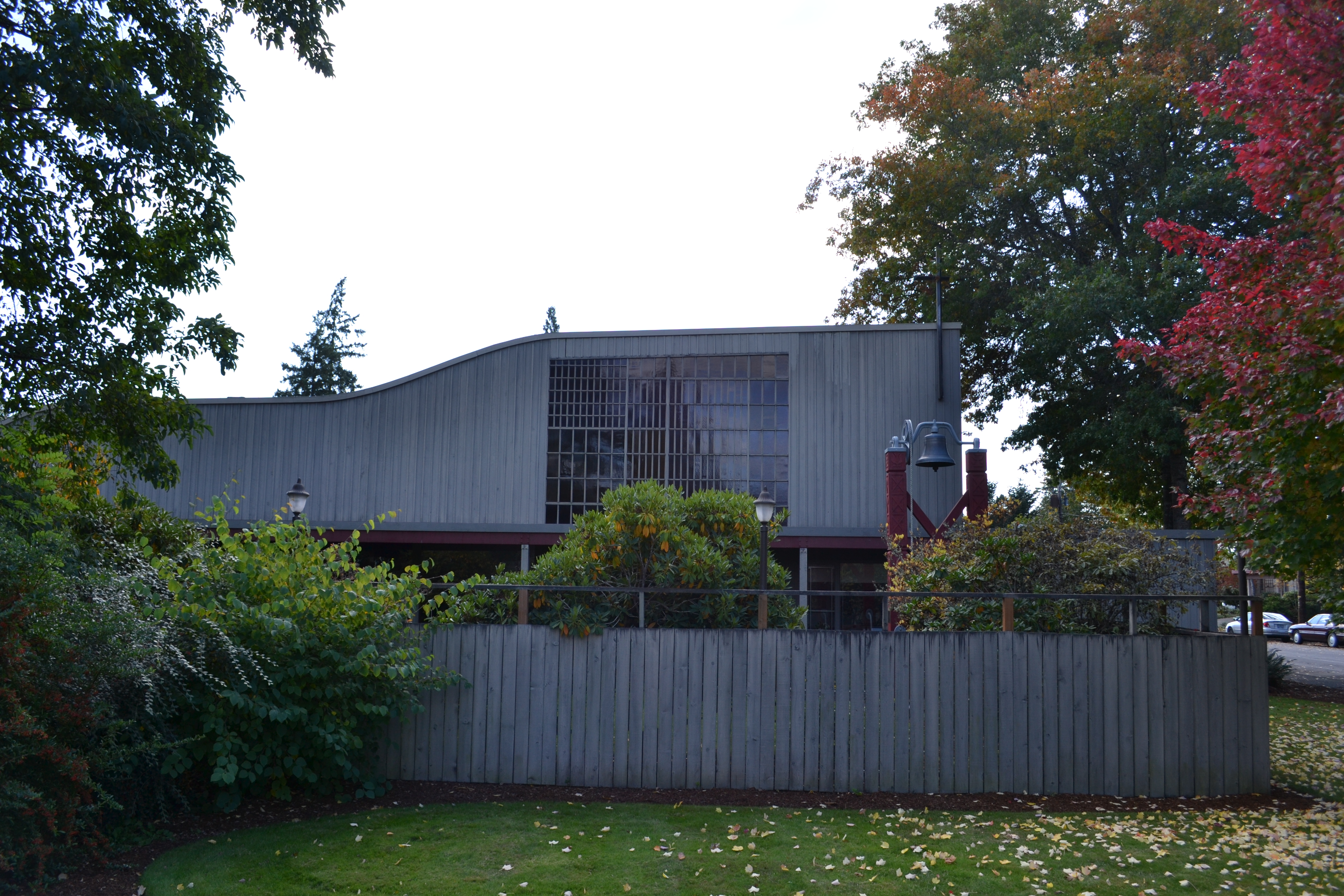

- Location within Oregon Location within the United States
- Location: 216 S. 3rd St., Cottage Grove, Oregon
- Coordinates: 43°47′42″N 123°3′48″W
- Area: 1 acre (0.40 ha)
- Built: 1951
- Architect: Pietro Belluschi
- Architectural style: Pacific Northwest
- NRHP reference No.: 74001690
- Added to NRHP: December 31, 1974

The First Presbyterian Church is located in Cottage Grove, Oregon, United States. It is listed on the National Register of Historic Places (NRHP).

== Description and history ==
The structure was designed by Italian-born architect Pietro Belluschi in what came to be known as Pacific Northwest architecture style during 1948-51 and was built in 1951. It was listed on the NRHP in 1974; the listing included one contributing building and one other contributing structure.

Its NRHP nomination quoted Marion Ross as saying "'The First Presbyterian Church in Cottage Grove, finished in 1951, is the least traditional and probably the best of Belluschi's Oregon churches. The material is all wood, and while there is no obvious suggestion of the forms of vernacular building, there can be no doubt that it is suitable for the small community in which it is sited. It would seem that in this design Belluschi had become so imbued with the spirit of the region that no obvious similarity of shape was necessary to give it the feeling of belonging."'

== See also ==
- National Register of Historic Places listings in Lane County, Oregon
