= Anidex =

Synthetic, stretchable fiber

Anidex is one of the elastomeric synthetic fibers. It is made from an artificial linear polymer consisting of at least 50% by mass of one or more monohydric alcohol esters.

== Development ==
Rohm and Haas developed Anidex in 1969. The company could not produce it commercially because of lacking differences in properties to become an economic success.

== Properties ==
Anidex is a stretchable fiber with good elasticity and recovery, but it was lesser than its counterparts, for instance, spandex. Anidex has good resistance to chemicals, sunlight, and heat, which was better than spandex and rubber. The fiber was possible to blend with many natural and synthetic fibers. It is easy to handle and care for.

== Application ==
Because of its stretching properties It is a useful fiber for textiles. The fiber provides extra elasticity to the blends and makes them more functional, and aids in designing such as upholstery material fits better to the furniture.

== See also ==
- Acrylic fiber
- Spandex
