= Downhole heat exchanger =

Type of heat exchanger

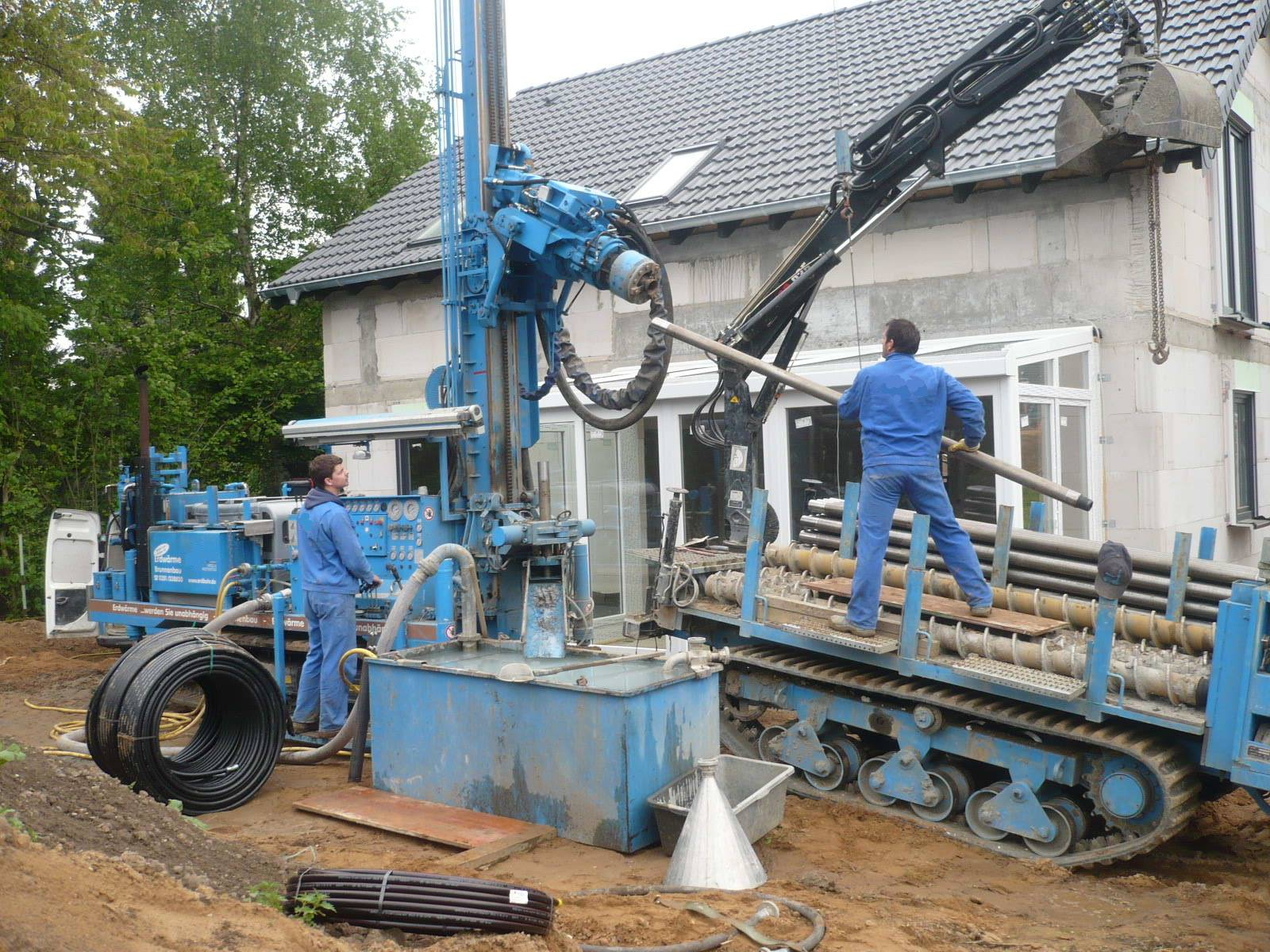
Drilling process for a downhole heat exchanger. Furled tube in the foreground on the left.

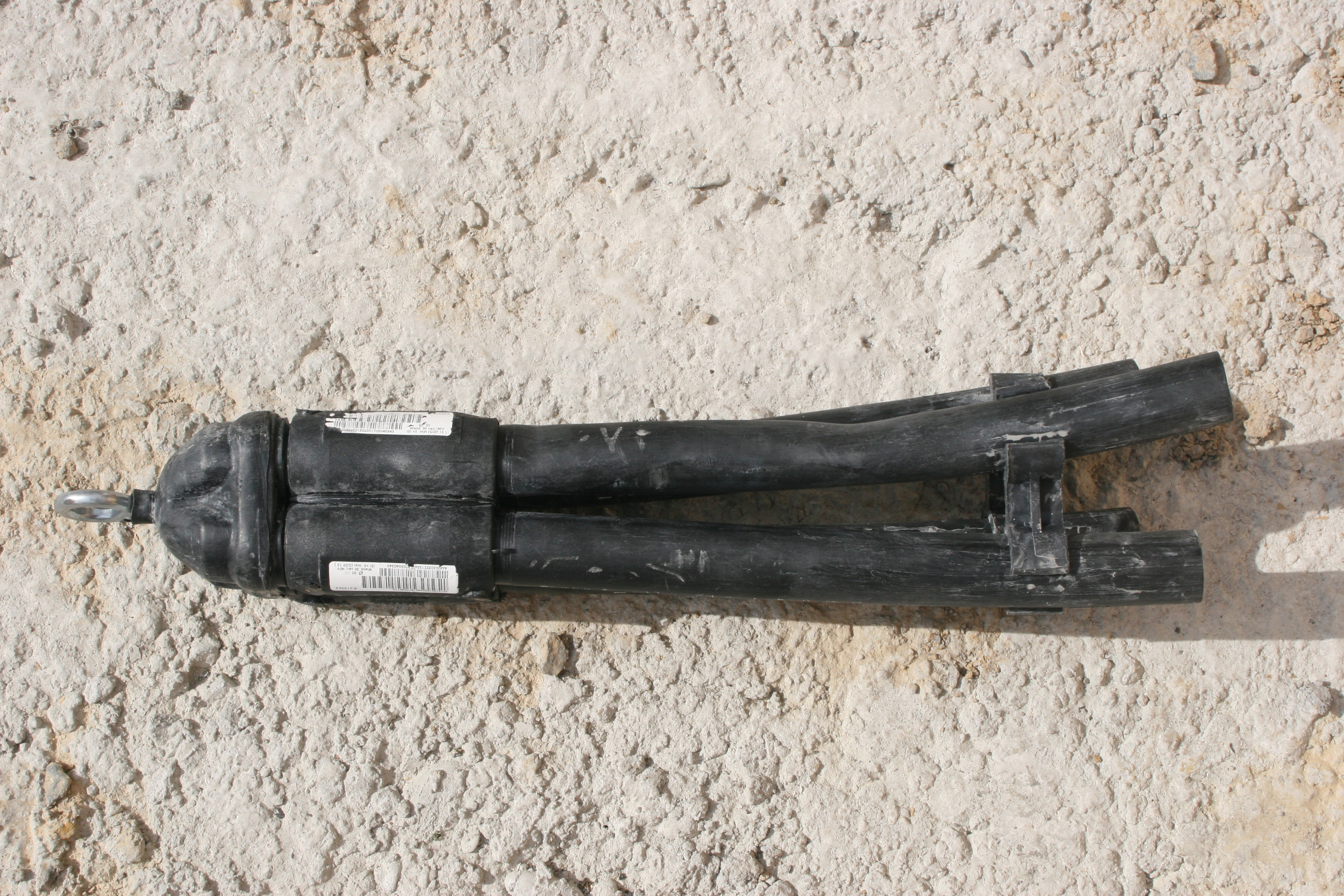
Bottom end of a downhole heat exchanger

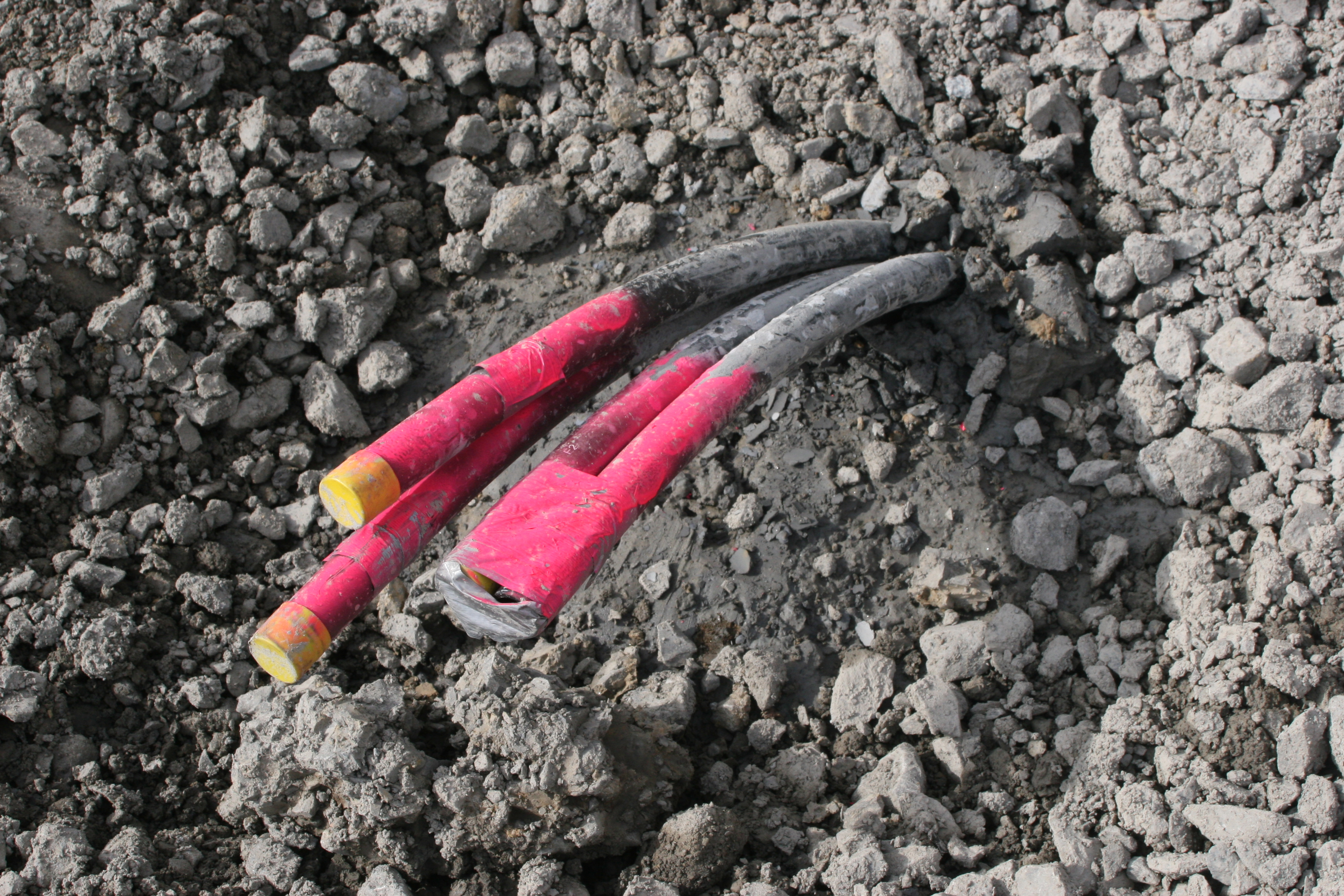
Top end of a downhole heat exchanger

A downhole heat exchanger (DHE), also called a borehole heat exchanger (BHE), is a heat exchanger installed inside a vertical or inclined borehole. It is used to capture or dissipate heat to or from the ground. DHTs are used for geothermal heating, sometimes with the help of a geothermal heat pump. Downhole heat exchangers, like other use of geothermal energy, have the potential to significantly contribute to the reduction of CO_{2} emissions. In northern Europe, DHE are already widely deployed.

== Types ==
=== U-tube ===
The heat exchanger usually consists of one or two u-tubes through which the carrier fluid, usually water, circulates. The space around the u-tubes is filled with groundwater or backfilled with thermally conductive grout.

=== Open pipe ===
Another design uses a single open pipe to flow water downward. The water then returns through the annular gap between the pipe and the casing. This design provides better thermal contact than u-tubes, but risks contamination by groundwater. Since this involves practically no downhole equipment, these systems usually only go by the name of borehole heat exchangers (BHT).

=== Standing column well ===
If no casing is installed and groundwater is permitted to charge the system, this arrangement is no longer a BHT, but rather a standing column well.
