= Unitus Plaza =

Building in Oregon, United States

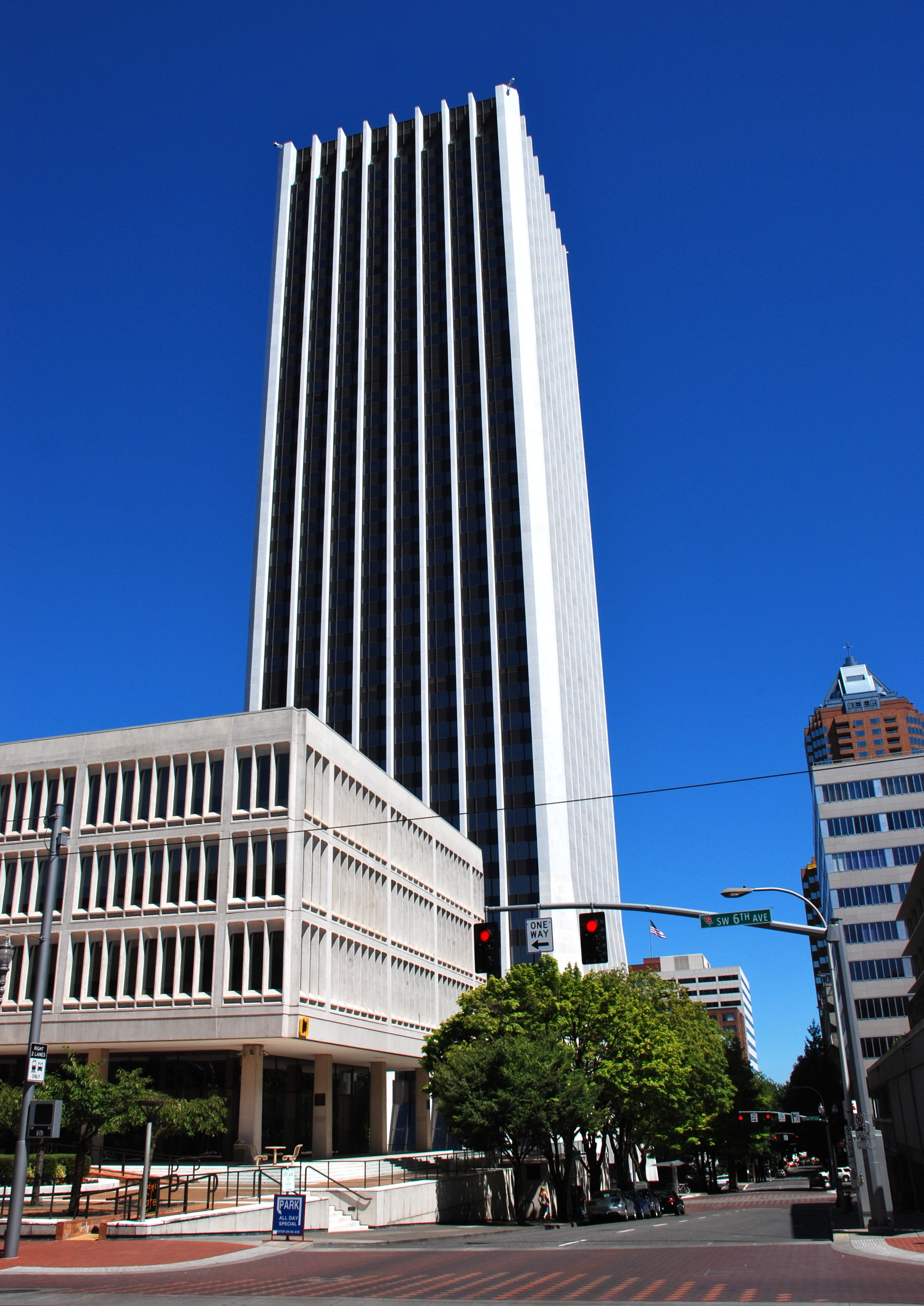
- Unitus Plaza in the lower left
- Interactive map of the Unitus Plaza area
- Former names: Hoffman Columbia Plaza

General information
- Location: Portland, Oregon, United States
- Coordinates: 45°30′53″N 122°40′50″W

Unitus Plaza (formerly Hoffman Columbia Plaza) is a building at 1300 SW 6th Avenue in Portland, Oregon. The structure was purchased by Menashe Properties in 2018.
