= List of tallest buildings in Portland, Oregon =

Skyline of Portland
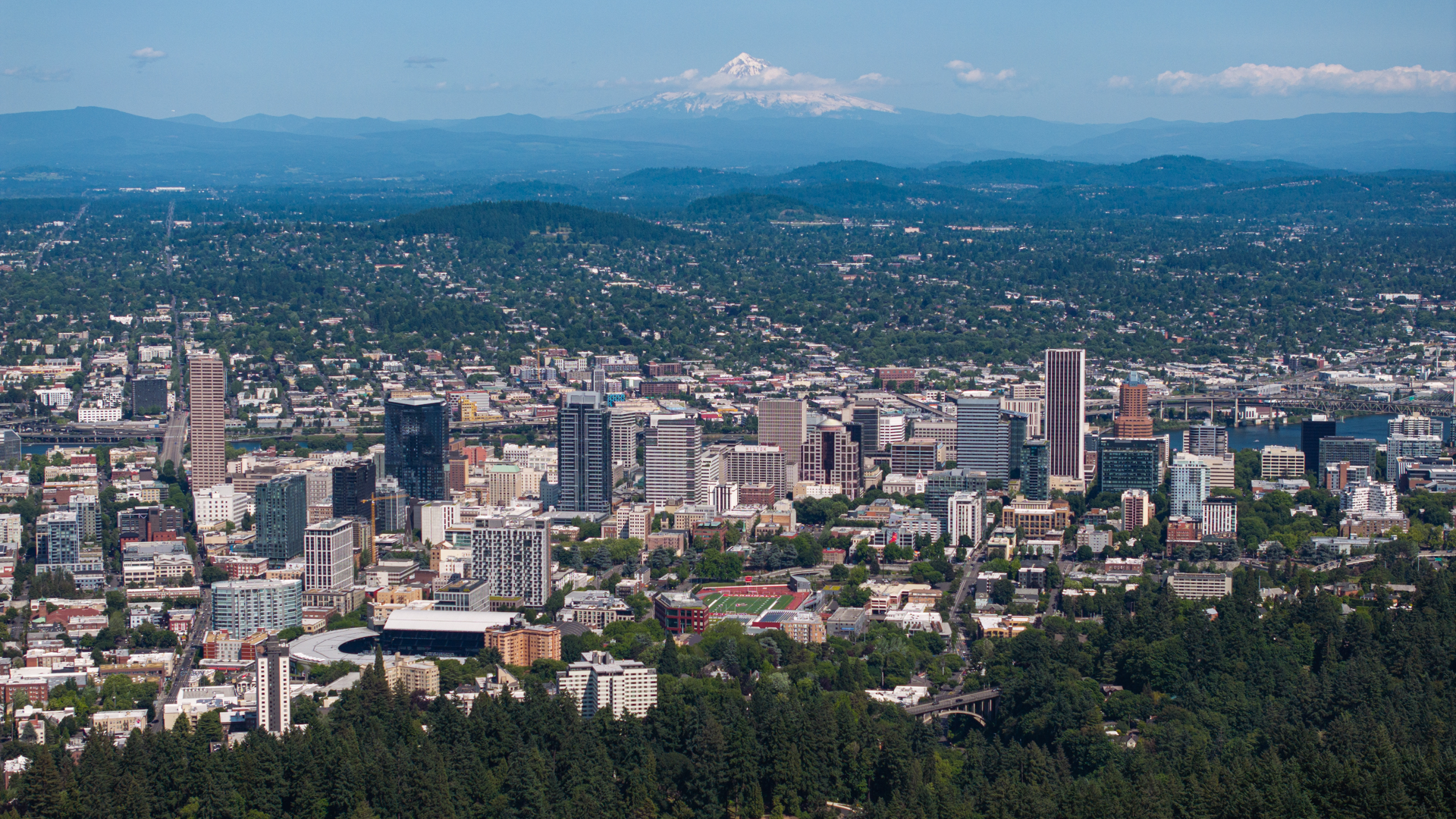
- Downtown Portland in 2025
- Tallest building: Wells Fargo Center (1973)
- Tallest building height: 546 ft (166.4 m)
- Major clusters: Downtown Portland; South Waterfront; Lloyd District
- First 150 m+ building: Wells Fargo Center

Number of tall buildings (2026)
- Taller than 100 m (328 ft): 10
- Taller than 150 m (492 ft): 4

Number of tall buildings — feet
- Taller than 200 ft (61.0 m): 73
- Taller than 300 ft (91.4 m): 17

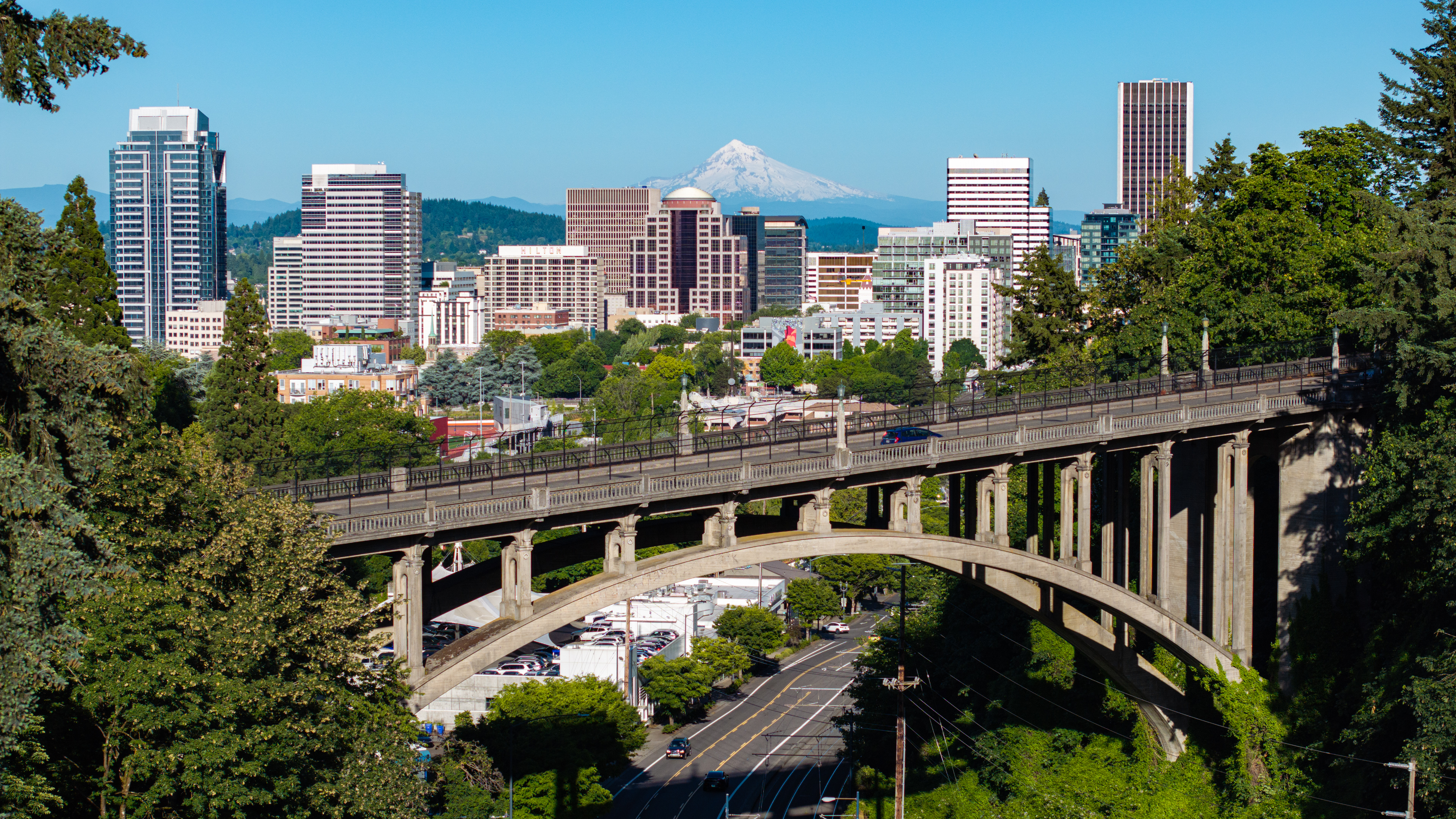
Portland's skyline behind the Vista Bridge

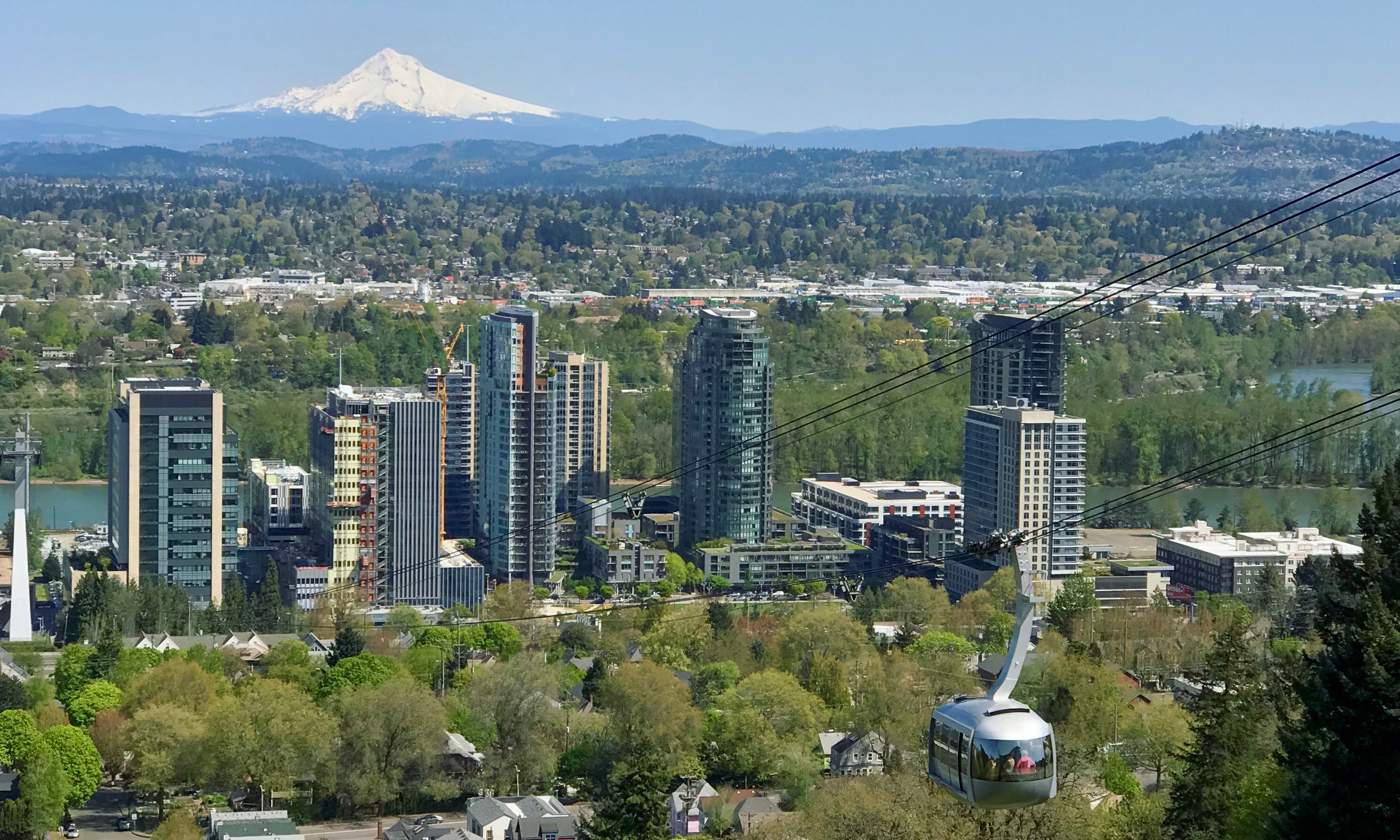
The South Waterfront neighborhood alongside the Portland Aerial Tram

Portland, the largest city in the U.S. state of Oregon, is the site of 73 completed high-rises with a height of 200 feet (61 m) or greater as of 2026, four of which stand taller than 492 feet (150 m). The tallest building in Portland is the Wells Fargo Center, a 40-story office skyscraper that rises 546 ft (166 m) in Downtown Portland and was completed in 1972. The second tallest skyscraper in the city is the U.S. Bancorp Tower, which rises 536 feet (163 m) and was built in 1983. Portland is home to most of the tallest buildings in Oregon. Ranked by the number of buildings taller than 492 ft (150 m), Portland has the second largest skyline in the Northwestern United States, after Seattle, which has 22.

The history of skyscrapers in Portland is thought to have begun with the construction of the 12-story, 182 ft (55 m) Wells Fargo Building in 1907, regarded as Portland's first high-rise. However, The Oregonian Building remained the city's tallest building due to its 194 ft (59 m) clock tower until 1913, upon the construction of the 207 ft (61 m) American Bank Building. Portland's skyline grew modestly in the early 20th century, mainly around Pioneer Courthouse Square in downtown, such as with the Italianate style Public Service Building in 1927 and the Meier & Frank Building in 1932. The Commonwealth Building, completed in 1948, is considered one of the earliest modernist buildings. From the 1960s to 1980s, a major building boom took place in Portland, which saw the expansion of the downtown skyline, including the completion of the city's three tallest buildings. Following the opening of the Lloyd Center mall in 1960, several office high-rises were constructed in the surrounding Lloyd District.

The pace of high-rise construction declined between the mid-1980s and late 1990s. Portland's skyline has continued to grow in the early 21st century, with an increased share of residential and mixed-use developments. Park Avenue West, completed in 2016 at a height of 502 ft (153 ft), is the city's fourth tallest skyscraper. Block 216, Portland's fifth-tallest building, was completed in 2023. The Pearl District witnessed a construction boom during this period, with residential high-rises such as Cosmopolitan on the Park. South Waterfront, the city's largest urban redevelopment project, was built in phases beginning in 2004. The district has over ten high-rises, two of which are part of the OHSU Center for Health & Healing.

Portland's high-rises can be found on both sides of the Willamette River, which flows through the city. The city's tallest skyscrapers are concentrated in Downtown Portland, which is bounded by Interstate 405 to the west and the Willamette River to the east. The Pearl District is immediately north of downtown, with its tallest buildings on the area's northernmost end. South Waterfront is south of downtown, directly south of the Ross Island Bridge, and has ten buildings taller than 200 ft (61 m). East of the river and northeast of downtown is the Lloyd District, which has five buildings taller than that height. A general height limits the heights of most developments in Portland to below 460 ft (140 m), with lower height restrictions in the Old Town and Pearl District neighborhoods. Portland's skyline can be viewed alongside Mount Hood from the elevated West Hills, including from Pittock Mansion.

== History ==
Number of buildings by height in Portland by the end of each year, based on the information in this article. Click on the legend to toggle a specific height on or off. View chart definition.

== Cityscape ==
Skyline of Portland from Pittock Mansion in 2019

== Map of tallest buildings ==
This map shows the location of every building taller than 200 ft (61 m) in Portland. Each marker is numbered by the building's height rank, and colored by the decade of its completion.

Buildings taller than 200 ft (61 m) in Portland.
- 1950s and before
- 1960s
- 1970s
- 1980s
- 1990s
- 2000s
- 2010s
- 2020s
1 Wells Fargo Center
2 U.S. Bancorp Tower
3 KOIN Tower
4 Park Avenue West
5 Block 216
6 PacWest Center
7 Fox Tower
8 Standard Insurance Center
9 Edith Green – Wendell Wyatt Federal Building
10 Cosmopolitan on the Park
11 John Ross Tower
12 The Ardea
13 Mirabella Portland
14 Multnomah County Central Courthouse
15 1000 Broadway
16 Mark O. Hatfield United States Courthouse
17 Moda Tower
18 Congress Center
19 Lloyd Center Tower
20 Eleven West
21 Twelve West
22 NV
23 OnPoint Plaza
24 Atwater Place
25 Portland Plaza
26 Umpqua Bank Plaza
27 Multnomah County Justice Center
28 OHSU Center for Health & Healing, Building 1
29 The Meriwether West
30 Broadway Tower
31 200 Market
32 Lloyd 700
33 One Main Place
34 Benson Tower
35 Aster Tower
36 Willamette Tower
37 Byline Apartments
38 Grant Tower
39 Bank of America Center
40 Liberty Centre
41 Vista North Pearl
42 OHSU Center for Health & Healing, Building 2
43 Harrison West
44 Kaiser Permanente Building
45 Hilton Portland Hotel
46 Ladd Tower
47 The Meriweather East
48 Pioneer Tower
49 Harrison Tower Apartments & Villas
50 The Bidwell Marriott Portland
51 Portland Building
52 World Trade Center
53 Riva on the Park
54 Metropolitan Condos
55 Alta ART Tower
56 Commonwealth Building
57 Harrison East
58 Standard Plaza
59 Pacific First Center
60 735 St. Clair
61 Public Service Building
62 Eliot Tower
63 Portland Astoria
64 The Duniway Portland
65 5 MLK
66 Madison Tower
67 First & Main
68 The Watermark at the Pearl
69 Meier & Frank Building
70 Dossier Hotel
71 Yard
72 American Bank Building
73 Joseph R. Robertson Collaborative Life Sciences Building

== Tallest buildings ==
This list ranks completed buildings in Portland that stand at least 200 ft (61 m) tall as of 2026, based on standard height measurement. This includes spires and architectural details but does not include antenna masts. The “Year” column indicates the year of completion. Buildings tied in height are sorted by year of completion with earlier buildings ranked first, and then alphabetically.

Was the tallest building in Portland upon completion

Rank	Name	Image	Location	Height ft (m)	Floors	Year	Purpose	Notes
1	Wells Fargo Center		45°30′52″N 122°40′46″W	546 (166.4)	40	1973	Office	Tallest building in Portland and Oregon since 1973. Originally named the First National Bank Tower upon completion until 1980, when it was changed to First Interstate Tower. The current name was adopted after Wells Fargo purchased First Interstate in 1996. Tallest building completed in Portland in the 1970s.
2	U.S. Bancorp Tower		45°31′22″N 122°40′33″W	536 (163.4)	42	1983	Office	Tallest building completed in Portland in the 1980s. Also known as "Big Pink" due to the color of its granite exterior.
3	KOIN Tower		45°30′47″N 122°40′39″W	509 (155.2)	31	1984	Mixed-use	Mixed-use office and residential building. Tallest mixed-use building in Portland.
4	Park Avenue West		45°31′10″N 122°40′52″W	502 (153)	30	2016	Mixed-use	Tallest building completed in Portland in the 2010s. Mixed-use office and residential building. Also known as the Moyer Tower. The Skyscraper Center lists a height of 537 ft (163.7 m), although other sources state a height of 502 ft (153 m).
5	Block 216		45°31′15″N 122°40′52″W	464 (141.4)	36	2023	Mixed-use	Construction started in July 2019. Tallest building completed in Portland in the 2020s. Mixed-use residential, hotel, and office building. The hotel is a Ritz-Carlton.
6	PacWest Center		45°30′55″N 122°40′48″W	418 (127.4)	30	1984	Office	
7	Fox Tower		45°31′07″N 122°40′51″W	372 (113.4)	27	2000	Office	Tallest building completed in Portland in the 2000s.
8	Standard Insurance Center		45°31′01″N 122°40′41″W	367 (111.9)	27	1970	Office	Tallest building in Portland from 1970 to 1973.
9	Edith Green – Wendell Wyatt Federal Building		45°30′52″N 122°40′37″W	361 (110)	18	1974	Office	Originally constructed at a height of 270 feet (82 m), the building's height was extended to its current height in 2013.
10	Cosmopolitan on the Park		45°31′54″N 122°40′56″W	340 (103.6)	28	2016	Residential	Tallest fully residential building in Portland.
11	John Ross Tower		45°29′49″N 122°40′12″W	325 (99.1)	32	2007	Residential	Built to the maximum allowable height in the South Waterfront area. Joint-tallest building in the South Waterfront area.
12	The Ardea		45°29′45″N 122°40′13″W	325 (99.1)	30	2008	Residential	Tallest multi-family rental residence in Portland. Built to the maximum allowable height in the South Waterfront area. Joint-tallest building in the South Waterfront area.
13	Mirabella Portland		45°29′51″N 122°40′13″W	325 (99.1)	30	2010	Residential	Built to the maximum allowable height in the South Waterfront area. Joint-tallest buildings in the South Waterfront area.
14	Multnomah County Central Courthouse		45°30′50″N 122°40′30″W	324 (98.8)	17	2020	Government	
15	1000 Broadway		45°31′01″N 122°40′50″W	320 (97.5)	24	1991	Office	
16	Mark O. Hatfield United States Courthouse		45°30′57″N 122°40′34″W	318 (96.9)	16	1997	Government	Tallest building completed in Portland in the 1990s.
17	Moda Tower		45°31′06″N 122°40′29″W	308 (93.9)	24	1999	Office	Formerly known as ODS Tower.
18	Congress Center		45°31′00″N 122°40′46″W	292 (89)	23	1980	Office	Formerly known as the Orbanco Building and Security Pacific Plaza.
19	Lloyd Center Tower		45°31′55″N 122°39′26″W	290 (88.4)	20	1981	Office	Tallest building in Portland outside of downtown.
20	Eleven West		45°31′18″N 122°40′59″W	290 (88)	24	2023	Mixed-use	Also stylized as 11W. Mixed-use residential and office building.
21	Twelve West		45°31′20″N 122°41′02″W	273 (83.2)	17	2009	Mixed-use	Mixed-use residential and office building. Also known as Indigo 12 West or Indigo Apartments.
22	NV		45°31′57″N 122°41′03″W	272 (82.9)	26	2016	Residential	
23	OnPoint Plaza		45°31′16″N 122°40′45″W	268 (81.7)	15	1969	Office	Briefly the tallest building in Portland from 1969 to 1970. Tallest building completed in Portland in the 1960s. Formerly known as the UnionBank Tower from 2008 to 2026, the Union Bank of California Tower from 1996 to 2008, and originally as the Bank of California building.
24	Atwater Place		45°29′48″N 122°40′08″W	268 (81.7)	23	2008	Residential	
25	Portland Plaza		45°30′47″N 122°40′49″W	267 (81.4)	25	1973	Residential	
26	Umpqua Bank Plaza		45°30′48″N 122°40′32″W	263 (80.2)	19	1974	Office	Originally named the Benjamin Franklin Plaza after tenant Benj. Franklin Savings and Loan. The building was later renamed after current tenant Umpqua Holdings Corporation.
27	Multnomah County Justice Center		45°30′54″N 122°40′36″W	263 (80) (Note: Sources do not state the exact height of this building. This figure was determined using Google Earth by subtracting the altitude of the building's lowest main pedestrian open-air entrance from its highest architectural point.)	18	1983	Government	
28	OHSU Center for Health & Healing, Building 1		45°29′56″N 122°40′17″W	260 (79.2)	16	2006	Health	
29	The Meriwether West		45°29′50″N 122°40′10″W	259 (79)	24	2006	Residential	
30	Broadway Tower		45°30′52″N 122°40′57″W	258 (78.5)	19	2018	Mixed-use	Mixed-use office and hotel building.
31	200 Market		45°30′41″N 122°40′43″W	257 (78.3)	19	1973	Office	
32	Lloyd 700		45°31′52″N 122°39′29″W	250 (76.2)	16	1970	Office	
33	One Main Place		45°30′56″N 122°40′32″W	250 (76.2)	20	1982	Office	
34	Benson Tower		45°30′53″N 122°41′09″W	250 (76.2)	26	2007	Residential	
35	Aster Tower		45°31′49″N 122°39′26″W	250 (76.2)	21	2015	Residential	Also known as Hassalo on Eighth.
36	Willamette Tower	–	45°29′44″N 122°40′09″W	250 (76.2)	23	2024	Residential	Construction started in 2021. Known as Block 41 during planning and construction.
37	Byline Apartments		45°31′15″N 122°41′20″W	250 (76)	23	2025	Residential	Part of the Press Blocks development.
38	Grant Tower	–	45°30′24″N 122°40′45″W	247 (75)	26	1975	Residential	Part of American Plaza, a high-rise residential complex.
39	Bank of America Center		45°31′06″N 122°40′26″W	246 (75)	18	1987	Office	
40	Liberty Centre		45°31′47″N 122°39′33″W	246 (75)	18	1997	Office	
41	Vista North Pearl	–	45°32′00″N 122°41′00″W	246 (75)	21	2018	Residential	
42	OHSU Center for Health & Healing, Building 2		45°29′54″N 122°40′17″W	246 (75)	15	2019	Health	Addition to the OHSU Center for Health & Healing in 2019, 13 years after the first building.
43	Harrison West		45°30′38″N 122°40′46″W	243 (74)	25	1965	Residential	Part of Harrison Apartment Towers, a complex of three residential towers. Tallest building in Portland from 1965 to 1969.
44	Kaiser Permanente Building		45°31′52″N 122°39′36″W	243 (74)	16	1974	Office	
45	Hilton Portland Hotel		45°31′03″N 122°40′48″W	241 (73.5)	22	1963	Hotel	Briefly the tallest building in Portland from 1963 to 1965. Also called Hilton Portland Downtown.
46	Ladd Tower		45°30′55″N 122°40′57″W	240 (73.2)	21	2009	Residential	
47	The Meriweather East		45°29′51″N 122°40′07″W	238 (72.5)	21	2006	Residential	
48	Pioneer Tower	–	45°31′03″N 122°40′40″W	235 (71.6)	17	1990	Office	
49	Harrison Tower Apartments & Villas	–	45°30′35″N 122°40′46″W	234 (71.3)	24	1966	Residential	Part of Harrison Apartment Towers, a complex of three residential towers.
50	The Bidwell Marriott Portland		45°31′14″N 122°40′43″W	233 (71)	20	1999	Hotel	Formerly known as Portland Marriott City Center. It closed for renovations in 2020 and reopened in 2021 as The Bidwell Marriott Portland
51	Portland Building		45°30′56″N 122°40′43″W	231 (70.4)	15	1982	Office	
52	World Trade Center		45°30′59″N 122°40′29″W	230 (70.1)	17	1975	Office	
53	Riva on the Park		45°29′46″N 122°40′17″W	230 (70.1)	22	2009	Residential	
54	Metropolitan Condos		45°31′49″N 122°40′54″W	225 (68.6)	19	2007	Residential	
55	Alta ART Tower	–	45°31′19″N 122°41′15″W	224 (68)	21	2021	Residential	
56	Commonwealth Building		45°31′15″N 122°40′41″W	223 (68)	14	1948	Office	Tallest building in Portland from 1948 to 1962. Tallest building completed in Portland in the 1940s. Originally known as the Equitable Building. One of the first glass box towers ever built.
57	Harrison East	–	45°30′37″N 122°40′42″W	223 (68)	22	1966	Residential	Part of Harrison Apartment Towers, a complex of three residential towers.
58	Standard Plaza		45°30′57″N 122°40′47″W	222 (67.7)	16	1962	Office	
59	Pacific First Center		45°31′05″N 122°40′47″W	221 (67.4)	16	1981	Office	
60	735 St. Clair	–	45°31′22″N 122°41′50″W	221 (67)	25	1964	Residential	
61	Public Service Building		45°31′02″N 122°40′45″W	220 (67.1)	15	1927	Office	Tallest building in Portland from 1927 to 1948. Tallest building completed in Portland in the 1920s.
62	Eliot Tower		45°30′59″N 122°41′04″W	220 (67.1)	18	2006	Residential	
63	Portland Astoria	–	45°30′47″N 122°40′36″W	218 (66)	20	2021	Residential	
64	The Duniway Portland		45°31′04″N 122°40′43″W	216 (66)	20	2002	Hotel	Originally known as the Hilton Executive Tower. Rebranded as The Duniway Portland, but remains a Hilton hotel.
65	5 MLK		45°31′21″N 122°39′44″W	213 (65)	17	2020	Mixed-use	Mixed-use residential and office building.
66	Madison Tower	–	45°30′23″N 122°40′47″W	212 (65)	22	1980	Residential	Part of American Plaza, a high-rise residential complex.
67	First & Main		45°30′53″N 122°40′32″W	210 (64.1)	15	2010	Office	
68	The Watermark at the Pearl	–	45°32′03″N 122°41′03″W	209 (64)	16	2023	Residential	Retirement village. Features 237 residences, including 140 independent living units, 77 assisted living units, and 20 memory care units.
69	Meier & Frank Building		45°31′09″N 122°40′40″W	209 (63.7)	15	1932	Mixed-use	
70	Dossier Hotel		45°31′12″N 122°40′48″W	208 (63)	19	1999	Hotel	Formerly The Westin Portland. The hotel was rebranded as the Dossier Hotel in 2017.
71	Yard		45°31′24″N 122°39′48″W	208 (63.4)	21	2016	Residential	Contains retail units.
72	American Bank Building		45°31′10″N 122°40′44″W	207 (63.1)	15	1913	Office	Tallest building in Portland from 1913 to 1927. First building in Portland to be taller than 200 ft (61 m). Tallest building completed in Portland in the 1910s.
73	Joseph R. Robertson Collaborative Life Sciences Building	–	45°30′12″N 122°40′19″W	202 (62)	12	2014	Health	

== Timeline of tallest buildings ==
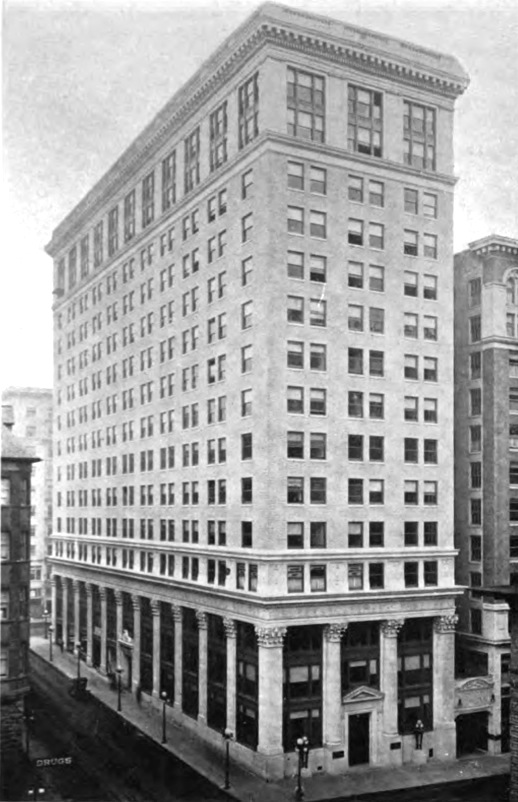
The American Bank Building stood as the tallest building in Portland from 1913 until 1927.

Since 1892, the year The Oregonian Building was completed, the title of the tallest building in Portland has been held by ten high-rises.

Name	Image	Years as tallest	Height ft (m)	Floors	Reference
The Oregonian Building (Note: The Oregonian Building was demolished in 1950.)		1892–1913 (21 years)	194 (59.1)	12	
Yeon Building		1911–1913 (2 years)	194 (59.1)	15	
American Bank Building		1913–1927 (14 years)	207 (63.1)	15	
Public Service Building		1927–1948 (21 years)	220 (67.1)	16	
Commonwealth Building		1948–1962 (14 years)	223 (68)	14	
Hilton Portland Hotel		1962–1965 (3 years)	241 (74.5)	22	
Harrison West		1965–1969 (4 years)	256 (78)	25	
OnPoint Plaza		1969–1970 (1 year)	268 (81.8)	15	
Standard Insurance Center		1970–1972 (2 years)	367 (111.9)	27	
Wells Fargo Center		1972–present (54 years)	546 (166.4)	40	

== Skylines ==
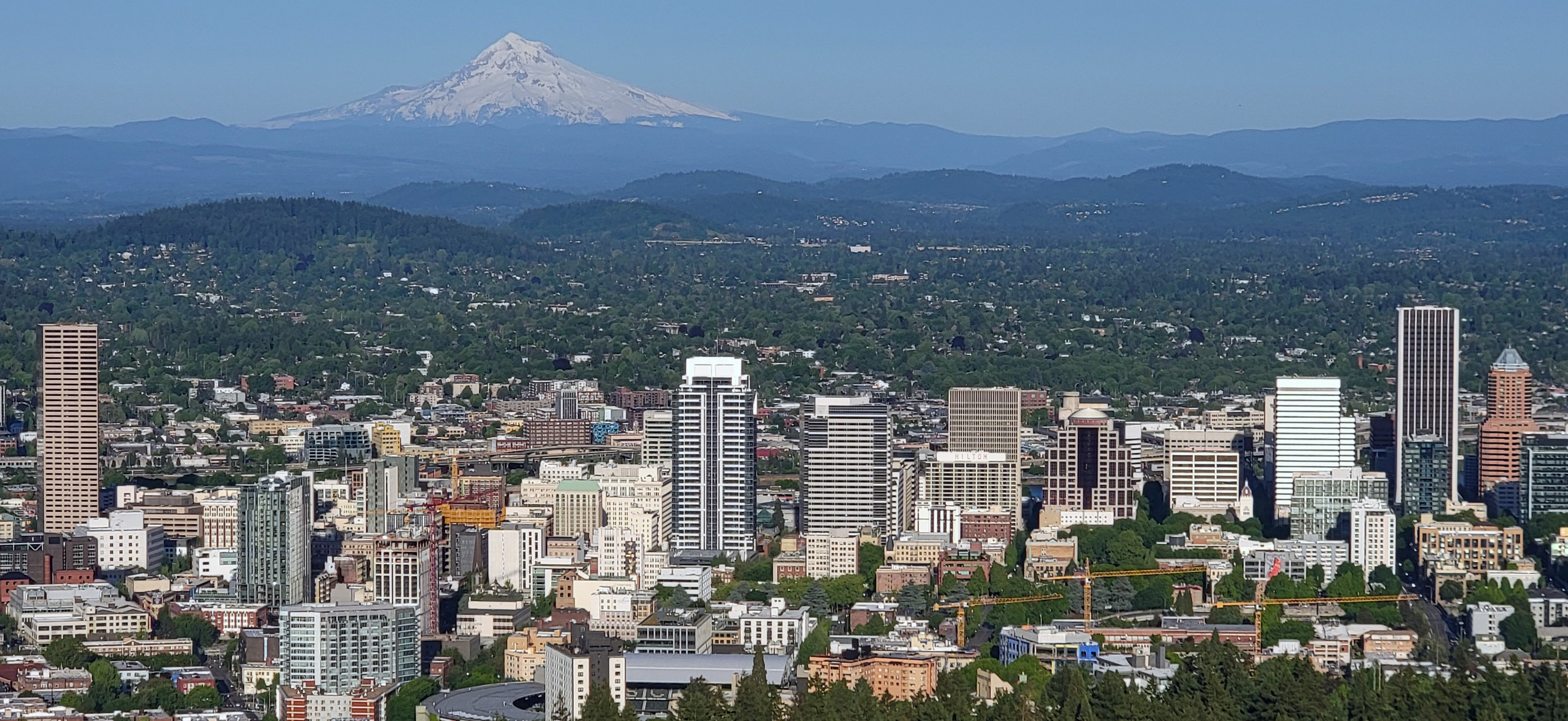
Downtown Portland

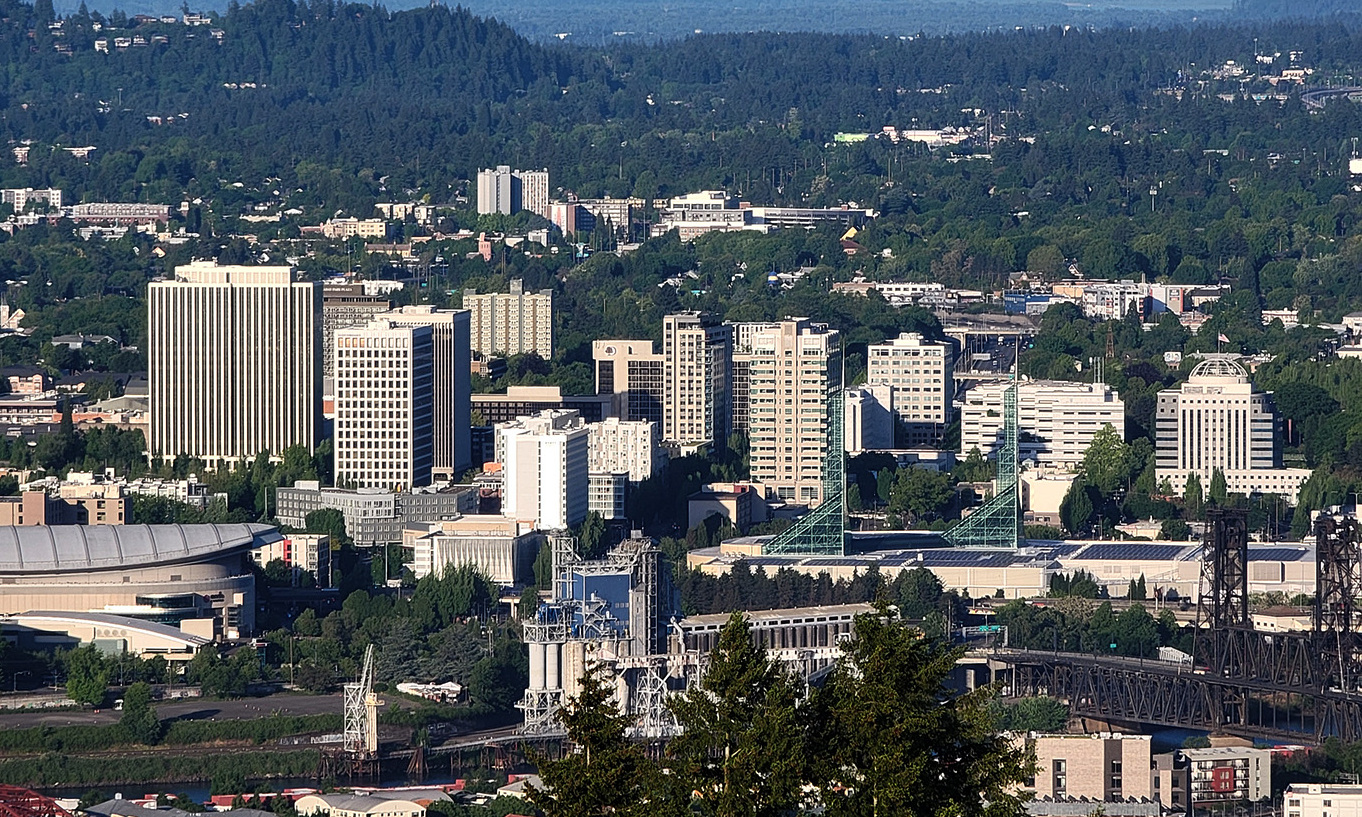
Lloyd District

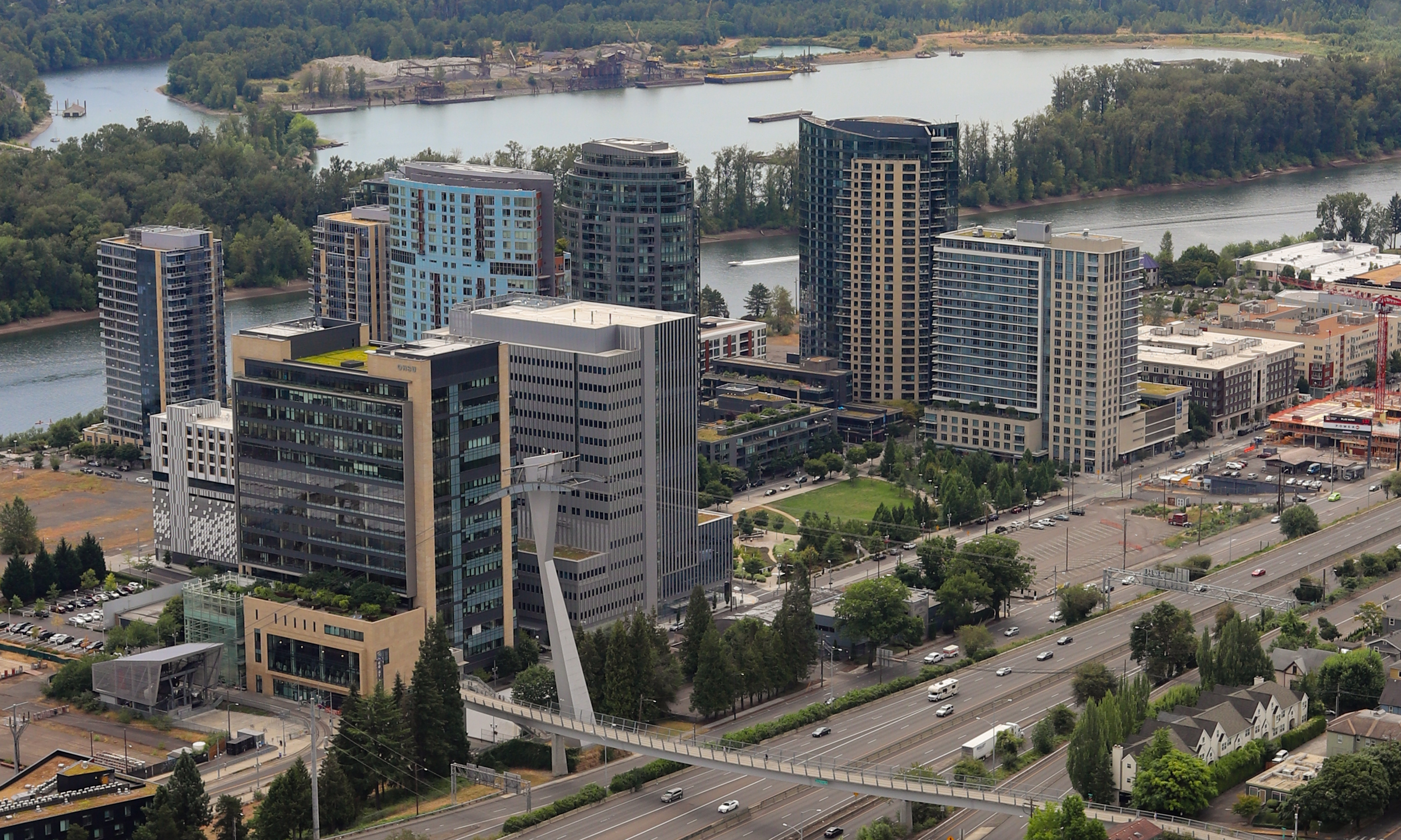
South Waterfront

== See also ==
- Architecture of Portland, Oregon
- List of tallest buildings in the United States
- List of tallest buildings in Seattle
- List of tallest buildings in Vancouver
