= Sky3 Place =

Building in Portland, Oregon, U.S.

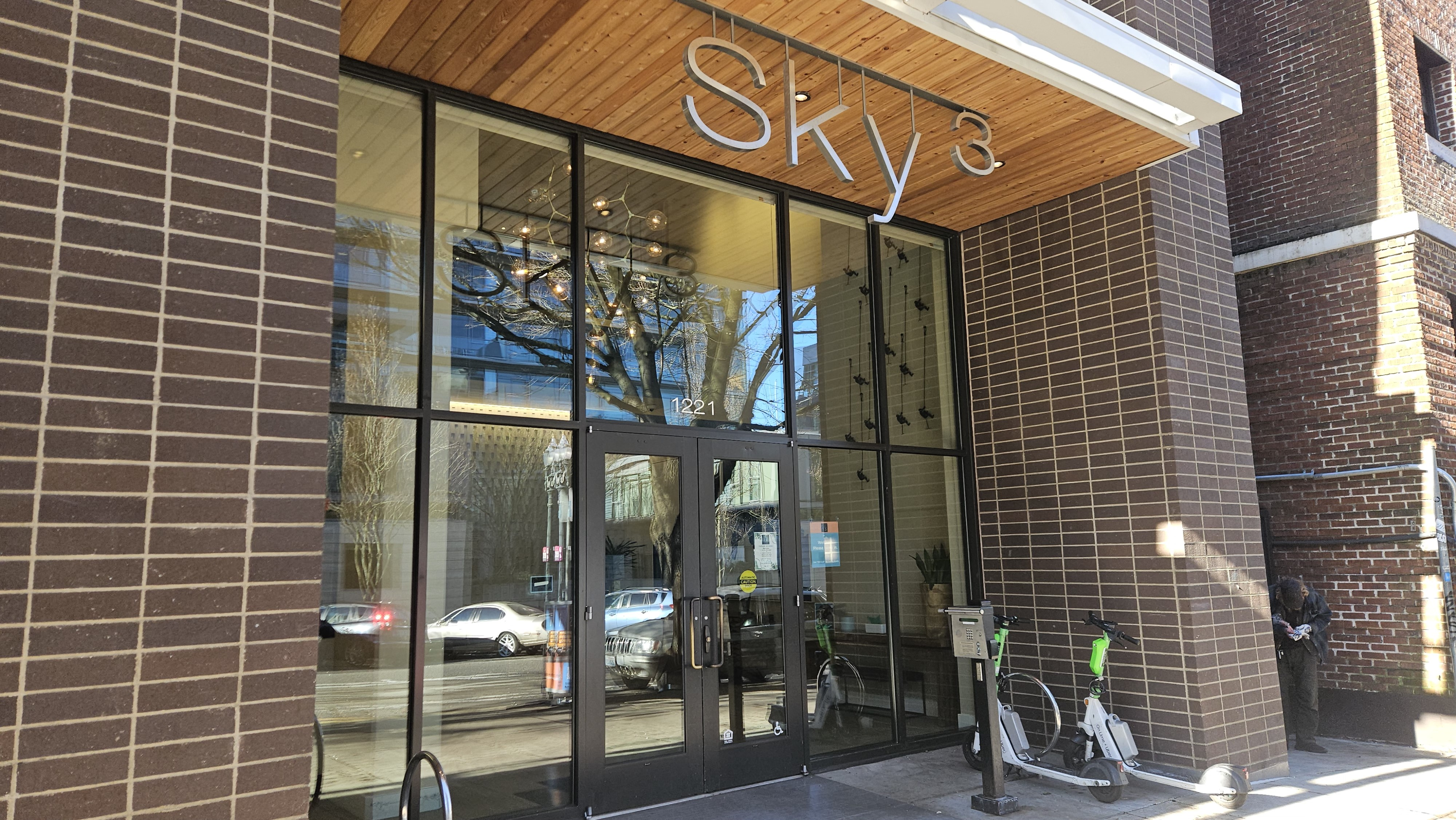
- Interactive map of the Sky3 Place area

General information
- Location: Portland, Oregon, United States
- Coordinates: 45°30′59.8″N 122°41′8.5″W

Sky3 Place is a 15-story, mixed-use tower in Portland, Oregon, in the United States.

== See also ==
- List of tallest buildings in Portland, Oregon
