= Ardea =

Ardea may refer to:

- Ardea, Lazio, a town in Lazio, Italy
- Ardea (bird), a genus of large herons and some egrets
- Ardea (journal), an ornithological journal published by the Netherlands Ornithologists' Union
- The Ardea, a condominium high-rise building in Portland, Oregon, USA
- Lancia Ardea, a small car produced by the Turin firm between 1939 and 1953
- Aridaia, a small town in Pella, Macedonia, Greece
