= Mirabella Portland =

Residential building in Portland, Oregon, U.S.

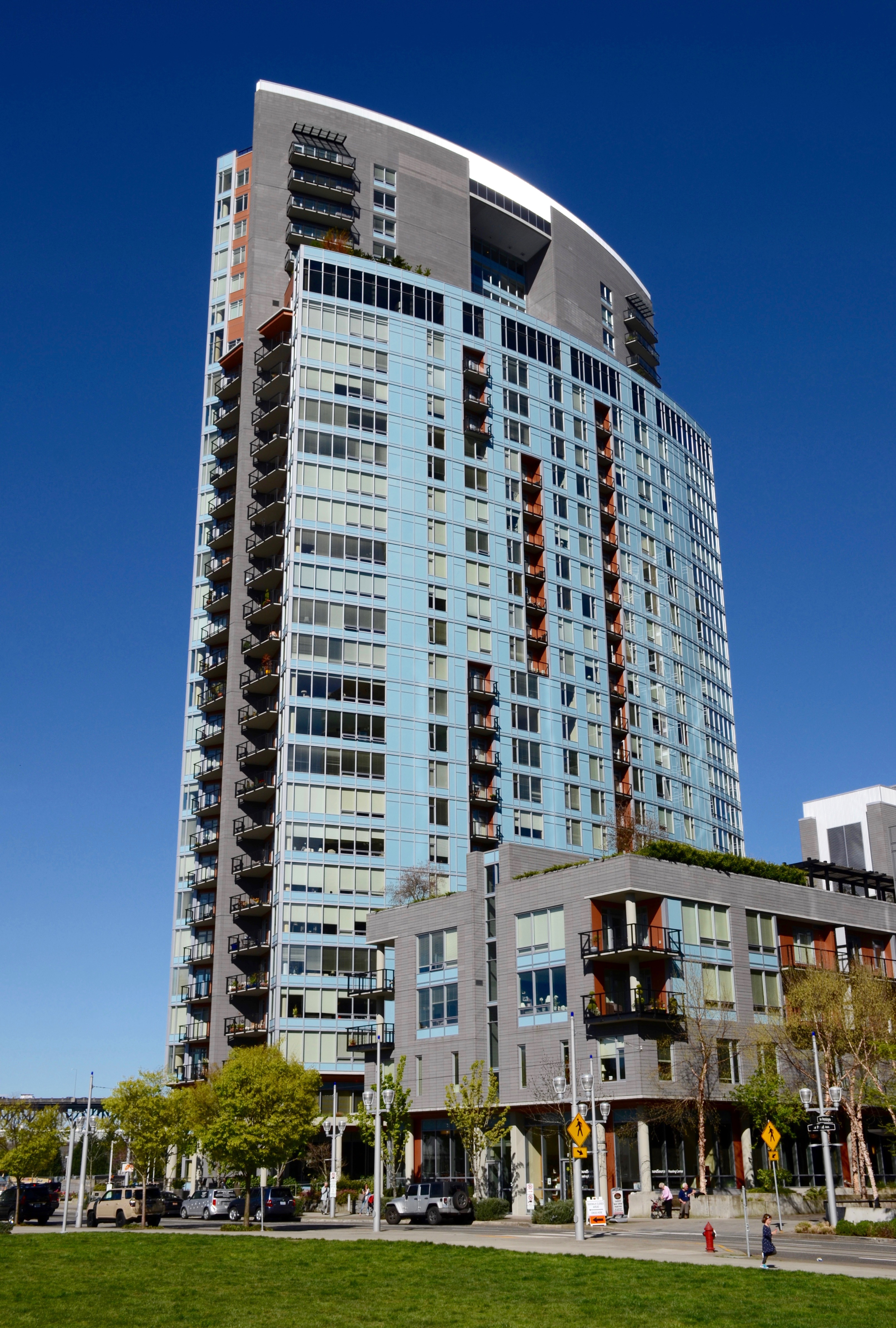
- South façade of the Mirabella in 2016

- Location within Portland, Oregon

General information
- Type: Residential
- Location: 3550 SW Bond Ave; Portland, Oregon
- Coordinates: 45.497472°N 122.670261°W
- Completed: 2010

Height
- Roof: 99 m (325 ft)

Technical details
- Floor count: 30

Design and construction
- Architect: Ankrom Moisan Architects
- Main contractor: Hoffman Construction Company

The Mirabella Portland, also known as simply the Mirabella, is a high-rise building in the South Waterfront District in Portland, Oregon, United States. Architecture and interior design for the Mirabella was performed by Ankrom Moisan Architects. Construction began in 2008 on the 99-metre (325 ft) tall residential tower. It joined both the John Ross Tower and 3720 Tower as the seventh-tallest building in Portland when it was completed in 2010. The Mirabella consists of 30 floors and features 284 senior citizen housing units. The building is the first senior living community in the South Waterfront District. Mirabella received a platinum certification under LEED guidelines in October 2010.

== See also ==
- List of tallest buildings in Portland, Oregon
