= Benson Tower (Portland, Oregon) =

Residential high-rise building located in downtown Portland, Oregon

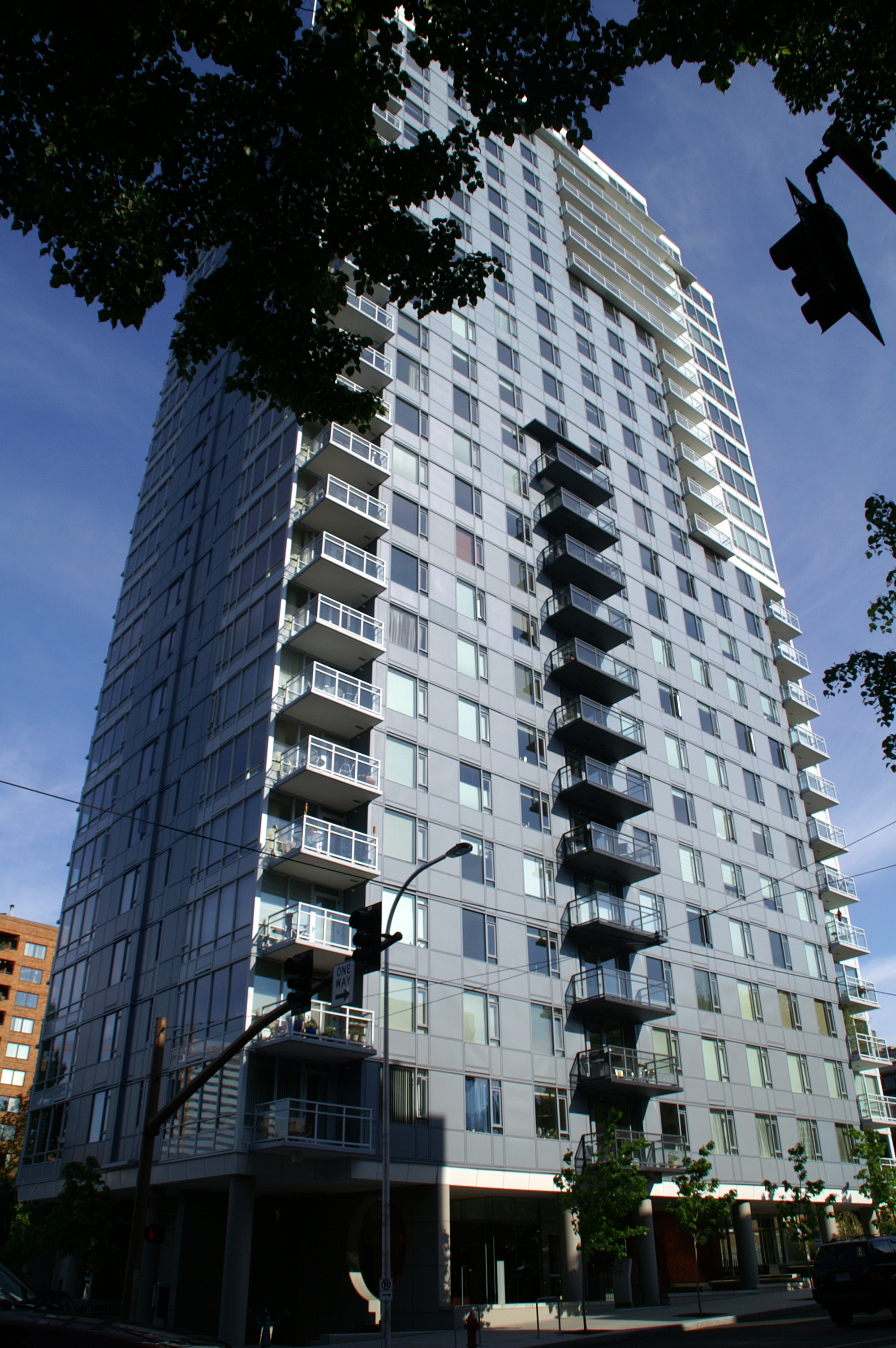
- Benson Tower from NW corner

- Location within Portland, Oregon

General information
- Type: Residential
- Location: Portland, Oregon
- Coordinates: 45.5146398°N 122.685849°W
- Completed: 2007

Height
- Roof: 76 m (249 ft)

Technical details
- Floor count: 26
- Lifts/elevators: 3

Design and construction
- Architects: Hancock Bruckner now IBI Group, Vancouver, B.C.
- Structural engineer: Glotman Simpson, Vancouver, B.C.
- Main contractor: ITC Construction Inc., Portland, Or, Head Office, Vancouver, B.C.

The Benson Tower is a residential high-rise building located in downtown Portland, Oregon, United States. It stands at a height of 250 feet (76 meters) and was completed in late 2007.

It was named after the historic timber baron Simon Benson, as the tower was built on the site of his original residence. The Benson Tower has 26 floors and features 58 single bedroom condominiums, 92 two bedroom condominiums and 6 penthouses. Designed in the modern Vancouver, B.C. point tower style by Hancock Brucker, now IBI Group of Vancouver, B.C. and constructed by ITC Construction Group of Vancouver, B.C. The project attracted controversy from the local and international trade unions as it was built using open shop practices. ITC Construction Group is large general contractor with over 120 highrise towers to its credit in Western Canada and the Northwest USA.

== See also ==
- List of tallest buildings in Portland, Oregon
