= Hassalo on Eighth =

Mixed-use high-rise building located in the Lloyd District of Portland, Oregon

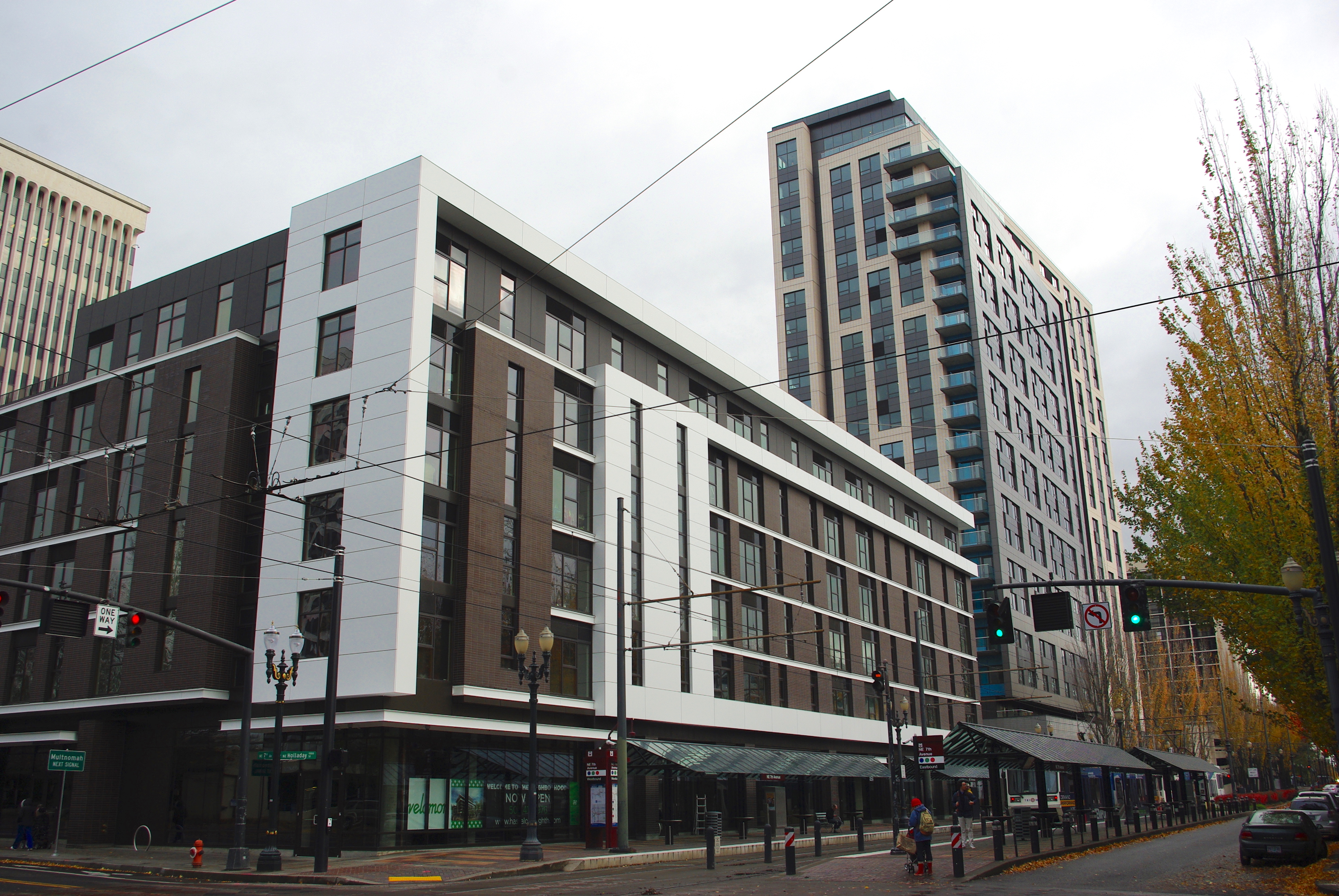
- Hassalo on Eighth from the west

General information
- Type: Mixed-use
- Location: Portland, Oregon
- Coordinates: 45.530726°N 122.65749°W
- Completed: 2015
- Cost: $192 million
- Owner: American Assets Trust

Height
- Roof: 265 ft (81 m)

Technical details
- Floor count: 21

Design and construction
- Developer: American Assets Trust

The Hassalo on Eighth is a multi-building, mixed-use high-rise building located in the Lloyd District of Portland, Oregon, United States. Completed in 2015, the tallest tower rises to a height of 265 ft (81 m). The three-building development contains both residential and commercial space.

== History ==
The project was announced in March 2012 by Langley Investment Properties, and at that time called for 750 apartments on the superblock at Eighth Avenue and Hassalo Street along NE Holladay Street. Construction on the development began in September 2013 with the number of apartments reduced to around 660. The tallest building in the project topped out in February 2015. Construction on the buildings concluded in October 2015.

== Details ==
The complex's name comes from its location at the intersection of NE Hassalo and Eighth streets in the Lloyd District. Aster Tower is the tallest of the three buildings, rising to 265 feet and 21 stories. Hassalo on Eighth was developed by American Assets Trust at a cost of $192 million. It includes 657 apartments and almost 1,200 bike parking spaces, plus ground floor retail.

== See also ==
- List of tallest buildings in Portland, Oregon
