= 200 Market =

Building in Portland, Oregon, U.S.

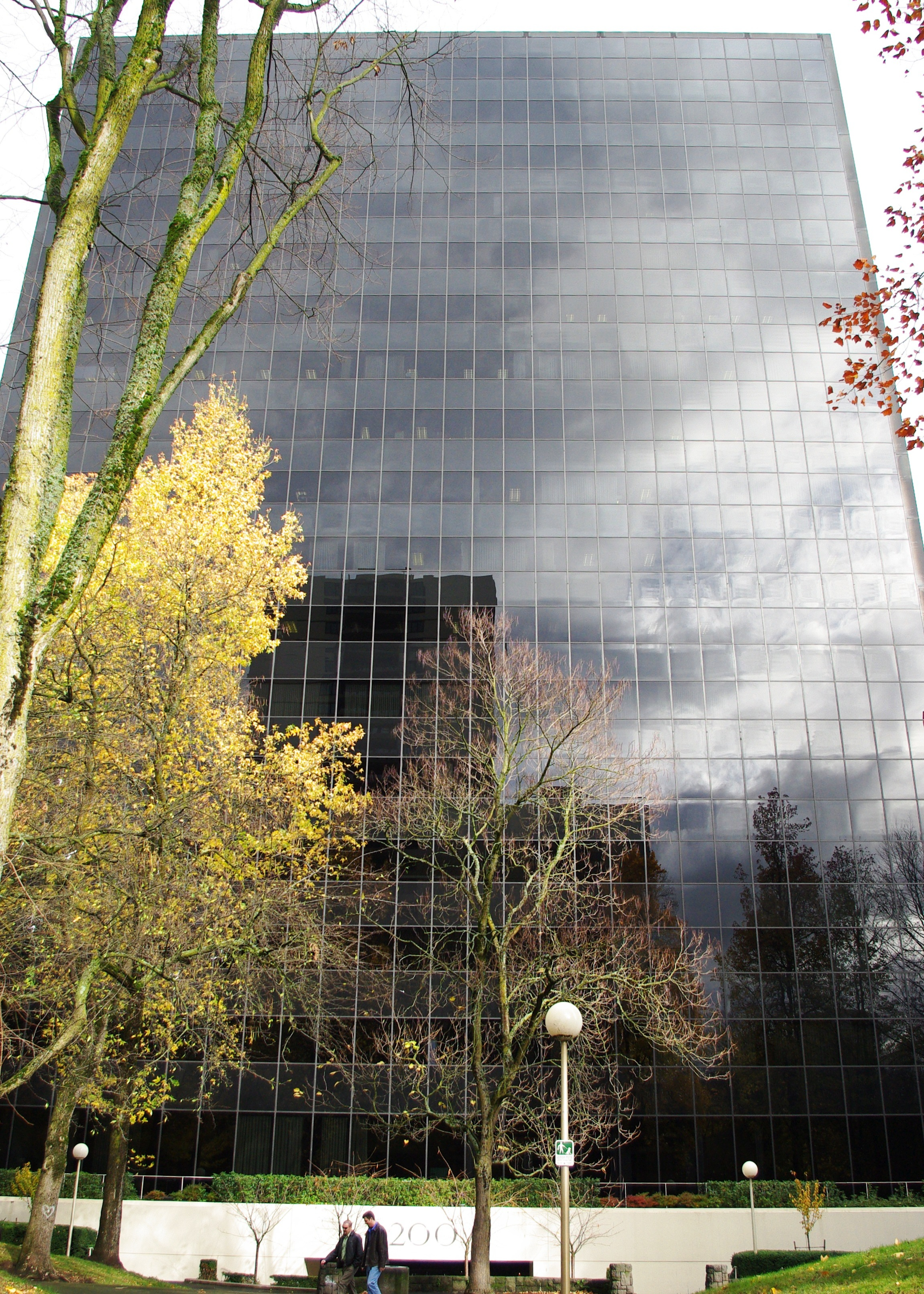
- The building's exterior, 2009

- Location within Portland, Oregon

General information
- Type: Commercial office
- Location: Portland, Oregon
- Coordinates: 45.5116°N 122.67940°W
- Completed: 1973

Height
- Roof: 257 ft (78 m)

Technical details
- Floor count: 19
- Floor area: 400,000 sq ft (37,000 m^{2})
- Lifts/elevators: 6

200 Market, also known as the Black Box, is a 19-story high-rise commercial office building in downtown Portland, Oregon, United States. Located across Market Street from Keller Auditorium, it was completed in 1973 and certified LEED Platinum in 2010. It was the first multi-tenant building in the U.S. to be LEED Gold-certified, in 2006.

== History ==
Real estate developer John Russell purchased the tower for $21.5 million in 1988. His company received a loan for $63 million from MetLife, using 200 Market as collateral, in 2017, and later defaulted on that loan when Regence Blue Cross Blue Shield (now Cambia Health Solutions) reduced its space. In June 2025, MetLife filed a lawsuit against its owner Russell seeking foreclosure. Financial trouble started after Regence Blue Cross' lease expired. The tower then sold for about $70 million in April 2026, with $38.5 million of that being assumed debt. 200 Market was purchased by Melvin Mark Investors and Jeff Swickard.

== Details ==
The building has 18 floors for tenants and a total of 400,000 square feet (37,000 m^{2}) with 19,000 square feet (1,800 m^{2}) per floor.

== Tenants ==
- Cambia Health Solutions

== See also ==
- Awning (sculpture)
- List of tallest buildings in Portland, Oregon
