= The Meriwether =

Pair of residential towers in Portland, Oregon, U.S.

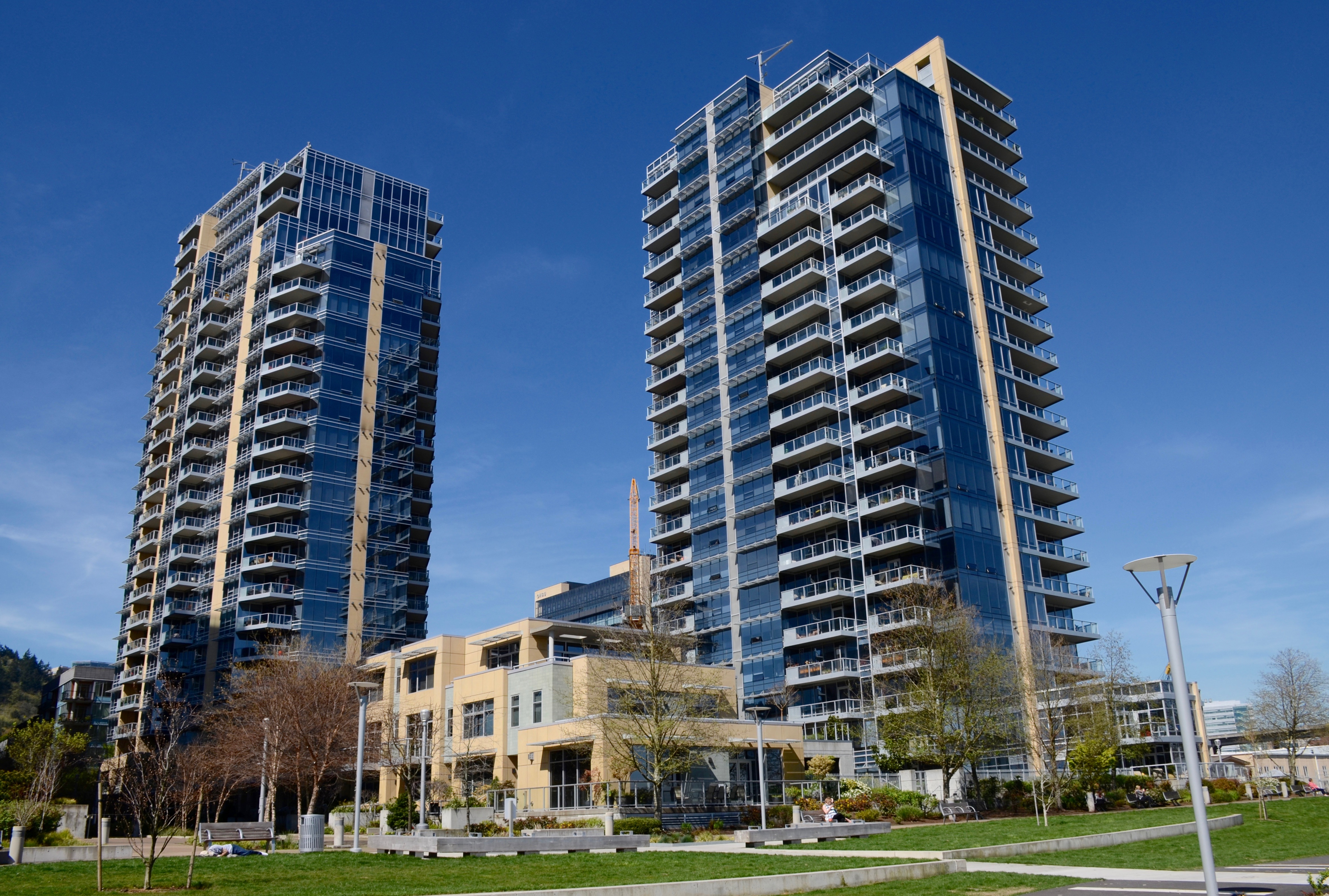
- The west (left) and east buildings of the Meriwether

- Location within Portland, Oregon

General information
- Type: Residential, condominium
- Location: 3570 SW River Parkway; Portland, Oregon
- Coordinates: 45.497468°N 122.668877°W
- Construction started: 2004
- Completed: 2006
- Cost: US$105.5 million

Height
- Roof: West building: approx. 303 ft (92 m); East building: approx. 265 ft (81 m)

Technical details
- Floor count: West building 24; East building 21

Design and construction
- Architects: Busby & Associates Architects; GBD Architects
- Developer: Gerding Edlen Development
- Main contractor: Hoffman Construction Company

The Meriwether is a pair of condominium towers in Portland, Oregon's South Waterfront district, in the United States, which were completed in 2006. They are named in honor of noted explorer Meriwether Lewis.

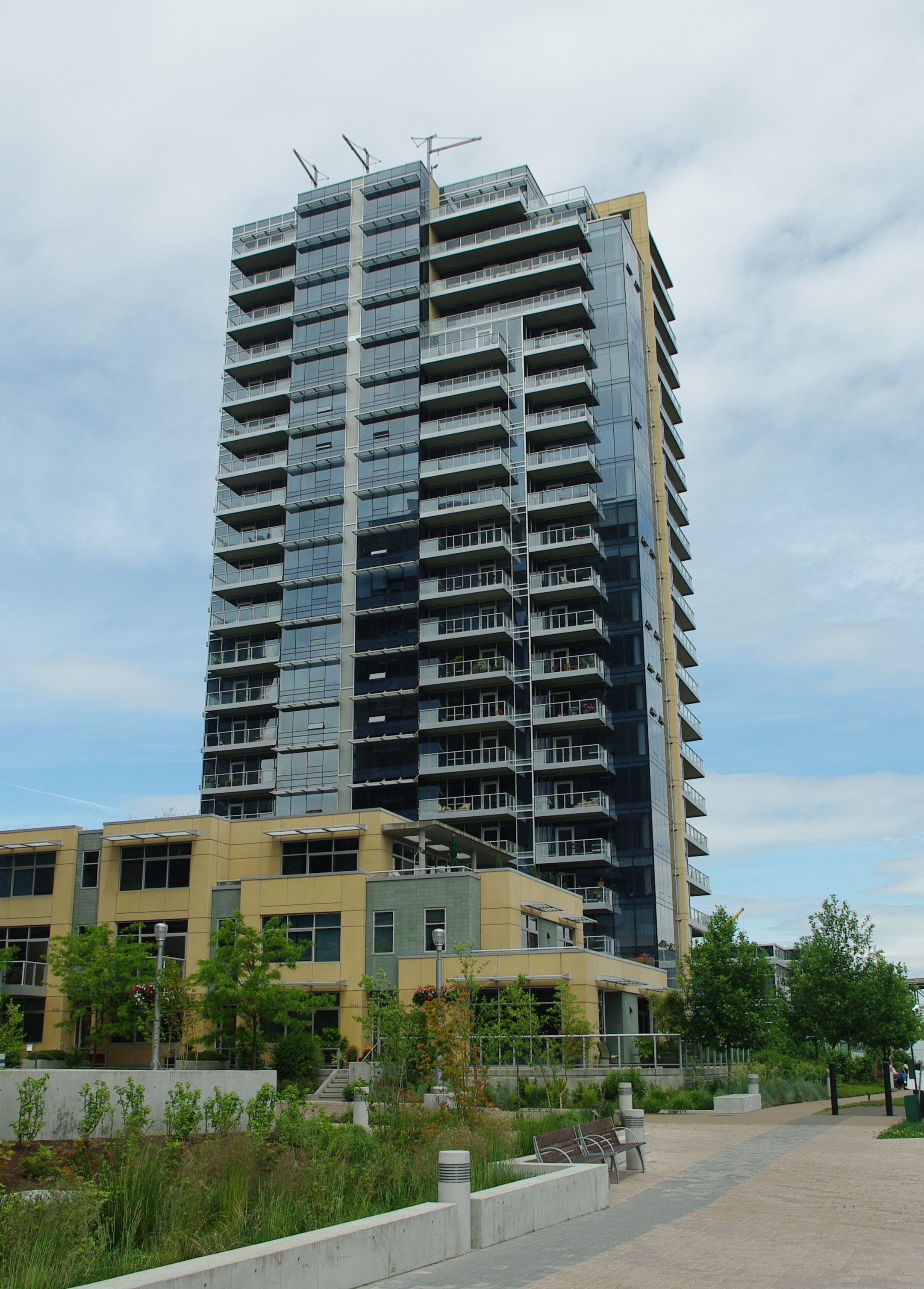
East building, 2009

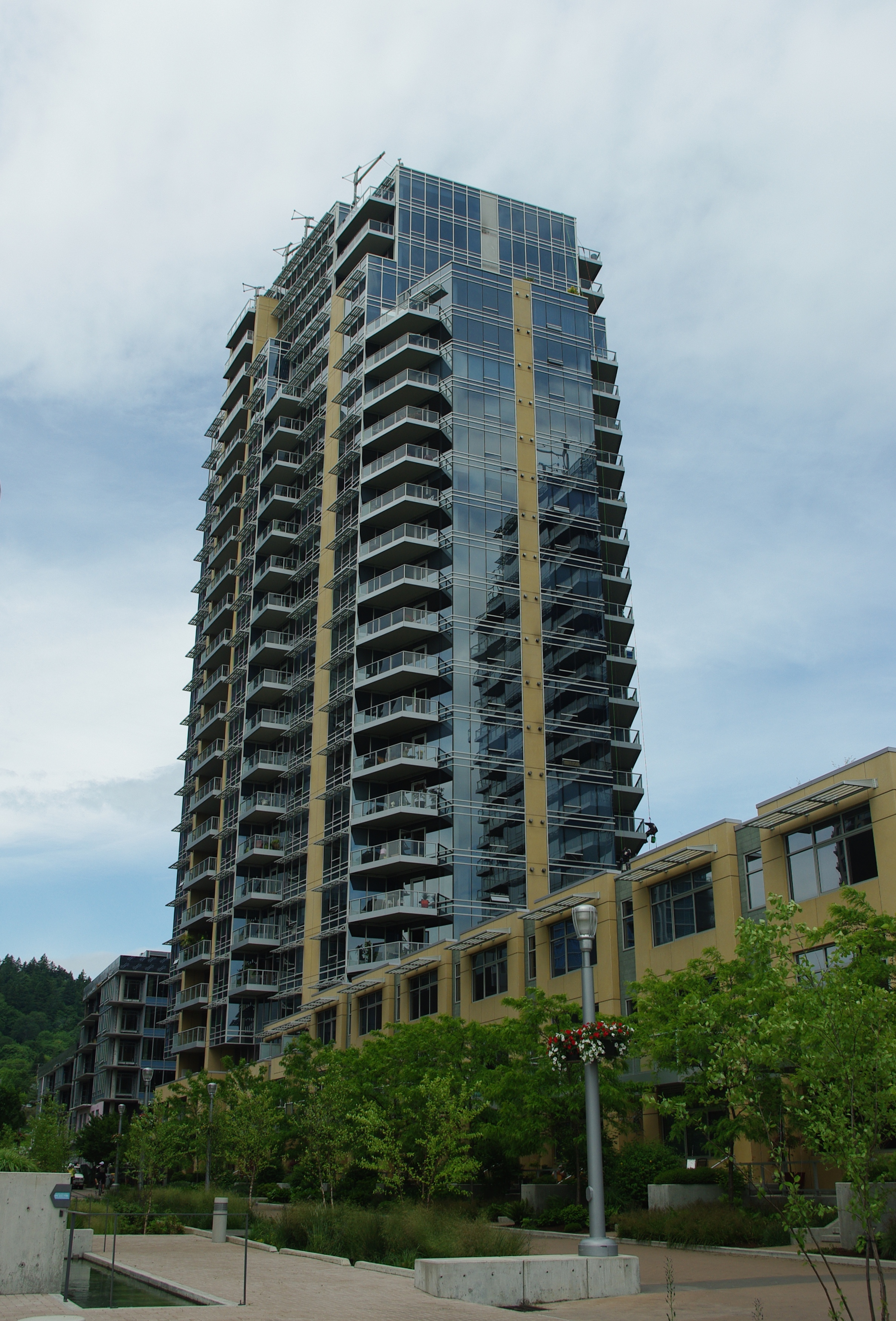
West building, 2009

== See also ==
- List of tallest buildings in Portland, Oregon
