= NV (Portland, Oregon) =

Residential skyscraper in Portland, Oregon

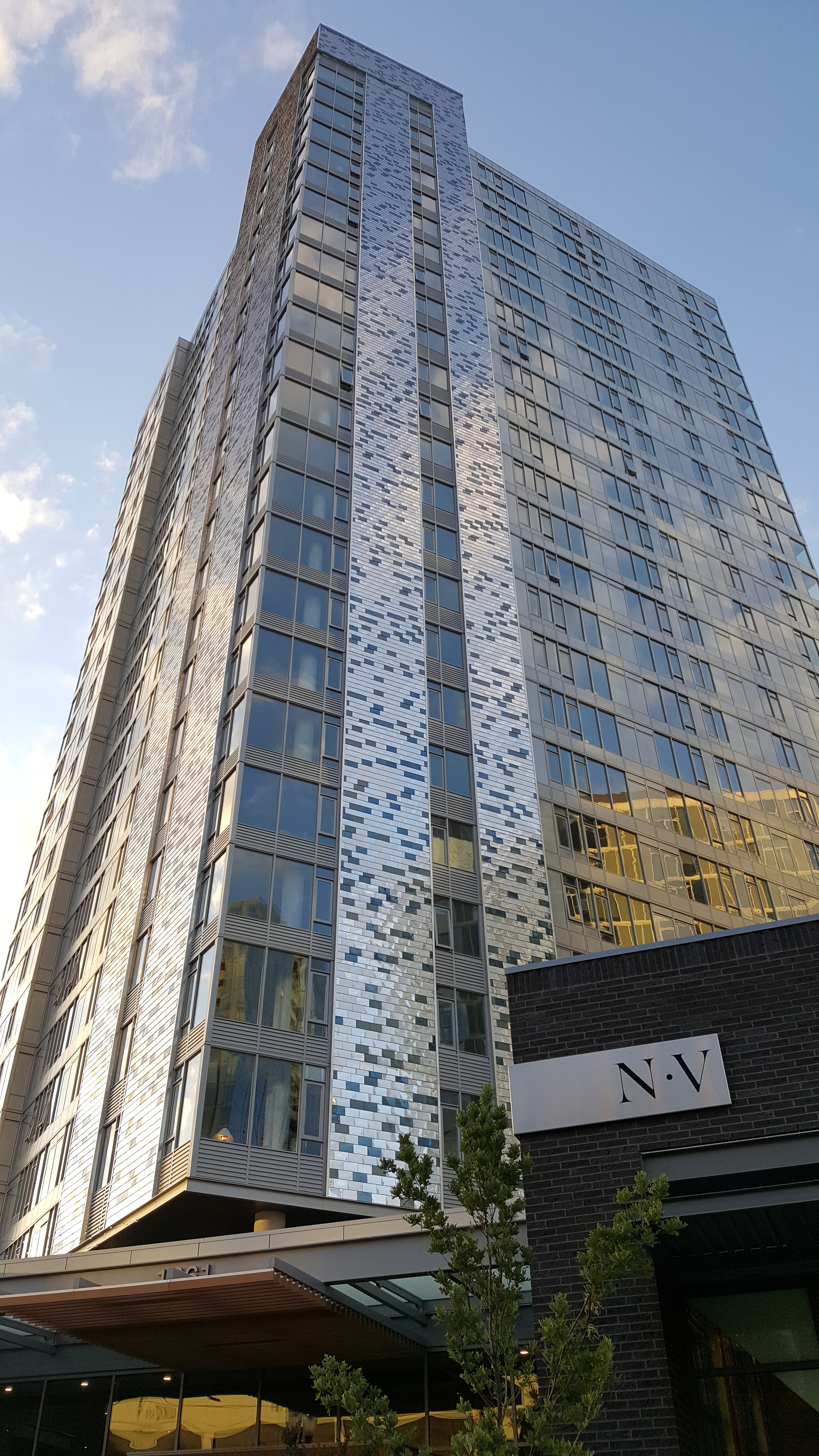
- The building's exterior in 2017

- Location within Portland, Oregon
- Former names: The Overton

General information
- Type: Residential apartments
- Location: 1261 NW Overton Street; Portland, Oregon
- Coordinates: 45.53253°N 122.68402°W
- Construction started: 2014
- Completed: 2016

Height
- Roof: 287 ft (87 m)

Technical details
- Floor count: 26

Design and construction
- Architect: ZGF Architects
- Developer: Unico Properties
- Main contractor: Andersen Construction

Other information
- Number of units: 284 Units

NV (pronounced as envy) is a 26-story residential high-rise in the Pearl District in Portland, Oregon. Formerly known as The Overton, the 272-foot (83 m) tower opened in 2016.

== History ==
Plans for a 26-story apartment building at the site, to be called The Overton, were announced in November 2012. The city approved the design in April 2014. Demolition of a warehouse on the site began in July 2014. Construction on the tower began in August 2014 by developer Unico Properties. The construction process was complicated by the fact that the contractor was building two other residential towers adjacent to NV. The residential high-rise opened in September 2016.

== Features ==
NV stands 287 feet (87 m) tall over 26 floors. The first two floors contain retail space, with the rest of the 225,000-square-foot (20,900 m^{2}) tower consisting of 284 apartments. It has 271 spaces of underground parking, and the structure uses a concrete shear wall design. The project was developed by Seattle's Unico Properties and constructed by Andersen Construction, with the design by ZGF Architects. A large terrace sits on top of the retail portion of the structure, with the residential tower occupying the rest of platform. The tower is rotated by 45-degrees in order to allow residents enhanced views.

== See also ==
- List of tallest buildings in Portland, Oregon
