= Twelve West =

22-floor, mixed-use apartment and office building located in downtown Portland, Oregon

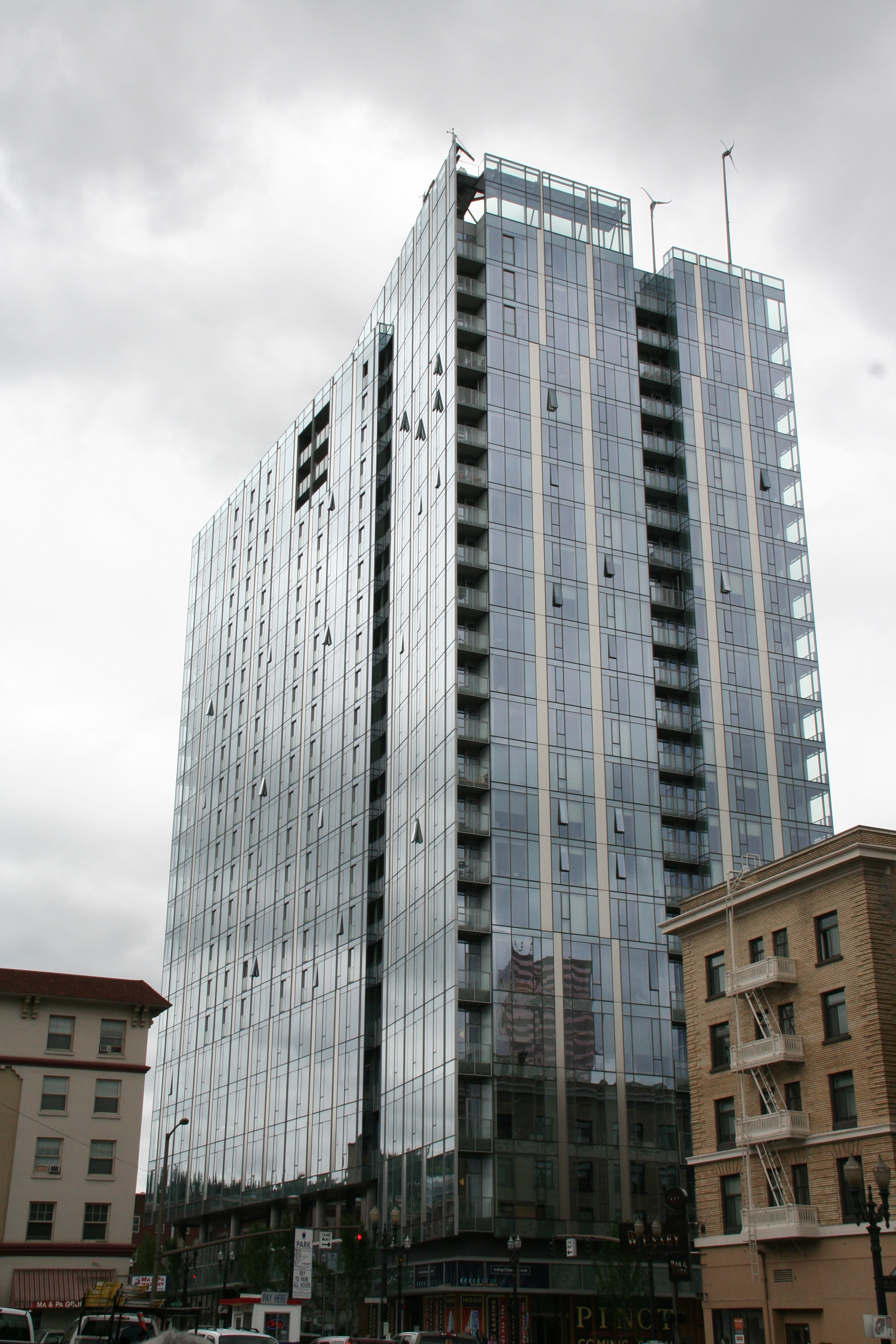

- Location within Portland, Oregon

General information
- Type: retail, office, luxury apartments, parking
- Location: S.W. 12th & Washington, Portland, Oregon, United States
- Coordinates: 45.5221°N 122.6839°W
- Construction started: 2007
- Completed: 2009
- Opening: 2009
- Cost: $137 million

Height
- Roof: 266 feet (81 m)

Technical details
- Floor count: 22
- Lifts/elevators: 7

Design and construction
- Architect: ZGF Architects
- Developer: Gerding Edlen
- Main contractor: Hoffman Construction

Twelve West (stylized as twelve | west) is a 22-floor, mixed-use apartment and office building located in downtown Portland, Oregon, United States. The building is home to INDIGO @ twelve | west apartments and ZGF Architects LLP. During design and construction the building was known as “12W” and “ZGF Tower”, but the name changed after a naming contest in July 2009. Initial plans included a hotel and a total of 31 floors, but they were revised after the hotel company withdrew.

== Wind turbines ==
Four 45-foot-tall (14m) wind turbines are mounted on the roof for the purpose of research and generating electricity. The turbines were expected to generate 9,000 kilowatt hours yearly and provide data on wind flows and bird-strikes. However, a study from the NREL indicated that the turbines are less productive; the system "generates approximately 5,500 kilowatt-hours (kWh)/year."

== Tenants ==
There are three distinct uses for twelve | west in separate parts of the building. Ground floor provides retail space, a building lobby, and garage access. Floors 2–5 are offices, currently the headquarters of ZGF Architects LLP, the architect of the building.

== See also ==
- List of tallest buildings in Portland, Oregon
- Architecture in Portland, Oregon
