= Portland Plaza =

Skyscraper in downtown Portland

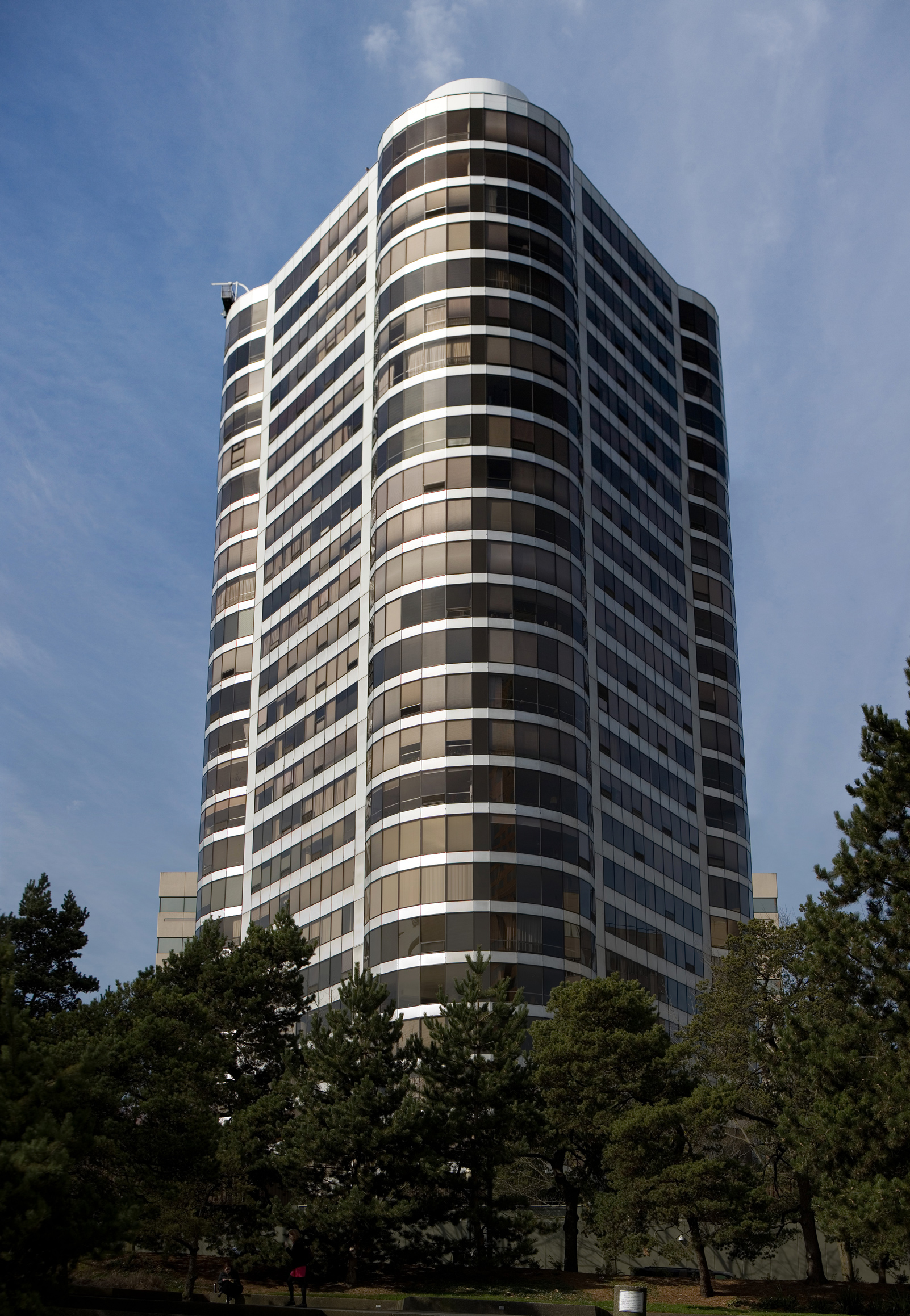
- The building's exterior in 2008

- Location in Portland

General information
- Type: Residential
- Location: Portland, Oregon
- Coordinates: 45°30′46″N 122°40′49″W
- Completed: 1973

Height
- Height: 272 feet (83 m)

Technical details
- Floor count: 25

Design and construction
- Architect: DMJM

The Portland Plaza is a condominium skyscraper in downtown Portland, Oregon, United States. It stands at a height of 272 feet (83 m) and contains 26 floors. The Portland Plaza was designed by the firm of DMJM and was completed in 1973. The building is sometimes referred to as the "Norelco Building", owing to its metallic siding and its footprint bearing a resemblance to an electric shaver.

Enjoying a location almost directly west of the Keller Auditorium and the Ira Keller Fountain, Portland Plaza creates a late mid-20th century modernist feel to the area. Along with the Keller Fountain, the building has been featured on an album cover of the band Shades of Christ, and appeared as a futuristic building in the PBS film version of Ursula K. Le Guin's The Lathe of Heaven.

== See also ==
- Architecture of Portland, Oregon
- List of tallest buildings in Portland, Oregon
