= Moda Tower =

24-story office building in Portland, Oregon

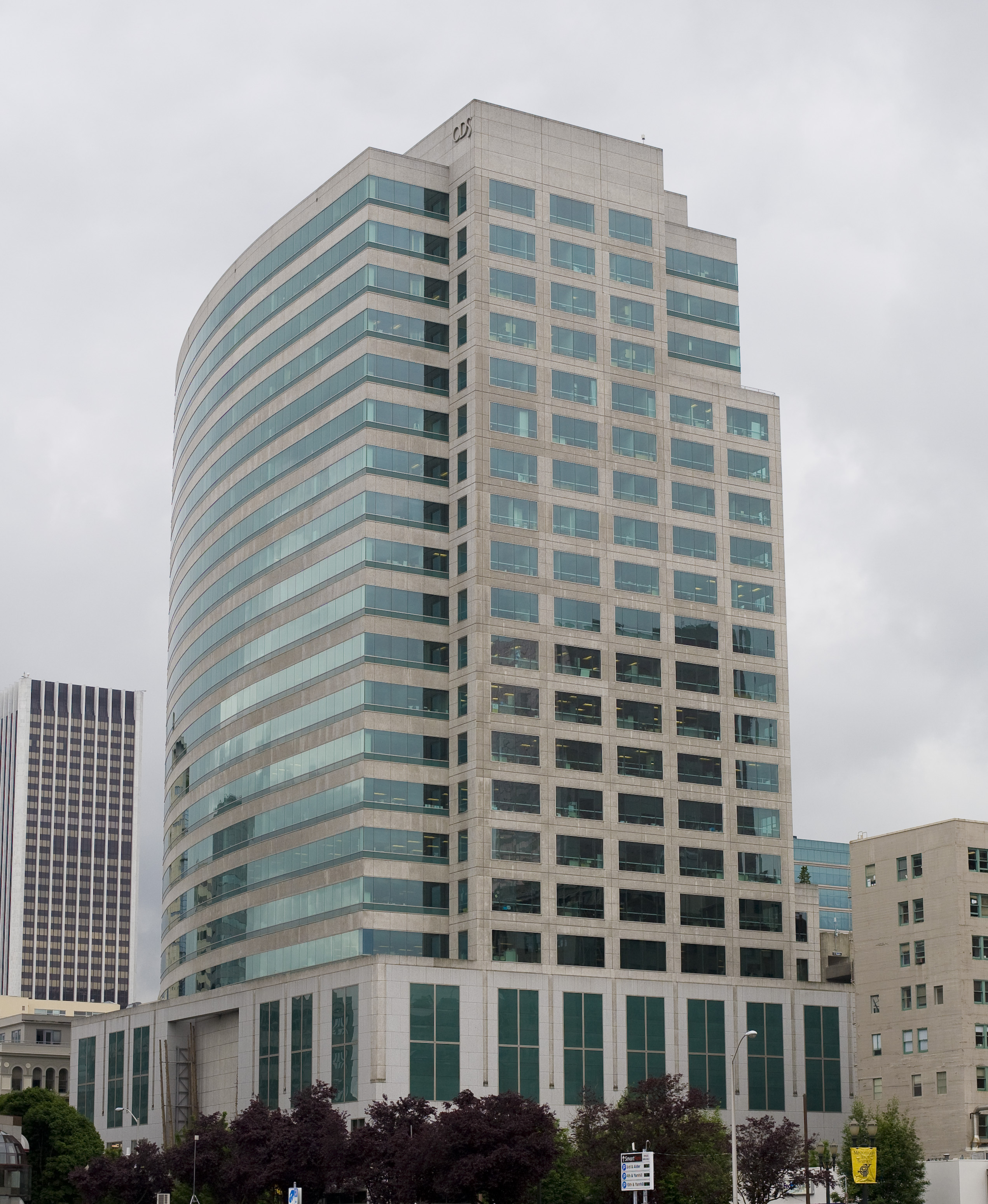
- Northeast corner

- Location within Portland, Oregon
- Former names: ODS Tower

General information
- Type: Commercial offices
- Location: Portland, Oregon
- Coordinates: 45.5183°N 122.6749°W
- Completed: 1999
- Cost: US$34 million
- Owner: Unico Properties, American Realty Advisors

Height
- Roof: 94 m (308 ft)

Technical details
- Floor count: 24
- Floor area: 400,000 sq ft (37,000 m^{2})

Design and construction
- Architect: Zimmer Gunsul Frasca

Moda Tower (formerly ODS Tower) is a 24-story office building in Portland, Oregon. At 308 ft. (94m), it is Portland's seventeenth-tallest building. Health insurance company Moda Health is the primary tenant of the high-rise. Unico Properties purchased Moda Tower in 2018.

== History ==
Construction on the tower began in 1997 and was finished in 1999 at a cost of $34 million, with Zimmer Gunsul Frasca serving as the chief architectural firm for the project. The building was the culmination of many years of efforts to develop the site into a high-rise building, with the site formerly the home of the Chambers and Gerlinger buildings. Prior plans for the site included one in 1990 to build a 460-foot (140 m), 30-story skyscraper to be named the Morrison Tower. Originally owned by the ODS Companies, it sold the building for $123 million in 2005 to Morrison CF-LLC. The building was sold for $129 million in 2013 to UBS and the name was changed to Moda after ODS Health Plans re-branded as Moda Health. In September 2018, the building was acquired by Unico Properties and American Realty Advisors for a reported $178 million.

== Details ==
The main feature of the building's design is a floor plan that allows for six corner offices on each floor. The first four floors are devoted to city-mandated ground-floor retail (Nordstrom Rack, formerly Copeland Sports) and a parking garage. The parking garage has four levels, while the retail space totals 32,600 square feet (3,030 m^{2}). There is a 60-foot (18 m) atrium on the ground floor at the building's main entrance to the retail areas. The curving facade along the eastern end of the building is supposed to follow a curve in the Willamette River. Moda Tower also has an observation deck on the roof. With 400,000 square feet (37,000 m^{2}) of leasable space, it is the tenth largest office building in Portland.

== See also ==
- Architecture of Portland, Oregon
- List of tallest buildings in Portland, Oregon
