= Awning (sculpture) =

Sculpture in Portland, Oregon, U.S.

- The sculpture in 2015
- Year: 1976
- Type: Sculpture
- Medium: Aluminum
- Dimensions: 18 m (60 ft)
- Location: Portland, Oregon, United States; 45°30′43″N 122°40′44″W
- Website: douglassenft.com/works/awning/

Awning is an outdoor 1976 painted aluminum sculpture by Canadian artist Douglas Senft, located near Southwest 3rd Avenue and Southwest Market Street in downtown Portland, Oregon. The 60-foot (18 m) sculpture was selected and funded by the Portland Development Commission from more than 200 proposals in a request for art intended to "humanize the modern architecture" of the Portland Center. Senft was 26 years old when Awning was installed. It is part of the collection of the Regional Arts & Culture Council. The yellow-colored work is mounted to the side of 200 Market along a pedestrian trail that serves as an extension of Third Avenue.

== Reception ==
In 2011, Ben Waterhouse of Willamette Week called Awning an "eyesore" after realizing the sculpture was "not a garish and whimsical air vent, but a work of art". He wrote, "It doesn't help that there is no plaque to be found anywhere in the vicinity to indicate that the sculpture was designed by anyone but an anonymous metalworker. If the Portland Development Commission is going to buy art that looks like ductwork, it should at least be labeled as such. Or is the piece's anonymity intentional, and the indifference of unaware passers-by its real achievement? Oh, my head!"

== See also ==
- 1976 in art
