= Harrison Tower Apartments =

Apartment building in Portland, Oregon, U.S.

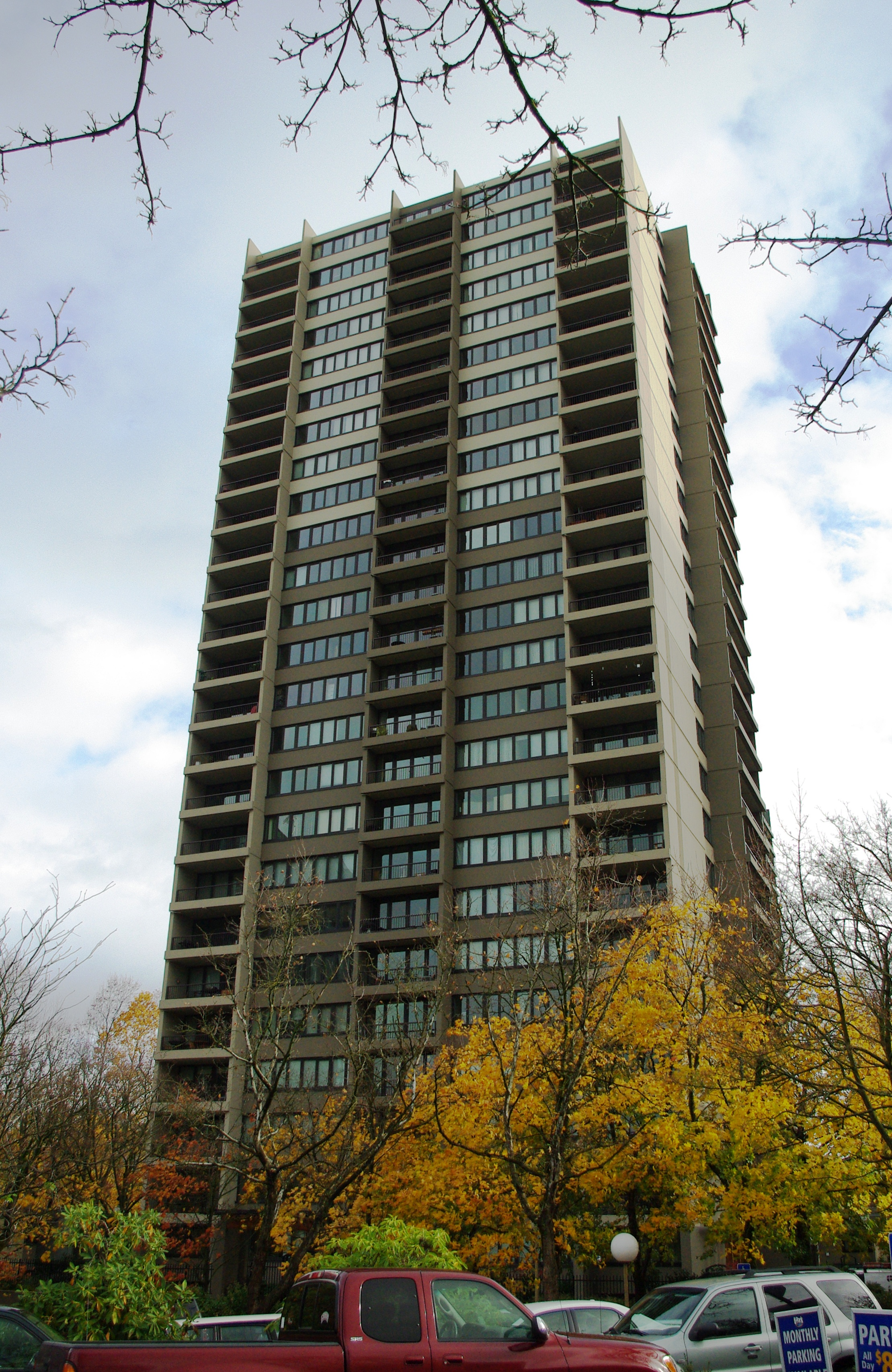

- Location within downtown Portland
- Former names: Tower 255; Portland Center Apartments II

General information
- Type: Apartment building
- Location: 222 SW Harrison Street; Portland, Oregon
- Coordinates: 45.50979°N 122.67940°W
- Owner: Sequoia Equities, Inc.
- Management: Sequoia Equities, Inc.

Design and construction
- Architect: Skidmore, Owings and Merrill

The Harrison Tower Apartments, West Tower, formerly the Portland Center Apartments II, is a building in downtown Portland, Oregon. Part of a three-building complex with a Mid-Century modernist design, the west building was the tallest in the city from its completion in 1965 until it was surpassed in 1969 by the Bank of California Tower. The complex was designed by Skidmore, Owings and Merrill.

The tower was built as an apartment building, and remained so for many years after its 1965 completion, but was converted into condominiums between 2005 and 2008 and renamed from the Portland Center Apartments to the Harrison Condominiums. However, following a subsequent sale of the complex, the owners continued leasing the units as apartments. Eventually, the name was changed to reflect this usage, becoming the Harrison Tower Apartments.
