= 5 MLK =

Building in Portland, Oregon, U.S.

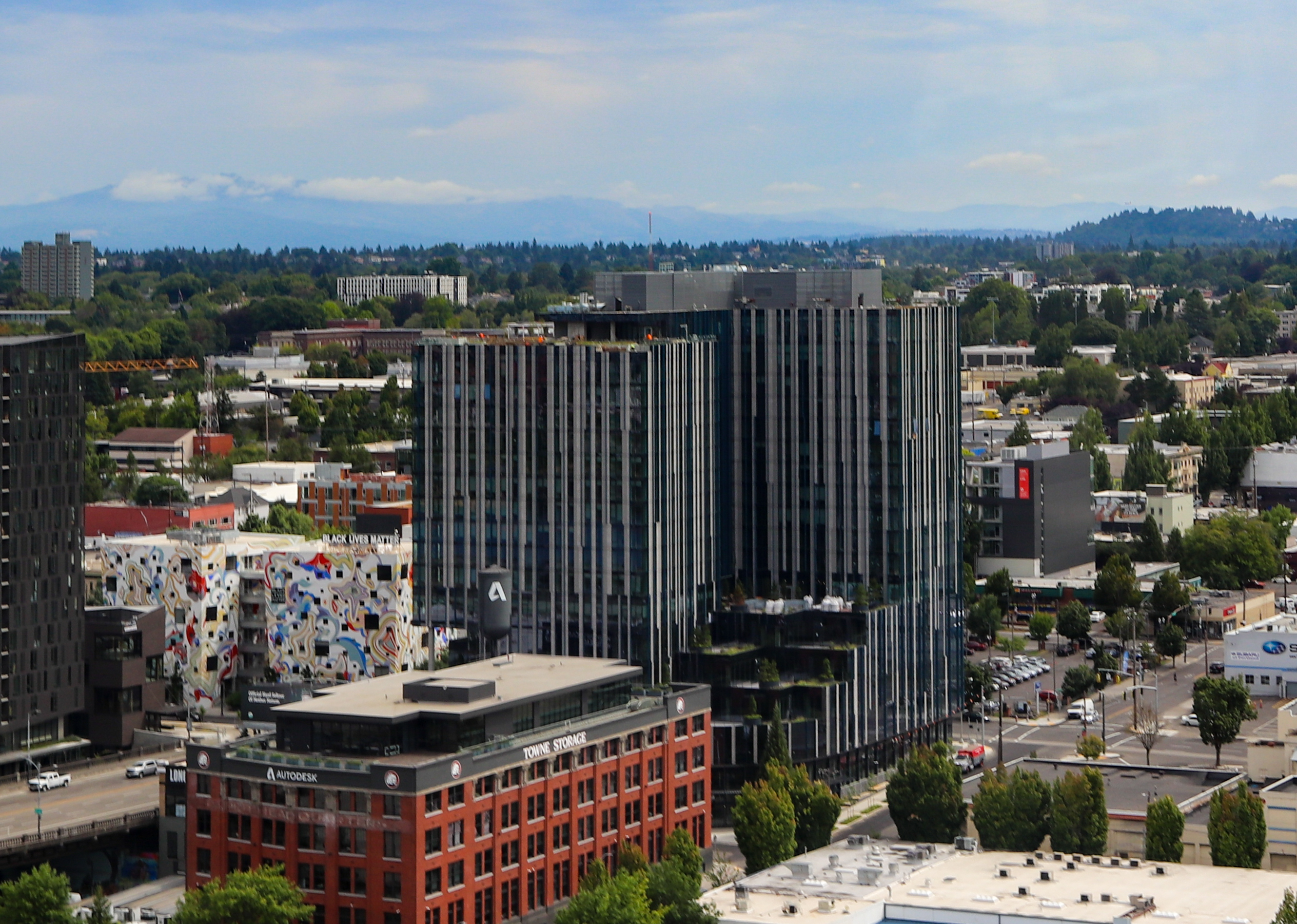
- 5 MLK, seen with the red-brick Blake McFall Company Building in the foreground
- Interactive map of the 5 MLK area

General information
- Location: Portland, Oregon, United States
- Coordinates: 45°31′21.2″N 122°39′44.2″W

5 MLK is a 200 feet (61 m) 17-story mixed-use apartment and office building in Portland, Oregon's Burnside Bridgehead area completed in 2020. It was designed by GREC Architects and built for Gerding Edlen.

== Description and history ==
The building is a full-block five-story podium topped with a twelve-story tower. It went under many rounds of design reviews in 2016 and 2017, A 2016 design showed the tower in "earth tone" panels and glass. Portland architecture blog said it was "design[ed] by committee". The final design was approved in mid-2017. 5 MLK opened in late 2020 offering high-end apartments and commercial spaces.

The site was previously home to buildings including a three-story quarter-block building constructed in approximately 1912 and historically called the Buckman Building. It was occupied by Fishels Furniture since 1947, which closed in 2016. That building was demolished in early 2018.
