= Riva on the Park =

Residential building in Portland, Oregon, U.S.

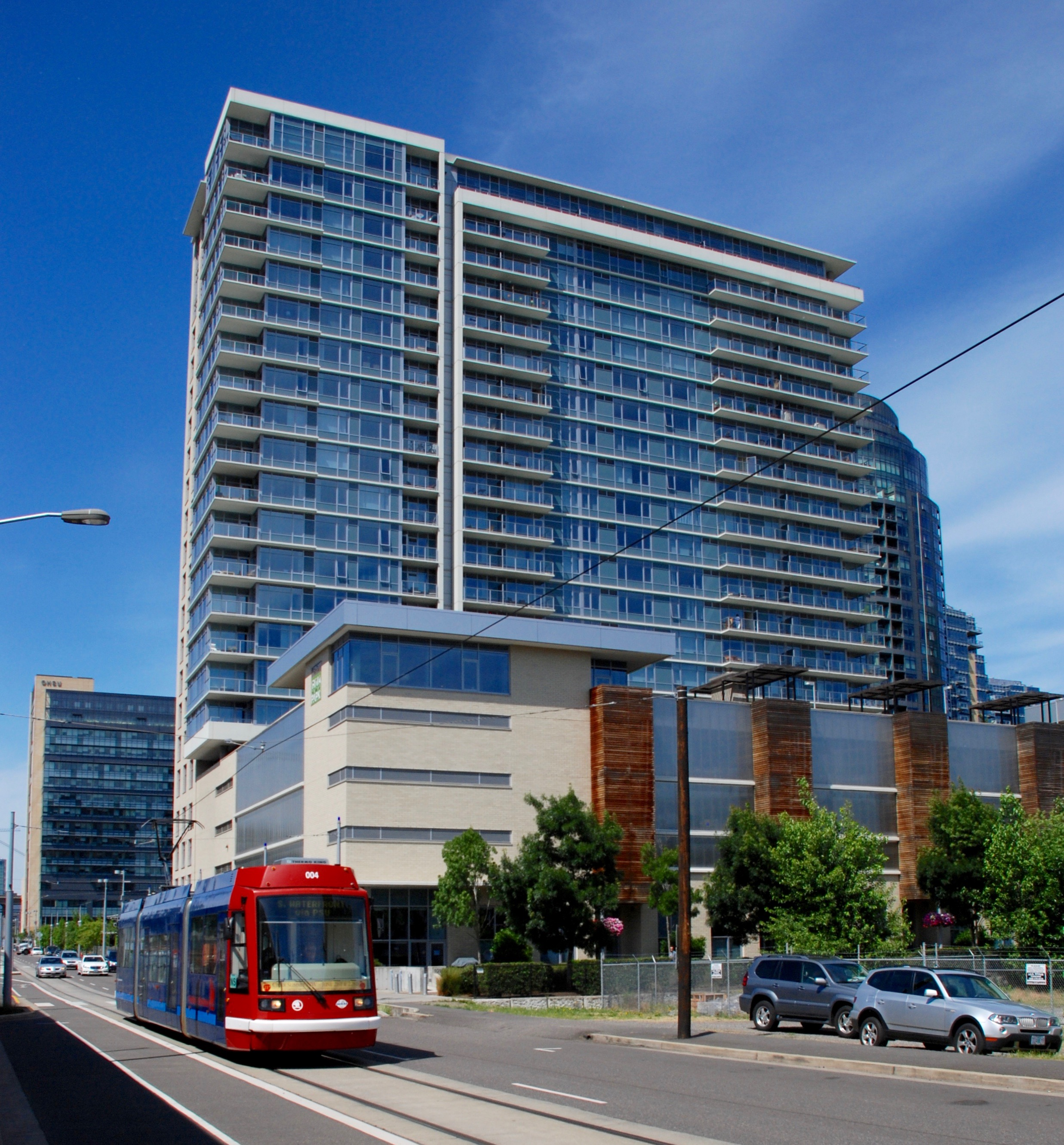
- Riva on the Park, a 22-story apartment building in Portland, Oregon's South Waterfront district, viewed from the south-southwest. In the foreground, a streetcar is southbound on Moody Avenue. In the background is the OHSU Center for Health and Healing, built in 2006.
- Interactive map of the Riva on the Park area

General information
- Location: Portland, Oregon, United States
- Coordinates: 45°29′46″N 122°40′17″W

Riva on the Park is a skyscraper in Portland, Oregon's South Waterfront district, in the United States.
