= Bank of America Center (Portland, Oregon) =

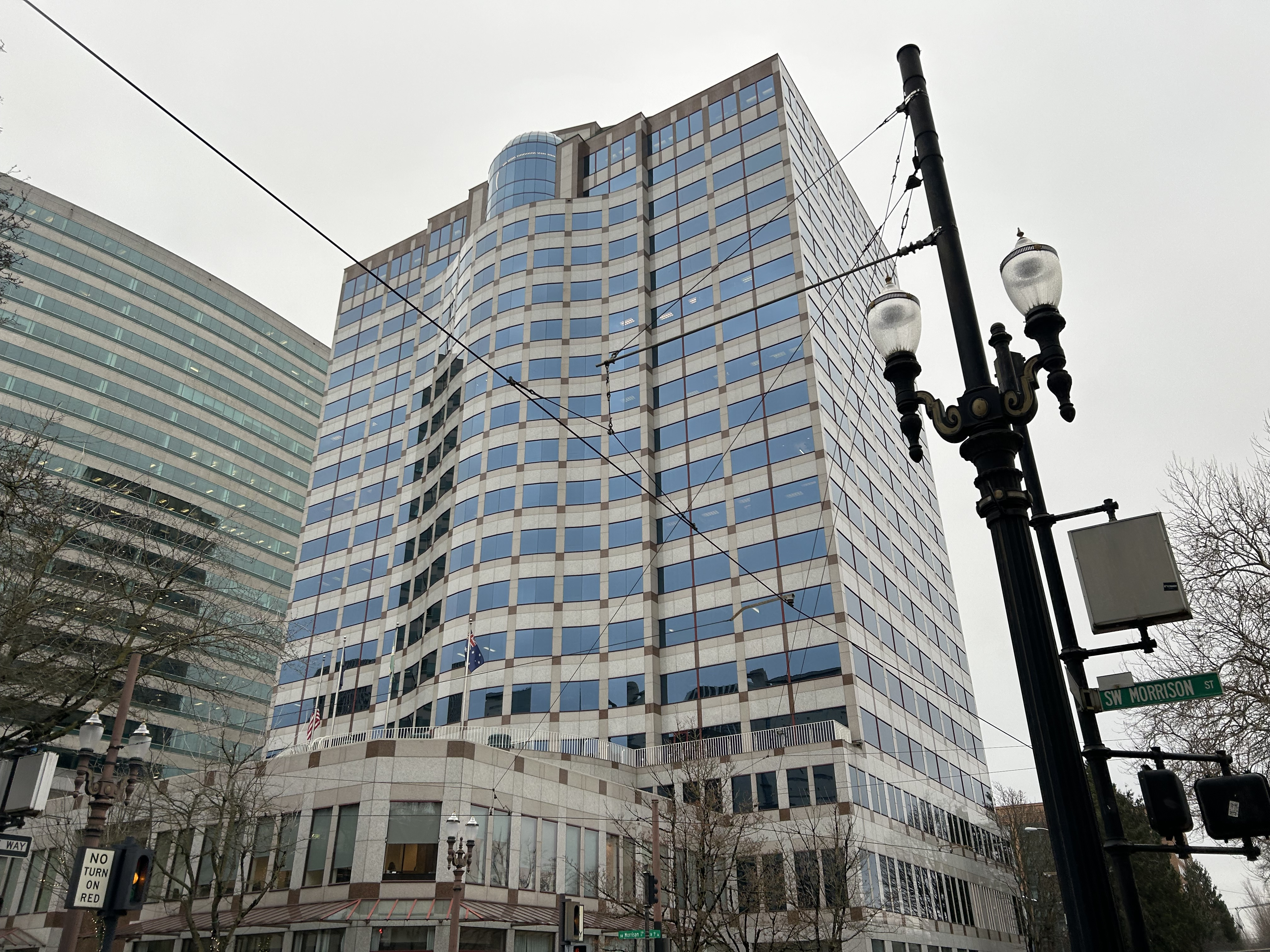
- The building in 2025
- Interactive map of the Bank of America Center area

General information
- Location: Portland, Oregon, United States
- Coordinates: 45.51823°N 122.67378°W
- Elevation: 35 feet (11 m)

The Bank of America Center, also known as the Bank of America Financial Center and One Financial Center, is located at 101–177 Southwest Morrison Street in Portland, Oregon, United States. Construction began in 1985 and was completed in 1987. The 18-story building has 350,000 feet of office space. It was designed by architect Greg Baldwin.
