= Liberty Centre =

Building in Portland, Oregon, U.S.

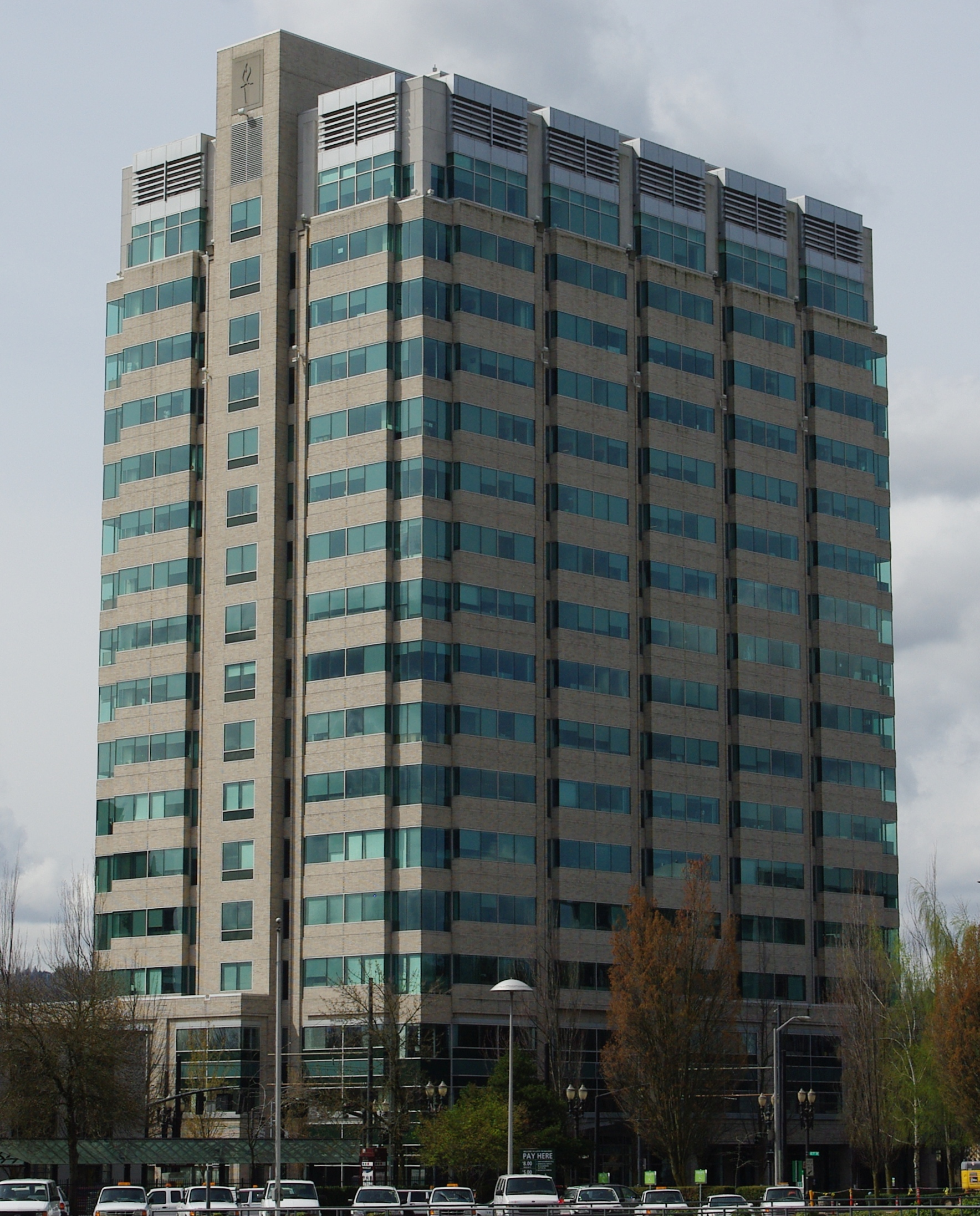
- The building in 2011
- Interactive map of the Liberty Centre area

General information
- Status: Completed
- Location: Lloyd District, 650 NE Holladay Street, Portland, OR, Portland, Oregon, United States
- Coordinates: 45.5289°N 122.6591°W
- Opened: 1997

Technical details
- Size: 285,000 square feet (26,500 m^{2})
- Floor count: 17

Liberty Centre, also known as One Liberty Centre, is a skyscraper located at 633 Northeast Liberty Place in Portland, Oregon's Lloyd District, in the United States. The 17-story tower was developed with Liberty Northwest Insurance Corporation, part of Liberty Mutual, creating the namesake for the building.

== History ==
Plans for the project were announced in 1996, with construction beginning in the spring of that year. The design was approved by the city in March of that year. The Ashforth Company developed the tower and adjacent parking structure with Liberty Northwest Insurance Corporation as part owner. Tenants in the 1990s included Liberty Mutual, Nacco Materials Handling Group Inc., and what was then KinderCare when it relocated its headquarters to Portland. Knowledge Universe acquired KinderCare in 2005 and moved its headquarters to the KinderCare space at Liberty Centre later that year.

Knowledge Universe renewed its lease in the building in 2014. There was a murder inside the building in October 2016 as part of a murder-suicide. Liberty Mutual left the building in 2022 where it had leased 97,000 square feet (9,000 m^{2}). Due to the collapse of value in the commercial real estate market caused by work from home transitions caused by the COVID 19 pandemic, the bank took possession of the tower in 2025, which then put the building up for sale.

== Details ==
Liberty Centre has 285,000 square feet (26,500 m^{2}) over 17-stories. GBD Architects designed the tower, with Glumac as the engineers. The lobby includes a large painting by Sol LeWitt, and the building has a MAX light rail stop on the same block.
