= Dossier (Portland, Oregon) =

Hotel in Portland, Oregon, U.S.

- Logo

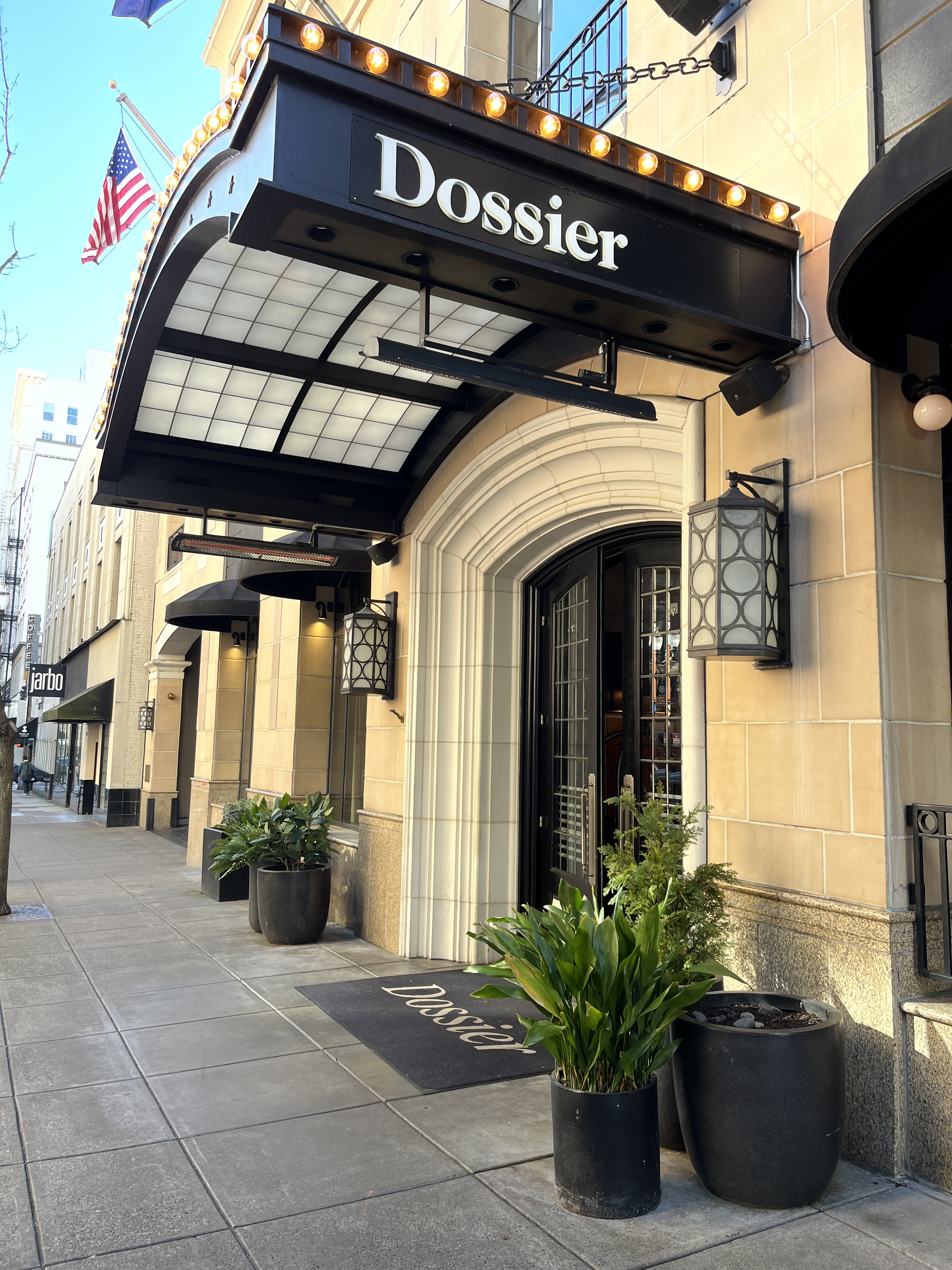
- The hotel's entrance, 2023
- Interactive map of the Dossier area

General information
- Location: 750 Southwest Alder Street, Portland, Oregon, United States
- Coordinates: 45°31′12.3″N 122°40′48.5″W
- Construction started: 1999; 27 years ago

Dossier is a multi-floor hotel at 750 Southwest Alder Street in downtown Portland, Oregon.

== History ==
Built in 1999 and renovated in 2011, the building was previously a Westin Hotel. Dossier opened on August 1, 2017. The hotel is operated by Pyramid Global Hospitality . Dossier provided guests access to beer and kombucha tastings, as of 2019, and hiking equipment, as of 2020.

== Restaurants ==
The building's "Old-World Italian" restaurant Omerta closed in November 2017, opening for only three months. Opal Bar continued to operate in the front room. The restaurant Rosa Rosa opened in the first floor in 2018, and closed during the COVID-19 pandemic.

The French restaurant Bistro Alder opened in September 2022. The menu has included French onion soup.
