= Pacific First Center =

Building in Portland, Oregon, U.S.

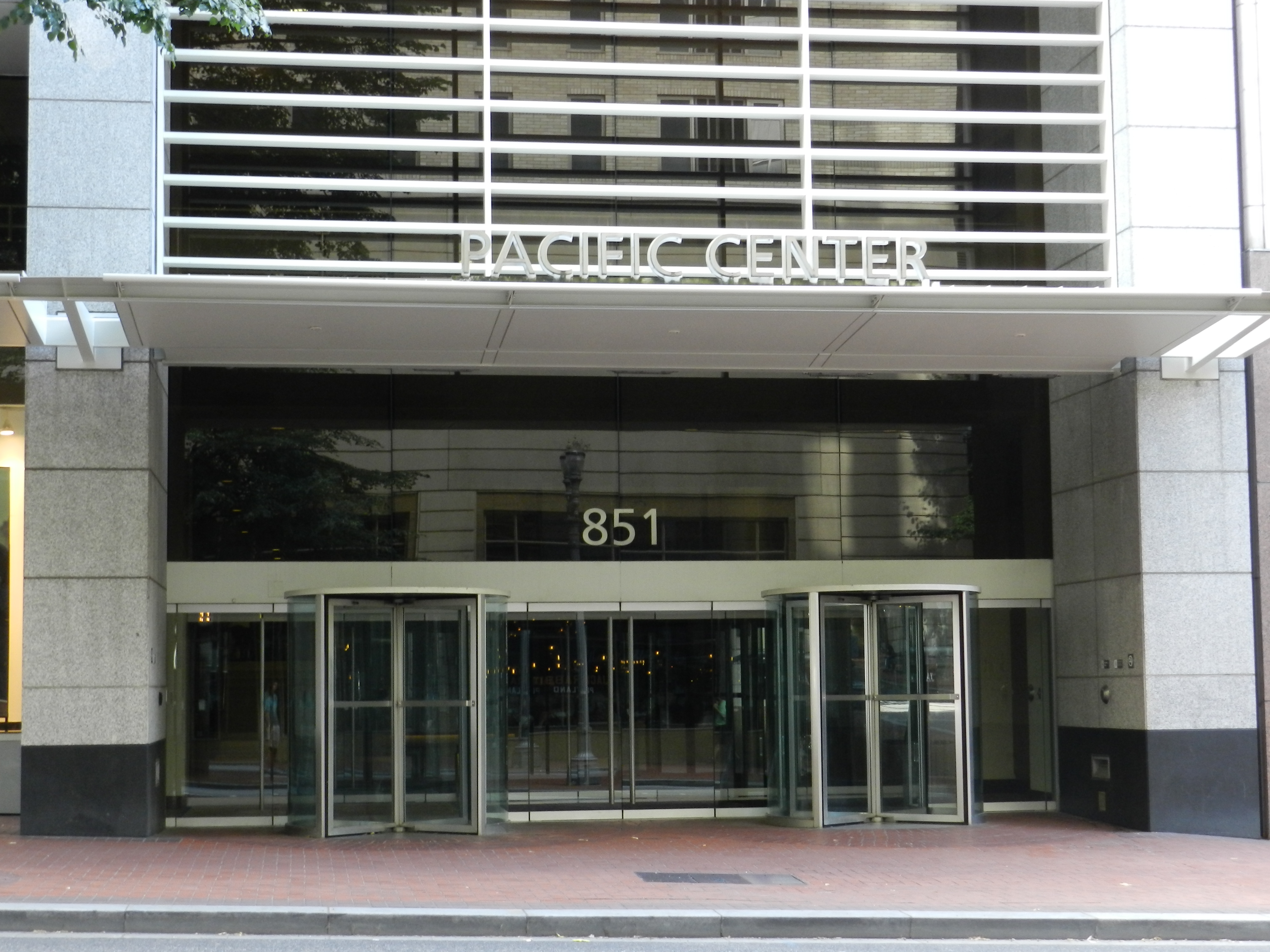
- The building's facade

- Location within Portland, Oregon

General information
- Type: High-rise building
- Location: 851 Southwest 6th Avenue, Portland, Oregon, United States
- Coordinates: 45.518028°N 122.679268°W
- Opened: 1981
- Owner: Schnitzer Properties

Technical details
- Floor count: 16

The Pacific First Center is a 16-story high-rise building located at 851 Southwest 6th Avenue in Portland, Oregon, United States. Construction was completed in 1981. The building is owned by Schnitzer Properties.
