= Metropolitan Condos =

Building in Portland, Oregon, U.S.

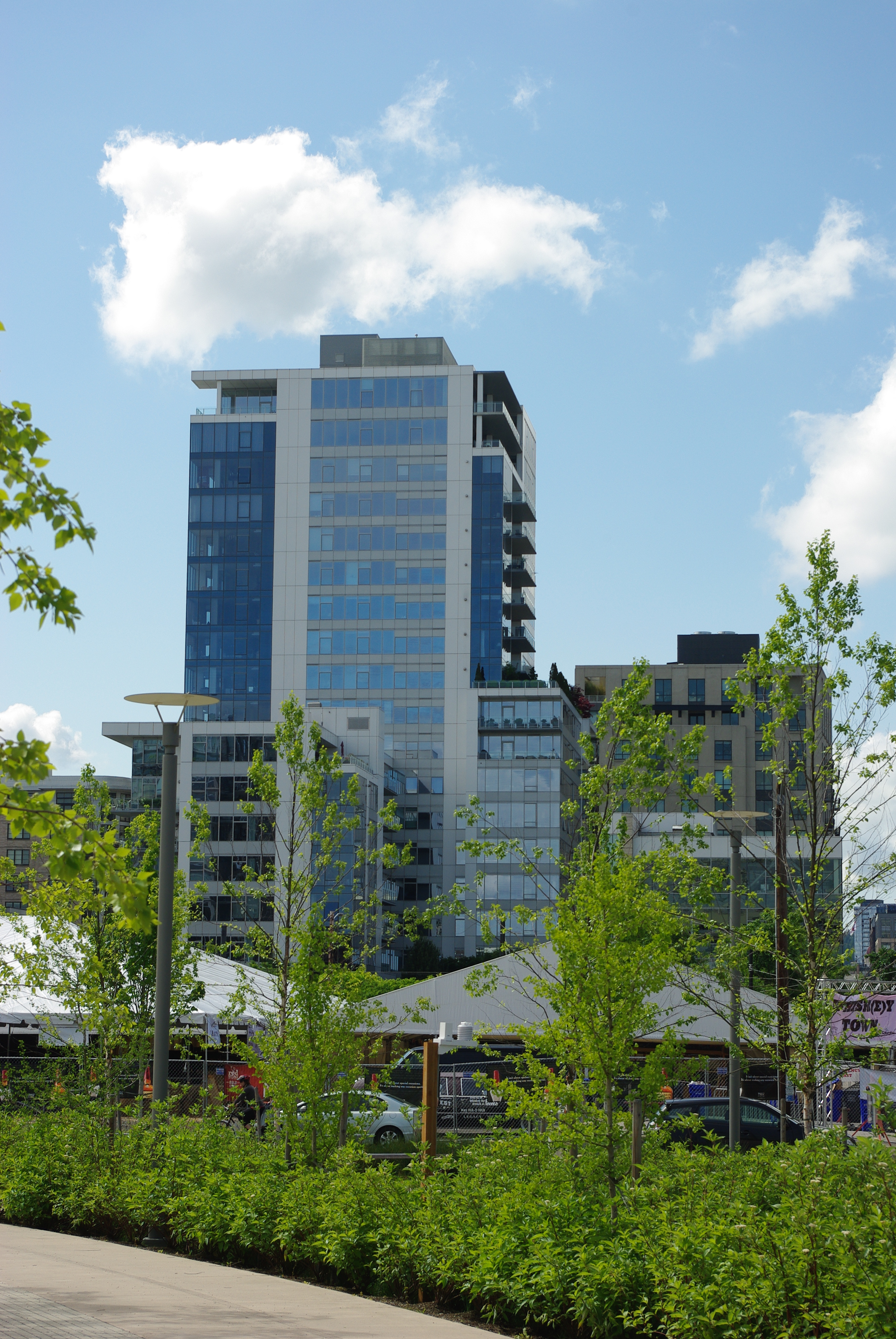
- The building in 2014

- Location within Portland, Oregon

General information
- Location: Portland, Oregon, United States
- Coordinates: 45.5302°N 122.6816°W

The Metropolitan Condos, also known as the Block 9 Condominiums, is a skyscraper located at 1001 Northwest Lovejoy Street in Portland, Oregon's Pearl District, in the United States. Construction began in 2005 and was completed in 2007.
