= Atwater Place =

Building in Portland, Oregon, U.S.

Coordinates: 45°29′47″N 122°40′07″W

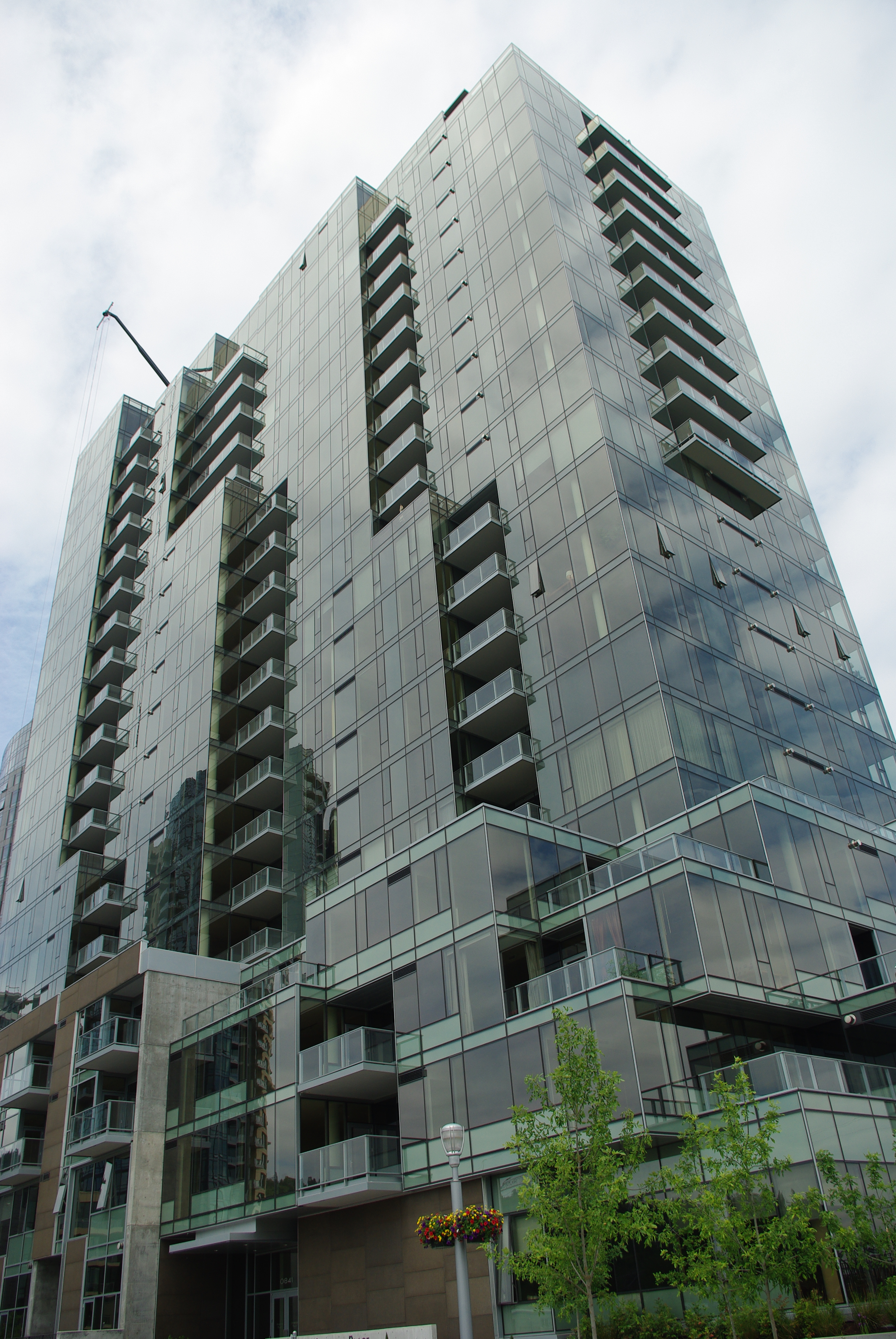
The building in 2009

Atwater Place is a high-rise condominium tower in Portland, Oregon's South Waterfront district, in the United States. It is managed by the Atwater Place Condominiums Owners Association. All units are privately owned.
