= The Ardea =

Residential skyscraper in Portland, Oregon, U.S.

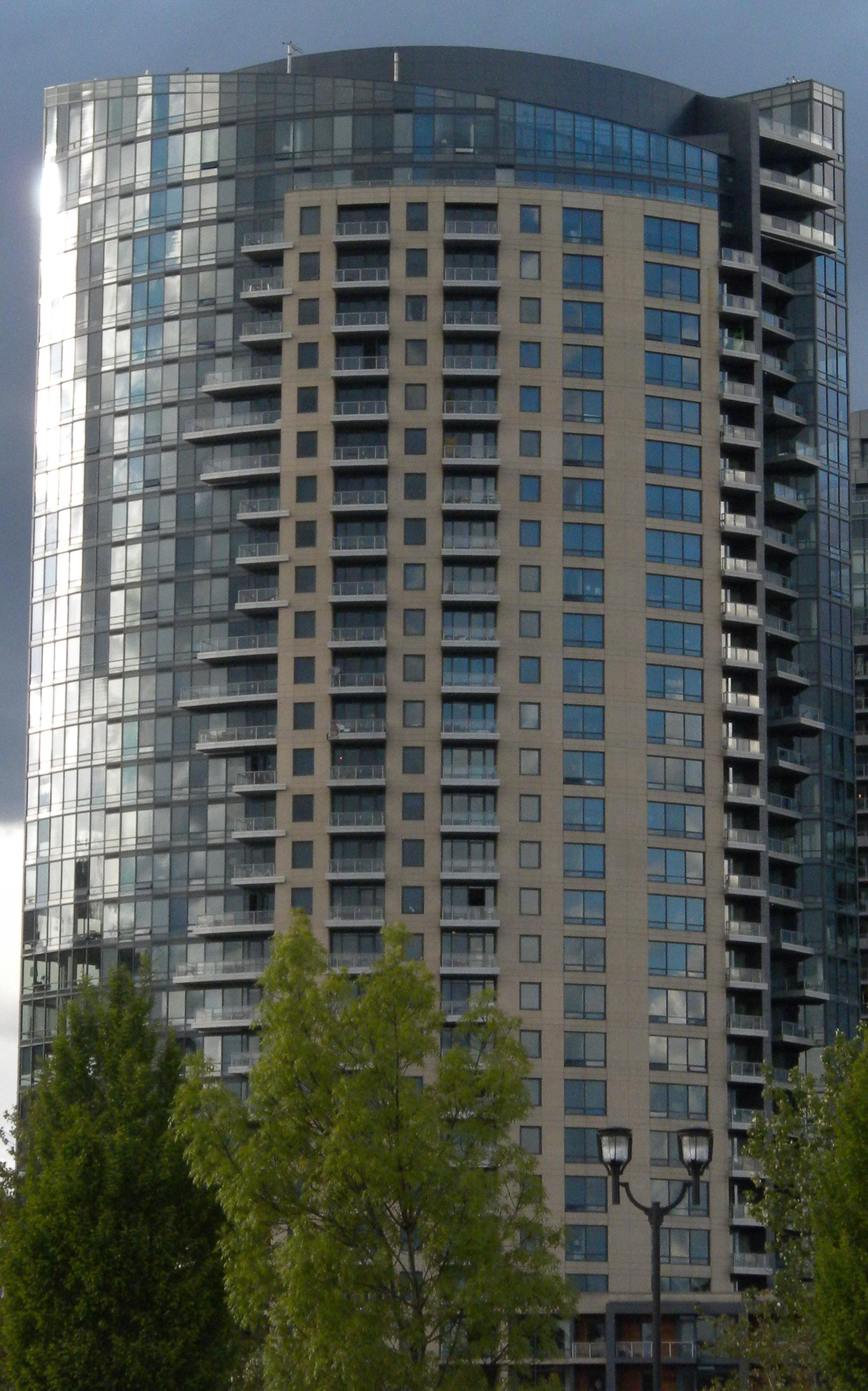

- Location within Portland, Oregon
- Former names: 3720
- Alternative names: Block 38

General information
- Type: Residential apartments
- Location: 3720 SW Bond Avenue; Portland, Oregon
- Coordinates: 45.4959°N 122.6704°W
- Construction started: 2006
- Completed: 2009
- Cost: US$160 million
- Owner: Block 38 Investors, LLC
- Management: Riverstone Residential Group

Height
- Roof: 99.06 m (325.0 ft)

Technical details
- Floor count: 30
- Lifts/elevators: 5

Design and construction
- Architect: GBD Architects
- Developer: Gerding Edlen
- Structural engineer: KPFF
- Main contractor: Hoffman Construction

Other information
- Number of units: 279 Units

The Ardea, formerly 3720, is a 30-story 99.06 m (325.0 ft) apartment skyscraper in the South Waterfront district of Portland, Oregon. The building was completed in March 2009, however was turned over in phases allowing occupancy beginning in August 2008. The Ardea was developed by Gerding Edlen, designed by GBD Architects, and constructed by Hoffman Construction. The building was initially designed to be a condominium building but was converted to apartments after the Portland housing and condominium supply outstripped demand. The Ardea joins John Ross Tower as the seventh tallest building in Portland.

The Ardea consists of 30 floors including an adjacent five-story building. The property consists of 323 units, 380 underground parking spaces and over 16,000 ft^{2} (1,500 m^{2}) of retail space on the ground floor.

The exterior cladding of the building is constructed with a variety of materials including window wall, curtain wall, precast concrete panels, and a metal cladding system. The Ardea received an Excellence in Concrete Award in 2009 for the unique application of precast that runs up the exterior of the building in two vertical bands on both the north and south faces. This building received LEED Gold status in the U.S. Green Building Council's Leadership in Energy and Environmental Design (LEED) program.

== Pricing and occupancy ==
As the housing market slowed in 2008, nearly 3,000 luxury condos were for sale. In October 2008, 50 of the 323 residences in the Ardea had been leased. In March 2009, prices for a 750 sq ft (70 m^{2}) 1 bedroom started at US$1350 per month and 2-bed-1-bath units were priced between US$2,260 and US$2,650 per month.

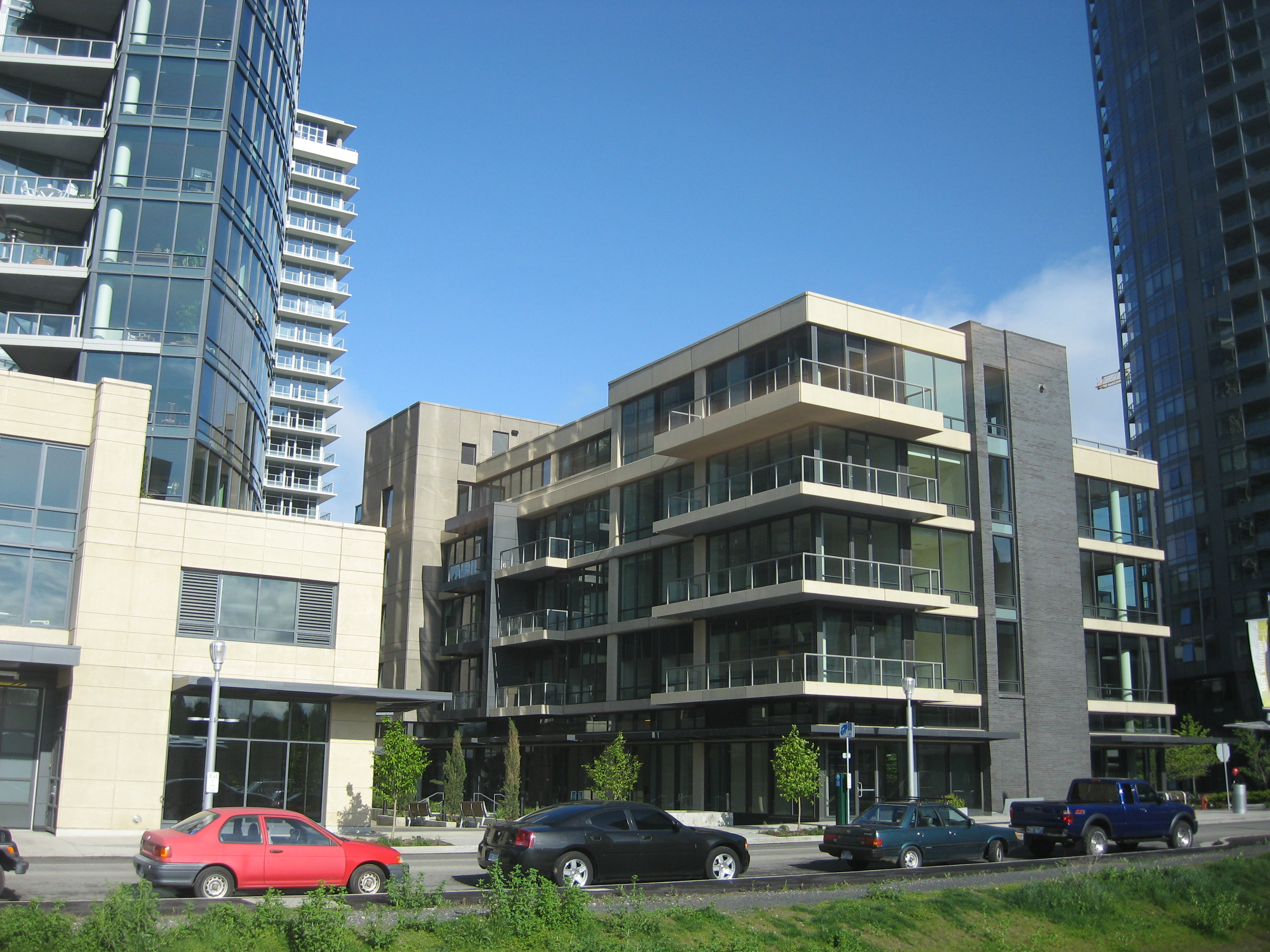
The Sidecar of The Ardea, a 5-story independent building

== See also ==
- Architecture in Portland, Oregon
- List of tallest buildings in Portland, Oregon
