= Railway Exchange Building =

Railway Exchange Building may refer to the following:

- Railway Exchange Building (Chicago), Illinois, U.S., also called the Santa Fe Building, an office building
- Railway Exchange Building (Muskogee, Oklahoma), U.S., an eight-story office building
- Railway Exchange Building (Portland, Oregon), U.S., an historic building on the National Register of Historic Places
- Railway Exchange Building (St. Louis), Missouri, U.S., a 21-story office building
