= Charles J. and Elsa Schnabel House =

Historic building in Portland, Oregon, U.S.

- U.S. National Register of Historic Places
- U.S. Historic district – Contributing property
- Portland Historic Landmark
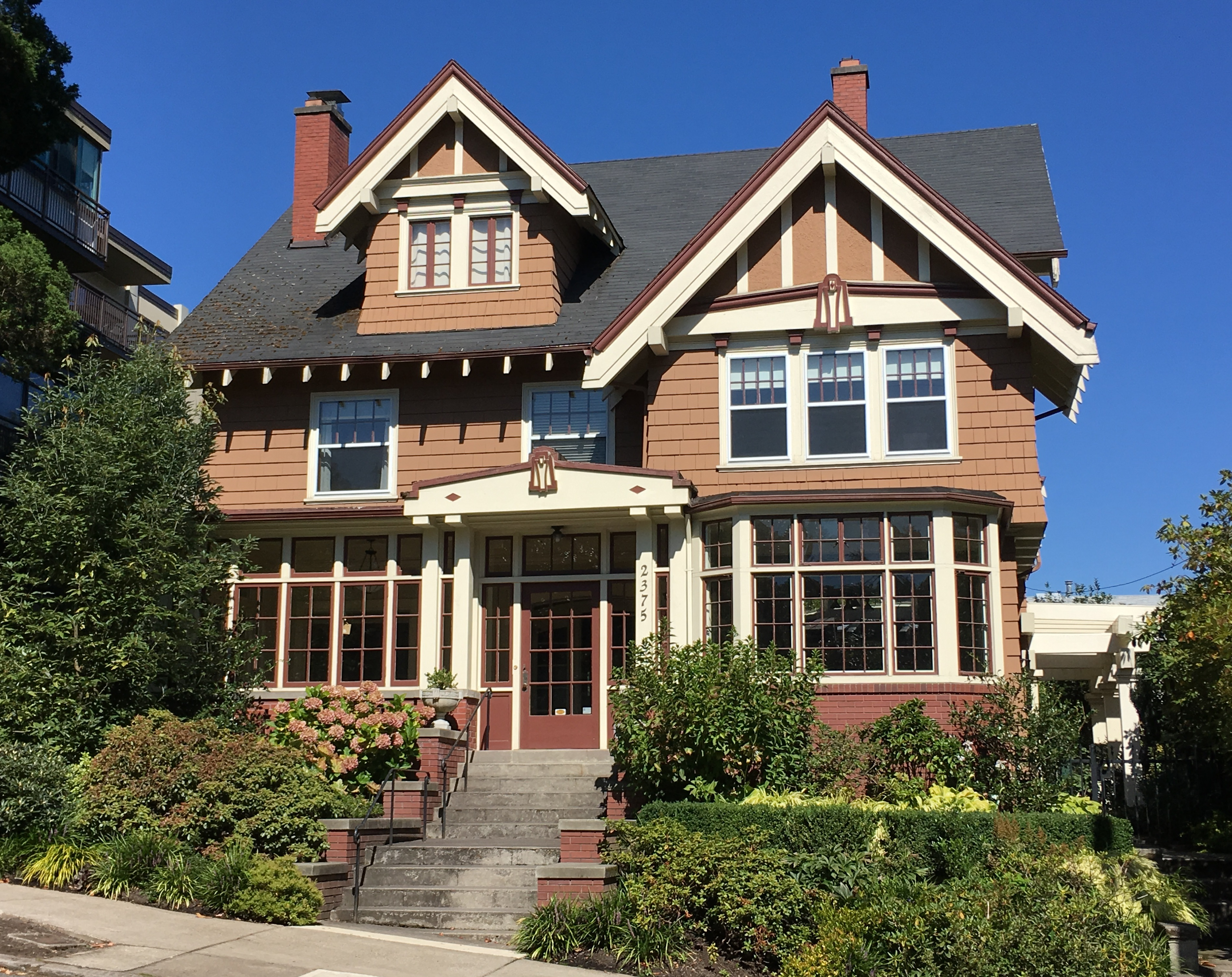
- The Schnabel House in 2016

- Location within Portland, Oregon
- Location: 2375 SW Park Place; Portland, Oregon
- Coordinates: 45°31′17″N 122°41′59″W
- Built: 1907
- Architect: William C. Knighton
- Architectural style: Arts and Crafts
- Part of: King's Hill Historic District (ID91000039)
- NRHP reference No.: 87001496
- Added to NRHP: September 8, 1987

The Charles J. and Elsa Schnabel House is a house located in southwest Portland, Oregon listed on the National Register of Historic Places. Its location on 2375 SW Park Place is in the King's Hill section of Goose Hollow.

Two large windows installed in the tradesman entrance (verified by Bosco and Milligan) were originally from the (Ferdinand) Smith Family Mansion in what is now Lair Hill Park. Two other sets of modern geometric art glass windows in the dining room and staircase landing are attributed to Povey Brothers based on inspection by Polly Povey Thompson, daughter of designer David Povey.

== See also ==
- National Register of Historic Places listings in Southwest Portland, Oregon
