= Huber's =

Restaurant in Portland, Oregon, U.S.

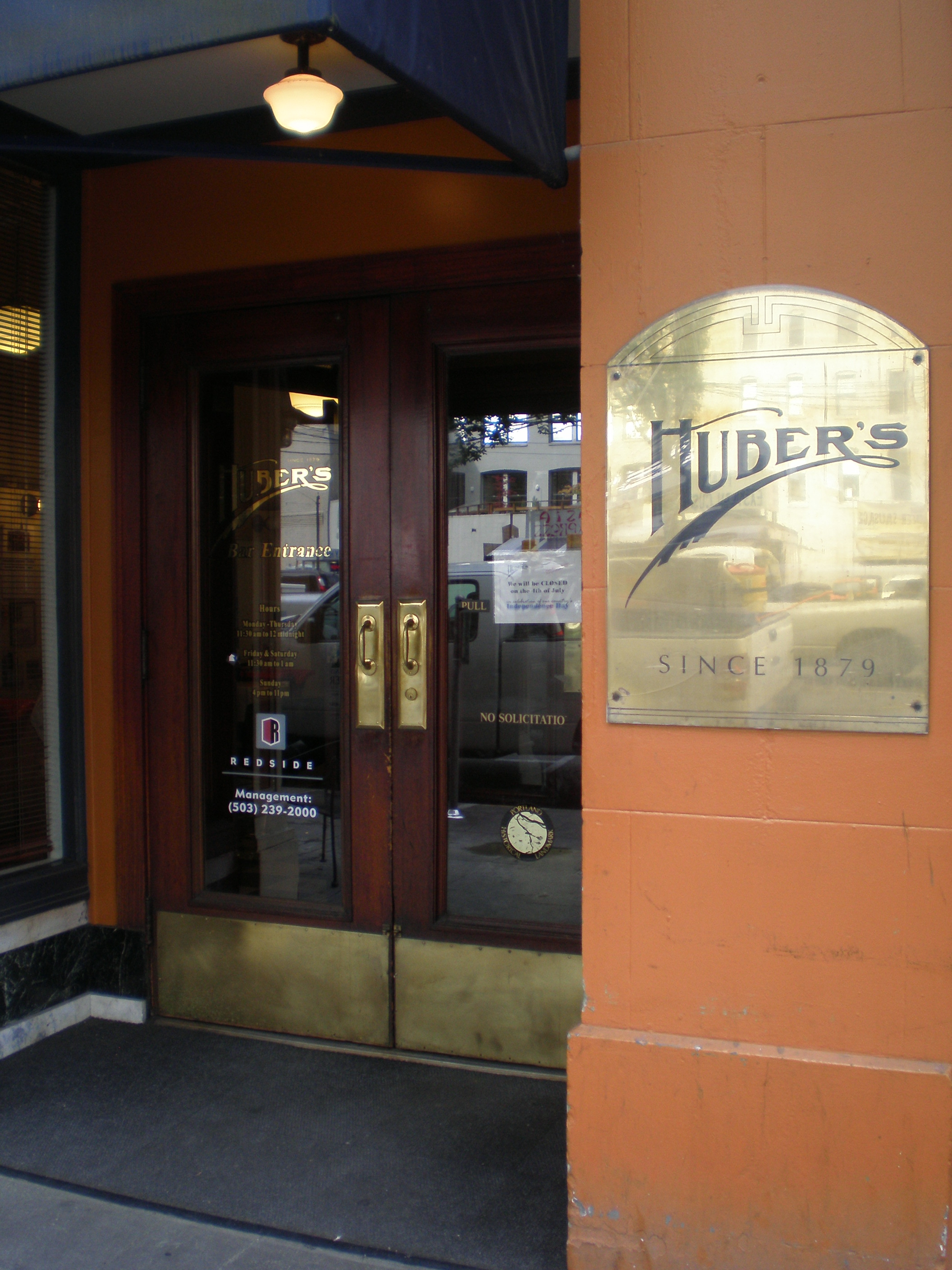
- Entrance to Huber's in 2011
- Interactive map of Huber's

Restaurant information
- Established: 1879
- Owners: David H, James, David A, and Tim Louie
- Location: 411 Southwest 3rd Avenue, Portland, Oregon, 97204, United States
- Website: www.hubers.com

Huber's (originally The Bureau Saloon) is a restaurant in Portland, Oregon that bills itself as the city's oldest restaurant, having been established in 1879. Known for its turkey dinner and Spanish coffee, Huber's is often listed as a recommended restaurant to eat at in Portland. The establishment has also been featured in a film by Gus Van Sant. Huber's is within the Railway Exchange Building (now known as the Oregon Pioneer Building).

== Description ==
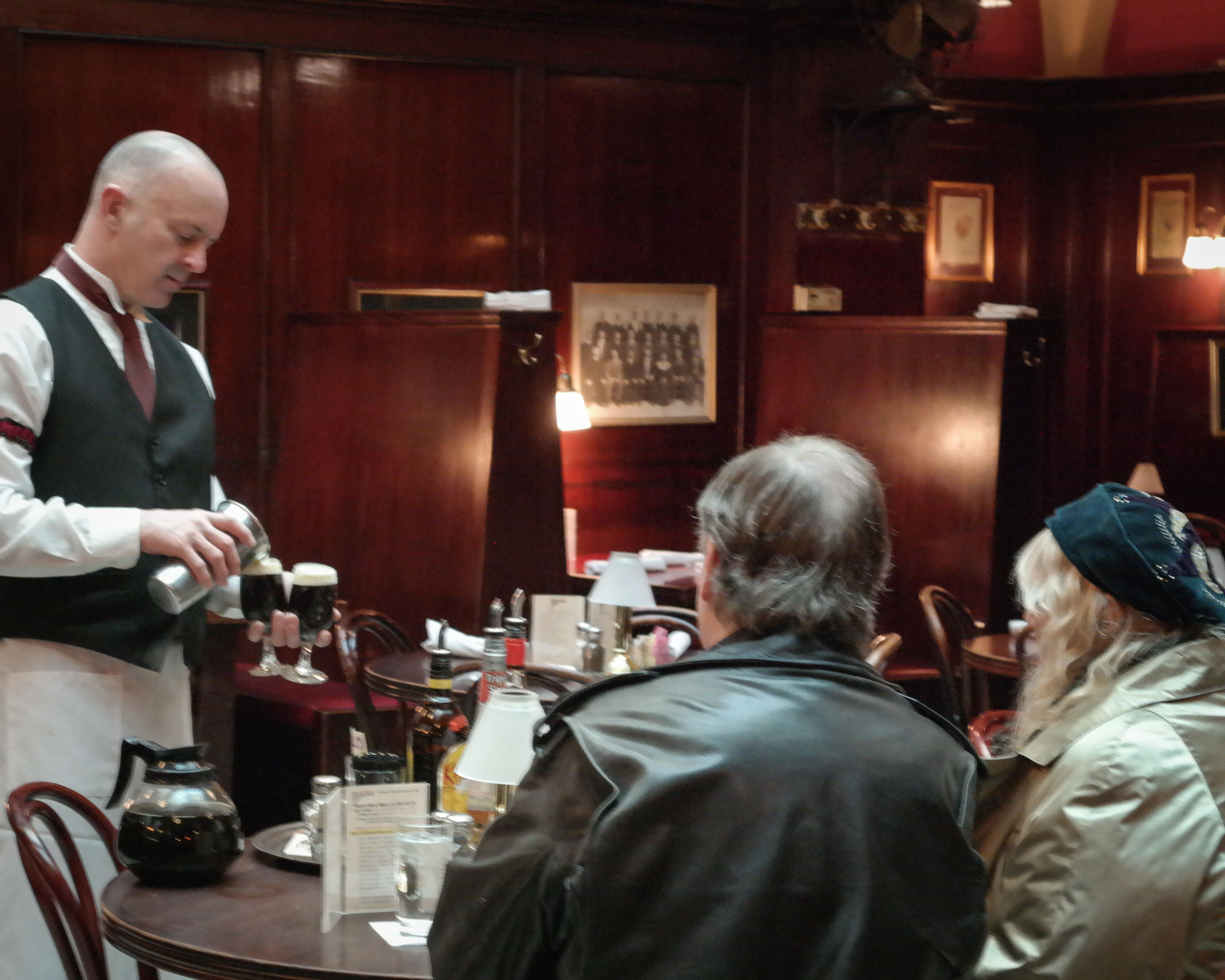
Bartender preparing Spanish coffee

Located in Portland's historic Pioneer Building, Huber's contains "arched stained-glass skylights, mahogany paneling and terrazzo flooring". Original fixtures such as spittoons, overhead lights, a pewter wine stand, and cash registers, fans, and operable clocks made of brass still remain, "reminders of its rich history". The restaurant's yellow and amber skylight was made by the Povey Brothers Studio.

Continuing with the tradition of preparing turkey dinners since the 1800s, Huber's prepares around 100 pounds of turkey each day to make "at least a dozen different dishes including the classic turkey dinner, hot and cold sandwiches, turkey marsala, cordon bleu, piccata, gumbo, drumsticks and wings, and Chinese barbecue turkey." Turkey-related foods that failed to catch on with patrons included "turkey coffee" (a combination of Wild Turkey bourbon, coffee and whipped cream) and an "Americanized" version of "turkey giblet chop suey". Spanish coffee has become the signature drink of Huber's, introduced by Jim Louie after "stealing" the idea from a bar in Milwaukie known as Fernwood Inn. Spanish coffee is made tableside with "great flair" and consists of rum, triple sec, Kahlúa, coffee, whipped cream, and nutmeg. In 1990, Huber's earned the distinction as the largest user of Kahlúa in the United States by an independent restaurant.

== History ==
Huber's bills itself as the oldest restaurant in Portland, having been established in 1879 as The Bureau Saloon at the corner of 1st and Alder in downtown Portland. The name of the establishment changed to its current form after Frank Huber purchased The Bureau Saloon. Throughout its history, the restaurant has occupied four separate locations, settling in the Pioneer Building (its current location) shortly after it was built in 1910. During this time, Huber's was a saloon with a bar and spittoons where "downtown professionals spat their chewing tobacco".

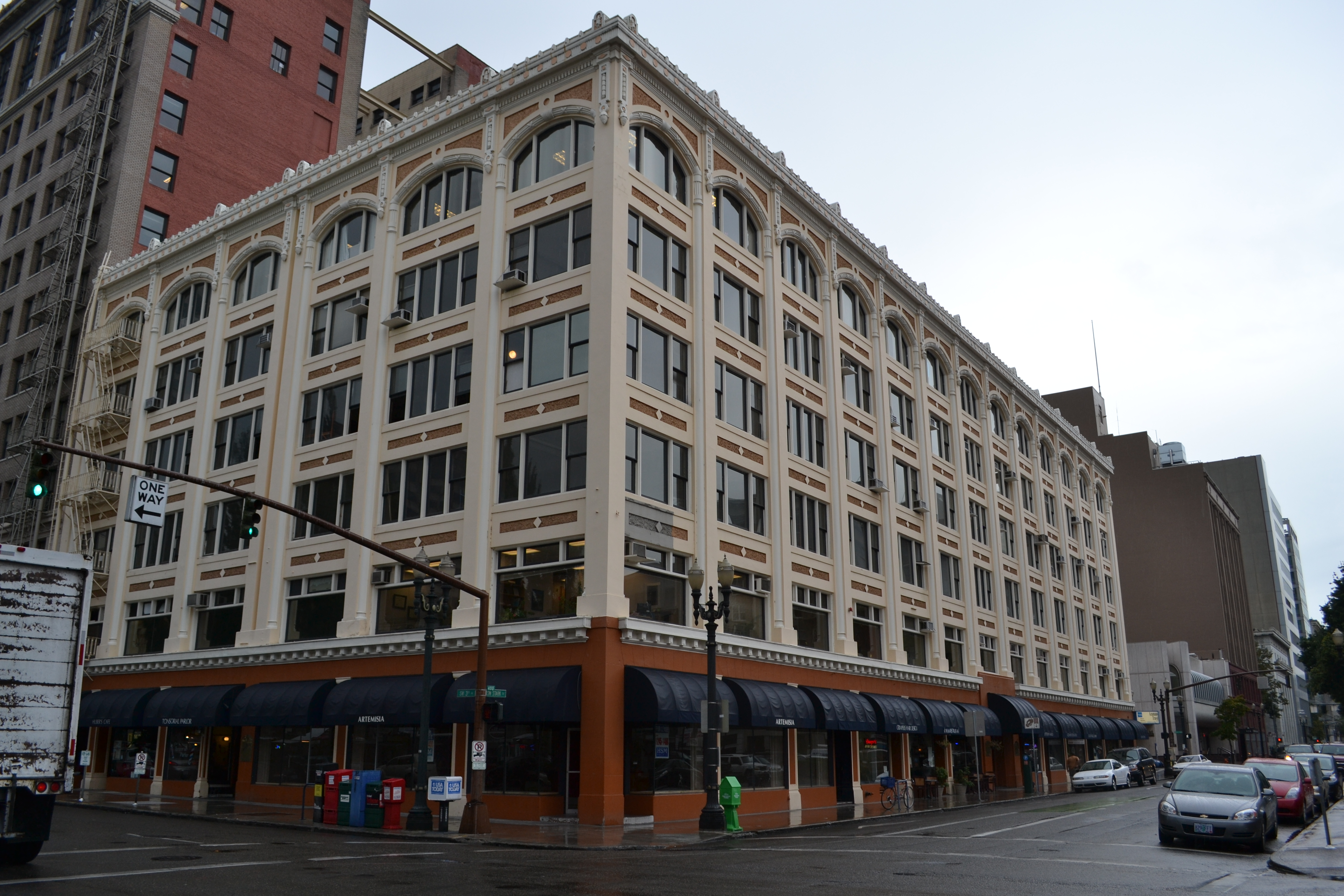
Oregon Pioneer Building, SW Third and Stark

After Huber died in 1912, Jim Louie took over management of the establishment. Louie, a stowaway Chinese immigrant, was the cook that helped to popularize the turkey dinners that Huber's is still known for today. During Prohibition, the saloon was converted into a restaurant and speakeasy so that food and alcoholic drinks could continue to be served. A few years after Louie's death, his nephew Andrew became the sole proprietor of Huber's in 1952. In 1960, Andrew introduced his eleven-year-old son James Kai Louie ("Jim") to the business, who eventually became an owner of the restaurant. David and Lucille Louie also became owners with the passing of Andrew in 1988 and his wife Amy in 1990. When Jim died in July of 2025, his share of the restaurant passed to his three sons, beginning the fouth generation of ownership by the same family. Jim's middle son, James Christopher Louie, became the new president of Huber's Inc in September of 2025.

The Railway Exchange Building and Huber's Restaurant were added to the National Register of Historic Places on March 13, 1979. In 1990, Portland Mayor Vera Katz officially made July 24th, "Huber's Day," in celebration of the restaurant's 116th birthday.

The restaurant's iconic bar was featured as a jazz club in the movie Men of Honor in 2000. It was again used for filming scenes in 2013 for the Grimm_(TV_series). In 2010, Huber's was featured as a stop on the "Sweet Cakes, Long Journey" walking tour, which explores the history of Portland's Chinatown, not for its food but for being owned by the same Chinese family for multiple generations. The restaurant's bar can also be seen in the upcoming Criminal_(TV_series). Huber's is featured prominently on the game board and as a property for purchase, in the Portland Edition of Monopoly_(game) released in November 2025.

== Reception ==
Brooke Jackson-Glidden included the Spanish coffee in Eater Portland's 2024 overview of "iconic" Portland dishes.

== See also ==
- National Register of Historic Places listings in South and Southwest Portland, Oregon
