= List of Washburne Historic District walking tour houses =

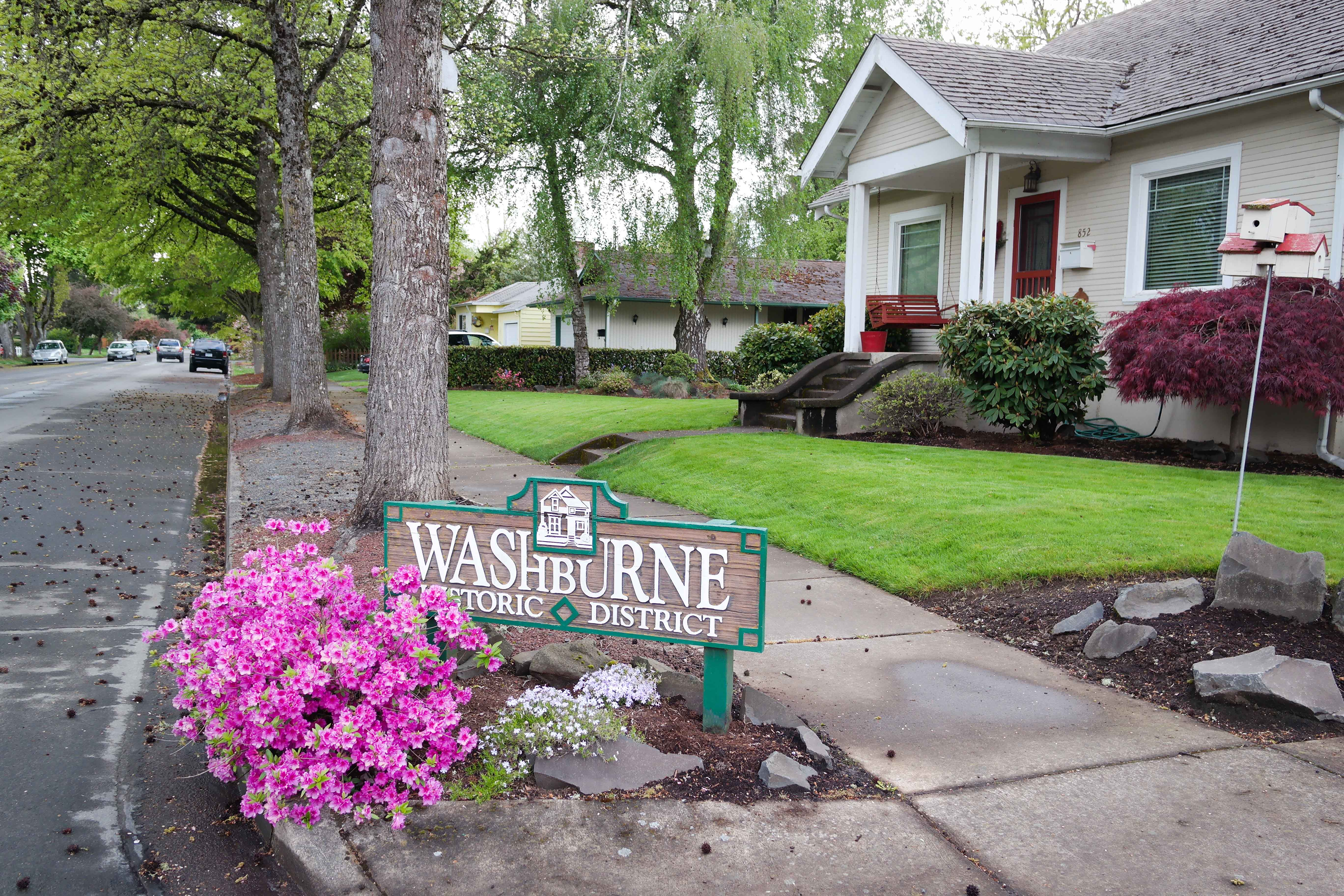
Entering the Washburne Historic District in Springfield, Oregon

The following list includes stops on the Walking Tour Guide prepared by Maren Tomblin and published by the Washburne Neighborhood Association in Springfield, Oregon. Funding for the guide was provided by the Springfield Historic Commission and by the National Park Service.

The Washburne Historic District was established in 1984 and added to the National Register of Historic Places in 1987. The district includes roughly 34 blocks of working class houses constructed between the 1890s and the 1940s. The district also includes a few larger residences. Many houses are named either for the original owner or for an early resident. All of the 27 stops on the walking tour are named, and the tour includes an early store, a fire house, and a hospital.

No.	Image	Year	Name and style	Address	Notes
1		1920	Flanery House; Colonial Revival	315 5th Street; 44.048174°N 123.019265°W	Built for Floyd and Gertrude Flanery, drugstore owners
2		1889	Fischer House early bungalow	329 5th Street; 44.048436°N 123.019367°W	Built by C.E. Fischer of Fischer-Boutin Lumber Co.
3		1923	Rebhan House bungalow	448 5th Street; 44.049548°N 123.019683°W	Built for Dr. W.C. Rebhan
4		1900	Seavey House foursquare	448 D Street; 44.049851°N 123.019721°W	Built by George Perkins and named for Jess Seavey, a hop farm owner.
5		1920	McMurray Store bungalow	521 5th Street; 44.050036°N 123.019336°W	Built by George Perkins. Also known as Edwards Market.
6		1923	Moore House bungalow	535 E Street; 44.050418°N 123.018736°W	Designed by John Hunzicker and named for Rev. James Moore.
7		1913	Lepley House bungalow	506 F Street; 44.051586°N 123.019228°W	Built by the Lepley Brothers
8		1920	Dillon House homestead style	546 F Street; 44.051574°N 123.018434°W	Named for Dillon, an early resident and millworker.
9		1909	J.H. Seavey House bungalow	638 6th Street; 44.051194°N 123.018396°W	Named for John and Alice Seavey.
10		1900	Old Fire House bungalow	636 F Street; 44.051563°N 123.017481°W	The fire station occupied this location after 1910. The fire chief lived upstairs, and two horse carts were kept in the station below.
11		1914	General Hospital bungalow	846 F Street; 44.051547°N 123.014373°W	Separately listed on the NRHP: #83002159
12		1924	Eby House bungalow	852 E Street; 44.050697°N 123.014134°W	Built for B.F. Eby
13		1906	McCracken House; Queen Anne	804 D Street; 44.049812°N 123.015184°W	Built by T.J. McCracken
14		1912	Meacham House bungalow	832 D Street; 44.049808°N 123.014657°W	Remodeled by Chauncy Meacham about 1924
15		1910	Smith Mountjoy House pyramid cottage	870 C Street; 44.048902°N 123.014158°W	Named for longtime resident Smith Mountjoy.
16		1910	Cox House vernacular	406 8th Street; 44.04896°N 123.015553°W	Built for Joseph and Sarah Cox
17		1908	Catching House; Dutch Colonial	346 7th Street; 44.048644°N 123.016991°W	Built for George Catching
18		1930	Stearmer House bungalow	656 D Street; 44.049822°N 123.017052°W	Named for Roy Stearmer
19		1912	McKlin House bungalow	606 D Street; 44.049816°N 123.018074°W	Designed and built by Merton McKlin.
20		1924	May House bungalow	546 D Street; 44.049831°N 123.018536°W	Built by Lawrence May
21		1912	Rychard House bungalow	607 D Street; 44.049562°N 123.018037°W	Named for Chauncey and Leatha Rychard
22		1916	Ebbert Church Parsonage; Queen Anne	530 C Street; 44.048945°N 123.018863°W	
23		1907	Perkins House foursquare	346 D Street; 44.049812°N 123.020987°W	Named for George Perkins and family.
24		1905	Ebbett House bungalow	644 4th Street; 44.051258°N 123.020923°W	Named for Walter and Lydia Ebbett
25		1890	Innis House; Queen Anne	637 B Street; 44.047823°N 123.017478°W	Built by master carpenter John Innis
26		1900	Kessey House bungalow	858 A Street; 44.04719°N 123.014201°W	Named for Orville Kessey
27		1915	Coffin House; Dutch Colonial	922 B Street; 44.048062°N 123.013461°W	Named for J. Wilbur Coffin and family.
