= Congress Hotel =

Congress Hotel may refer to:

- Congress Plaza Hotel, hotel in Chicago
- Canfield Casino and Congress Park, former hotel in Saratoga Springs
- Congress Hotel (Portland, Oregon), demolished hotel in Portland
- Hotel Congress, historic building in Tucson
