= Aimee Gorham =

Aimee Spencer Gorham (April 9, 1883 - November 29, 1973) was an artist known for wood marquetry murals and stained glass work in the northwestern United States. Her work was exhibited at the 1939 World's Fair and can be found at the Portland Art Museum, Oregon State University, Timberline Lodge, and numerous public buildings in Oregon. Gorham was also named an honorary member of the American Institute of Architects.

== Early life and education ==
Aimee Gorham was born in St. Paul, Minnesota on April 9, 1883, to parents Anna Elizabeth Spencer and Charles H. Spencer. Her family, including three sisters and a brother, moved to Portland, Oregon in 1898 where she attended high school at St. Helen's Hall. She moved to Brooklyn, New York in 1910 and attended the Pratt Institute using money from her work with the Southern Pacific Railroad.

== Career ==
Upon graduation from Pratt in 1913, Gorham moved back to Portland and became a teacher in the Portland Public Schools, where she taught at Riverdale Elementary and later Washington High School. During the 1930s, she produced numerous wood marquetry works commissioned by the Works Progress Administration (WPA).

Gorham went on to do stained glass work in several different companies and studios. She began at Povey Brothers, a company later owned by the Fuller Glass Company and then her co-workers Albert Gerlach and Bryce Anderson. She went on to Bert Willemse's studio in the 1950s and 60s, and then Pearson Glass and Lloyd's of Oregon.

== Personal life ==
Gorham married Rollen Gorham in 1916. They had two children, Betty and Spencer, and divorced in 1921. Aimee Gorham died in Mercer Island, Washington on November 29, 1973.

== Awards ==
Honorary member of the American Institute of Architects.

== Selected works ==
1937 - Solomon, Portland Art Museum

1937 - Oregon Pioneers, Oregon State College, and Tree of Life, Oregon State University

1937 - Coyotes and Mountain Lions, Timberline Lodge

1938 - Send Us Forth to be Builders of a Better World, Chapman Elementary School

1939 - Brotherhood of Man, Federal Building, New York World's Fair
