= Povey Brothers Studio =

Stained glass company in Portland, Oregon

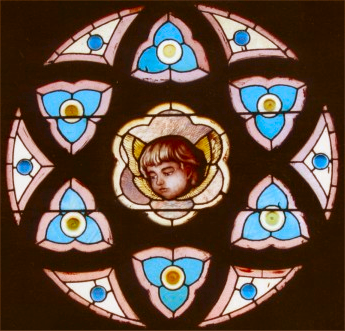
Povey Brothers rose window in Old St. Peter's Landmark, The Dalles, Oregon

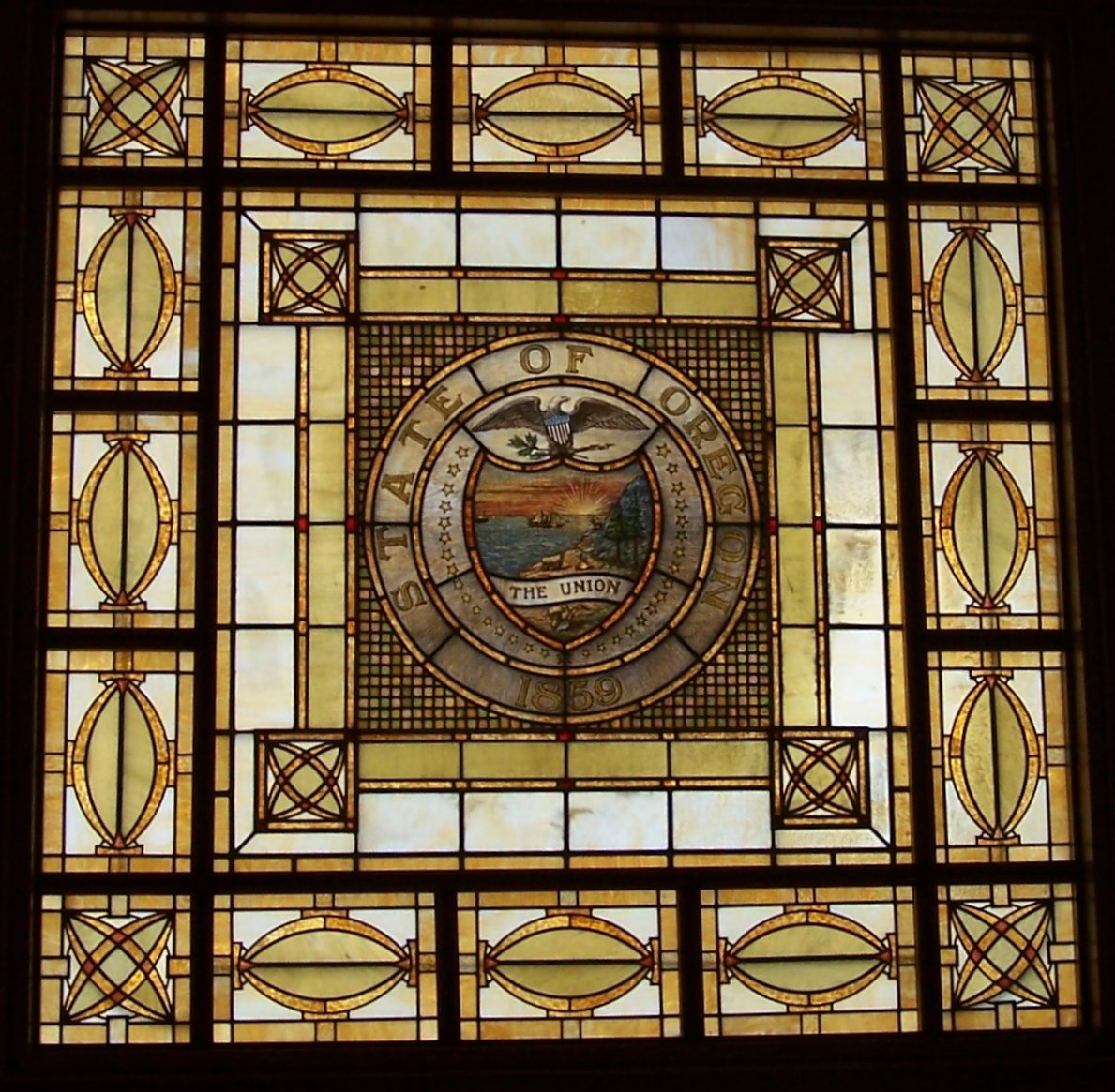
Detail of Oregon State Seal skylight in the courtroom of the Oregon Supreme Court Building, Salem, Oregon

Povey Brothers Studio, also known as Povey Brothers Art Glass Works or Povey Bros. Glass Co., was an American producer of stained glass windows based in Portland, Oregon. The studio was active from 1888 to 1928. As the largest and best known art glass company in Oregon, it produced windows for homes, churches, and commercial buildings throughout the West. When the firm was founded in 1888, it was the only creative window firm in Portland, then a city of 42,000 residents.

Povey Brothers was known as the "Tiffany of the Northwest" and many of the company's windows still exist in historic buildings throughout the region, including those on the National Register of Historic Places (NRHP).

The windows were considered to have extraordinary quality and beauty, and the firm's work was virtually unequaled in the Pacific Northwest. The heyday of Povey Brothers coincided with the growing economic affluence of the region, and the brothers' work was much sought after by the new rich to decorate the large houses they were building. Of this sort of installation, art glass expert Michael McCary said, "People who put in that kind of glass were kind of showing off." The Great Depression and changes in house styles eventually caused demand for the brothers' work to decline, however. Today Povey Brothers windows are a mark of pride in many landmark buildings in Portland.

== History ==
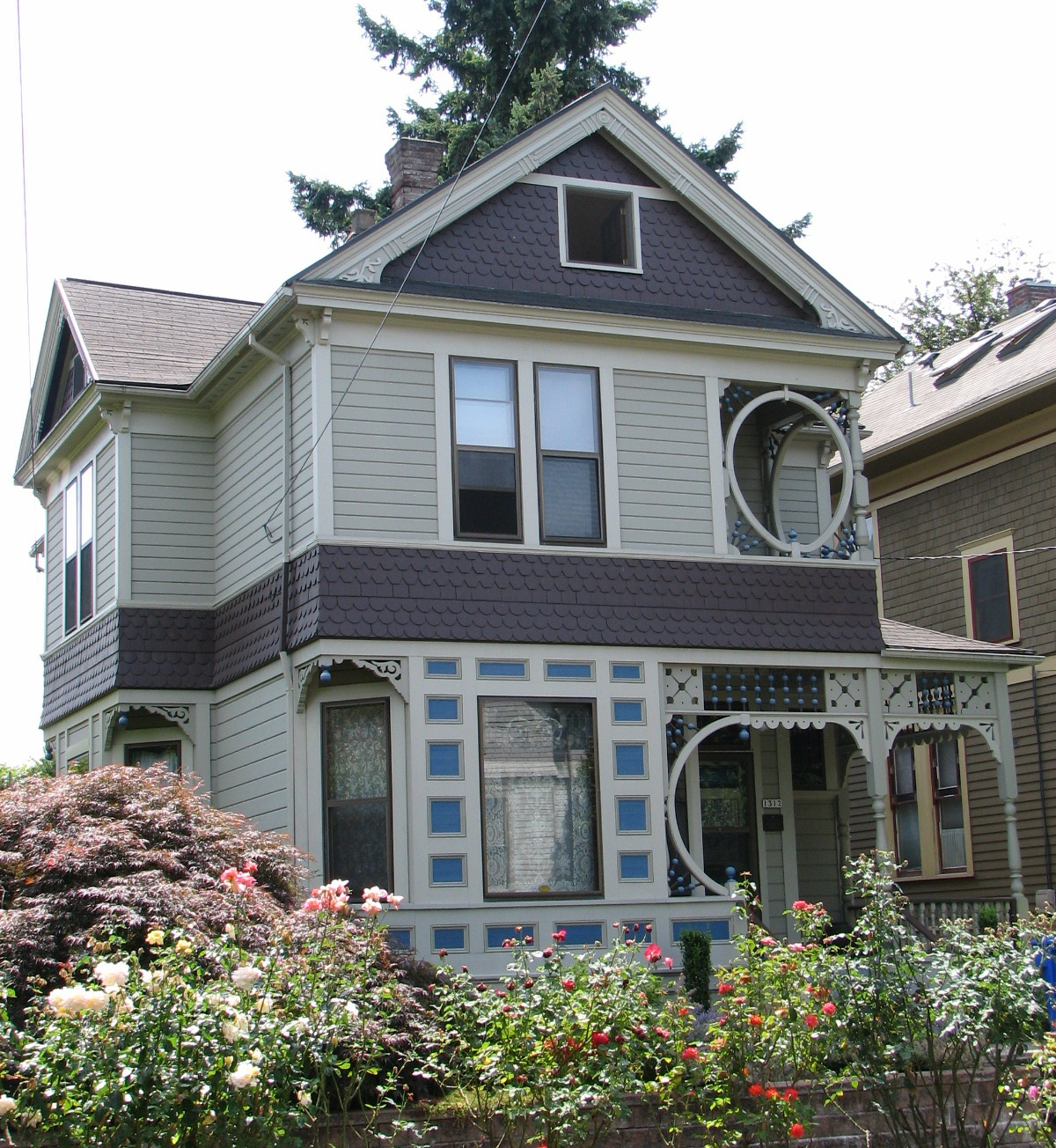
John E. G. Povey House, Portland, Oregon, home of one of the Povey Brothers

The company was founded by David Lincoln Povey, the son of English-born stained glass window maker Joseph Povey, who immigrated to the United States in 1848 and subsequently worked in stained glass in Philadelphia, New York City, and Newark, New Jersey. The family, who had been in the stained glass trade for generations, eventually settled in St. Louis, Missouri. David Povey was born in 1865. He studied art at Cooper Union in New York and traveled in Europe for further study before moving to Portland. David formed the glass company in 1888 with his brother John, shortly after working on a commission for First Presbyterian Church. The company incorporated in 1893. John was the main craftsman and did the glazing and leading, while David did the design and art work. Their brother George Povey later joined the company as its accountant and business manager, and two Povey sisters also worked for the company. All three of the brothers worked in various glass studios on the East Coast before establishing their Portland shop. At the height of their business, the brothers employed 25 workers, including several Povey family members. David died in 1924 and his sons David and Darrel took over the business. In 1925, they hired Albert Gerlach, formerly of Giannini & Hilgart in Chicago and trained at the Art Institute of Chicago, to assist in the business. The Povey Brothers sold the company to W. P. Fuller in 1930, and Gerlach remained at the company until 1950.

John Povey died in 1917. His Queen Anne Victorian home in the Irvington neighborhood, the John E. G. Povey House, is listed on the National Register of Historic Places.

David Povey's daughter, Portland architect Polly Povey Thompson, had planned to write a book on her father's works, but she died in 1994 before it could be completed. Povey windows continue to be documented. George Povey's granddaughter, Laurie Povey Crawford, of Everett, Washington, did not know that the First Presbyterian Church in Everett held Povey windows until 2015.

== Production and style ==
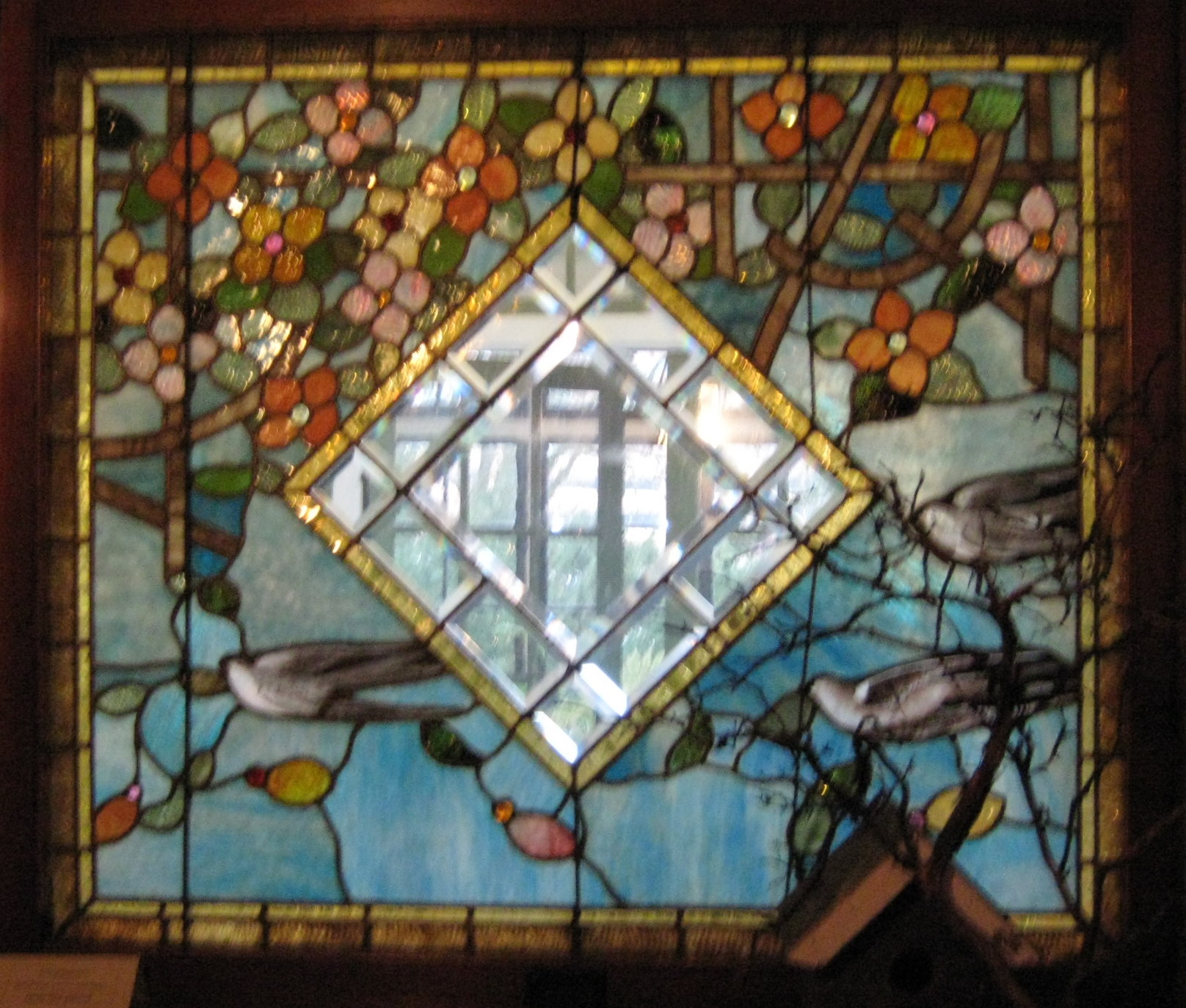
Povey Brothers window at Deepwood Estate, Salem, Oregon, showing their signature dogwood motif

The brothers imported their glass from Europe, but designed and constructed their windows in Portland. They often used opalescent glass in their work, a style that John La Farge and Louis Tiffany had pioneered in the 1870s. Their church windows were done in a Classical style often based on famous religious paintings, such as those by Raphael, and had images or scenes painted on nonopalescent glass. They were also noted for their use of "jewels", small, thickly cut faceted pieces of glass in rich colors, and for several other types and textures of glass, including Kokomo, crackle, rippled, granite-textured, and machine-rolled. The studio's early residential work was colorful and ornate, often using Art Nouveau motifs, and later work was influenced by the Arts and Crafts Movement. Popular motifs included grape clusters, roses, lilies, birds, and dogwood, which became a signature of the company. Another notable feature of the studio's work was the use of clear glass in the background to allow light to pass through the windows on the Northwest's typically overcast days.

Besides windows, the company also designed other glass products, including light fixtures that had a horizontal Prairie School design influence.

The studio was known for using the latest equipment and trade techniques, and for working with architects and homeowners to create unique designs that set the Poveys apart. David Povey, who developed a distinct style, designed virtually every window that left the studio. While the company's residential work was often small in scale, its church installations could be quite massive, with multiple panels.

Most Povey windows are not signed, which led to imitators passing off their work as the Poveys'. It also makes the Poveys' work difficult to identify. In 1923, David Povey began signing the widows with "Povey Brothers Studio" and the year of completion. This may have first been done for the windows of the First Christian Church in Portland, and the last such signatures may have been on the windows of Atkinson Memorial Church in 1924, the year David died.

== Studios ==
By 1889, the Povey Brothers Studio was located in the Phoenix Building at 124 SW Ash Street in Portland. The building is a contributing property in the Skidmore/Old Town Historic District.

In 1905, the company relocated to the Povey Building at 408 NW 5th Avenue in Portland, designed for them by architect Emil Schacht. The company was still located there in 1926. The Povey Building is a contributing property to the Portland New Chinatown/Japantown Historic District.

== Buildings containing Povey Brothers glass ==
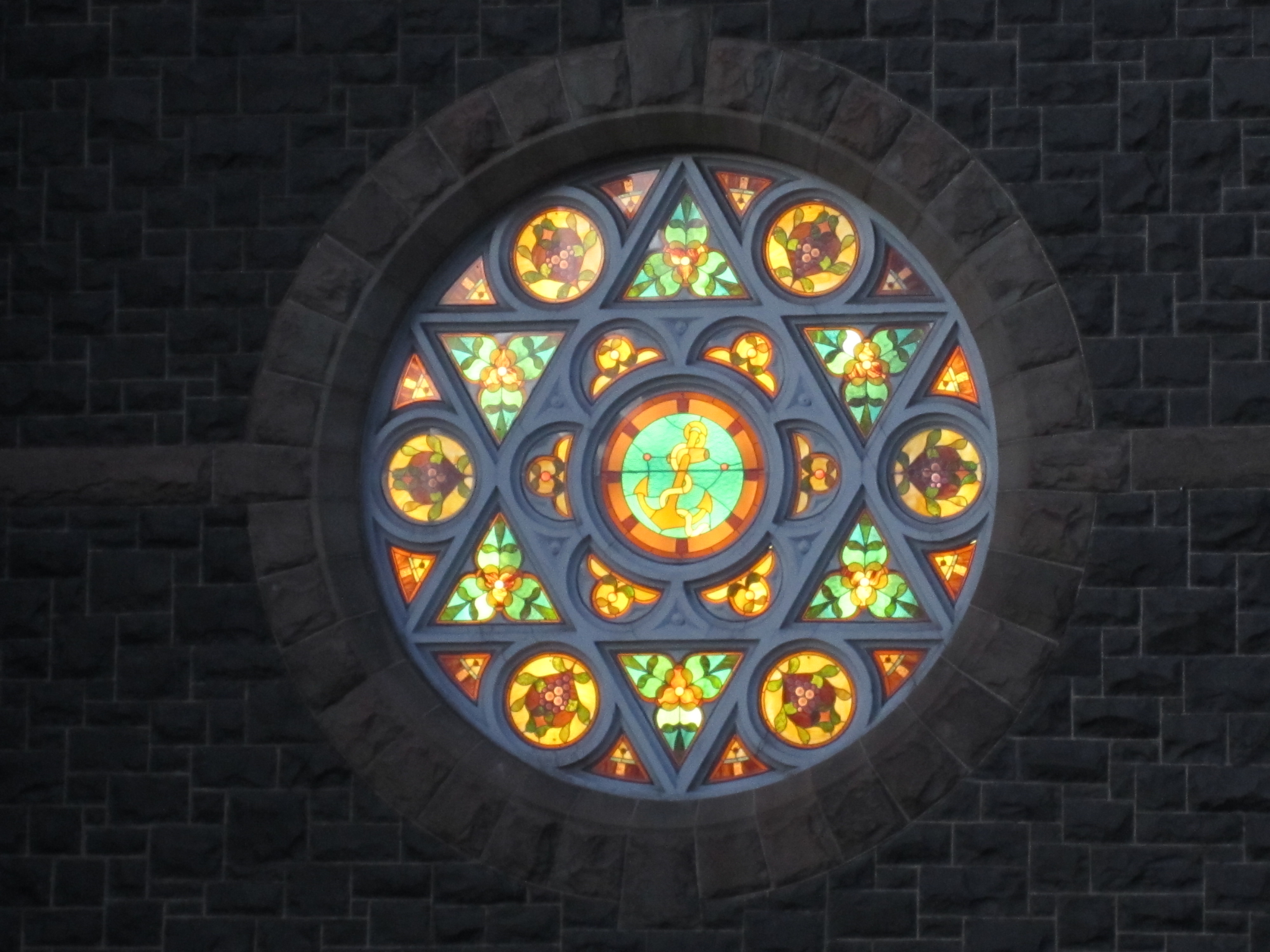
Rose window depicting an anchor from First Presbyterian Church in Portland, backlit at night (see also in the day)

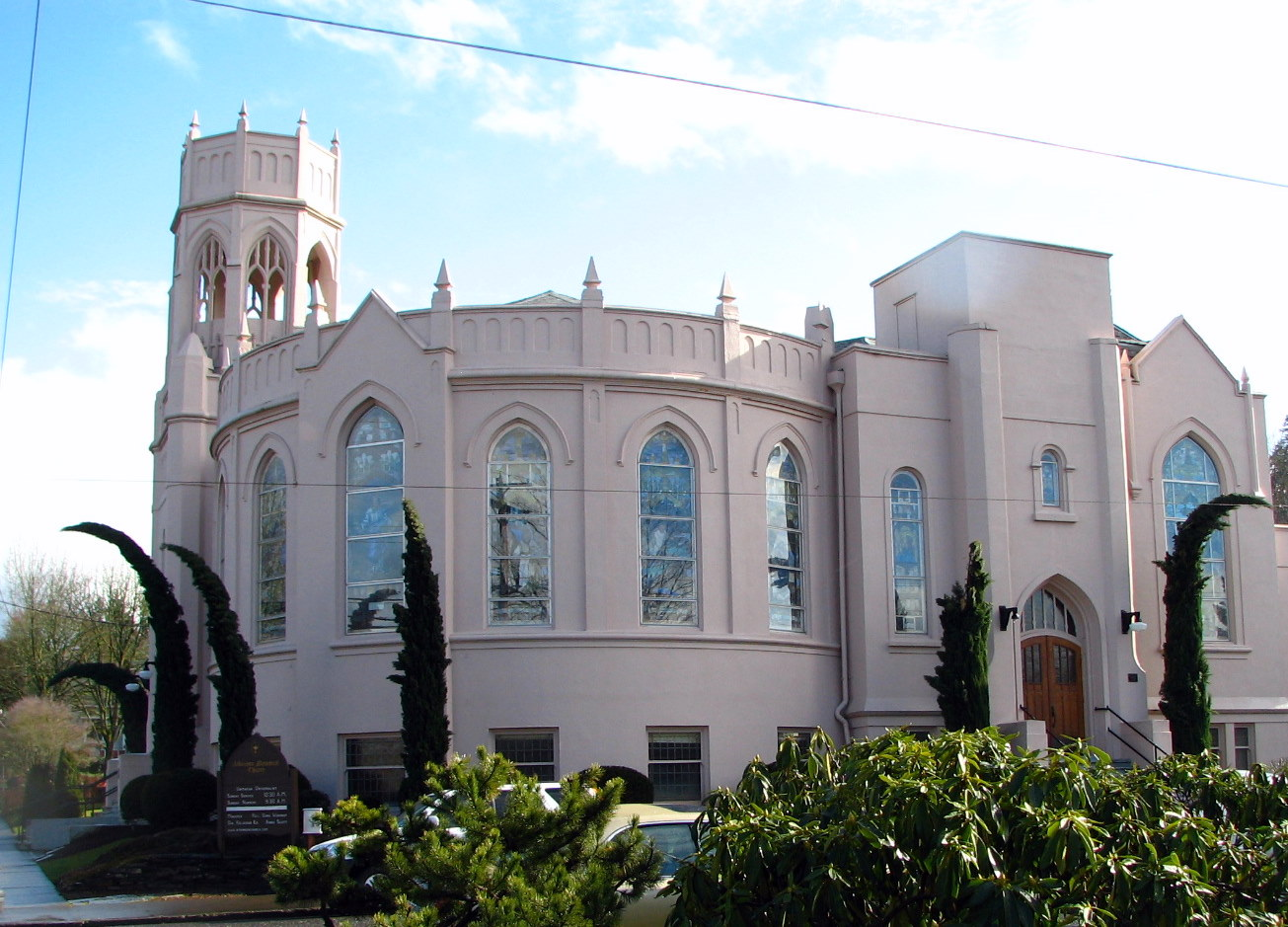
Atkinson Memorial Unitarian Church in Oregon City (formerly the First Congregational Church of Oregon City)

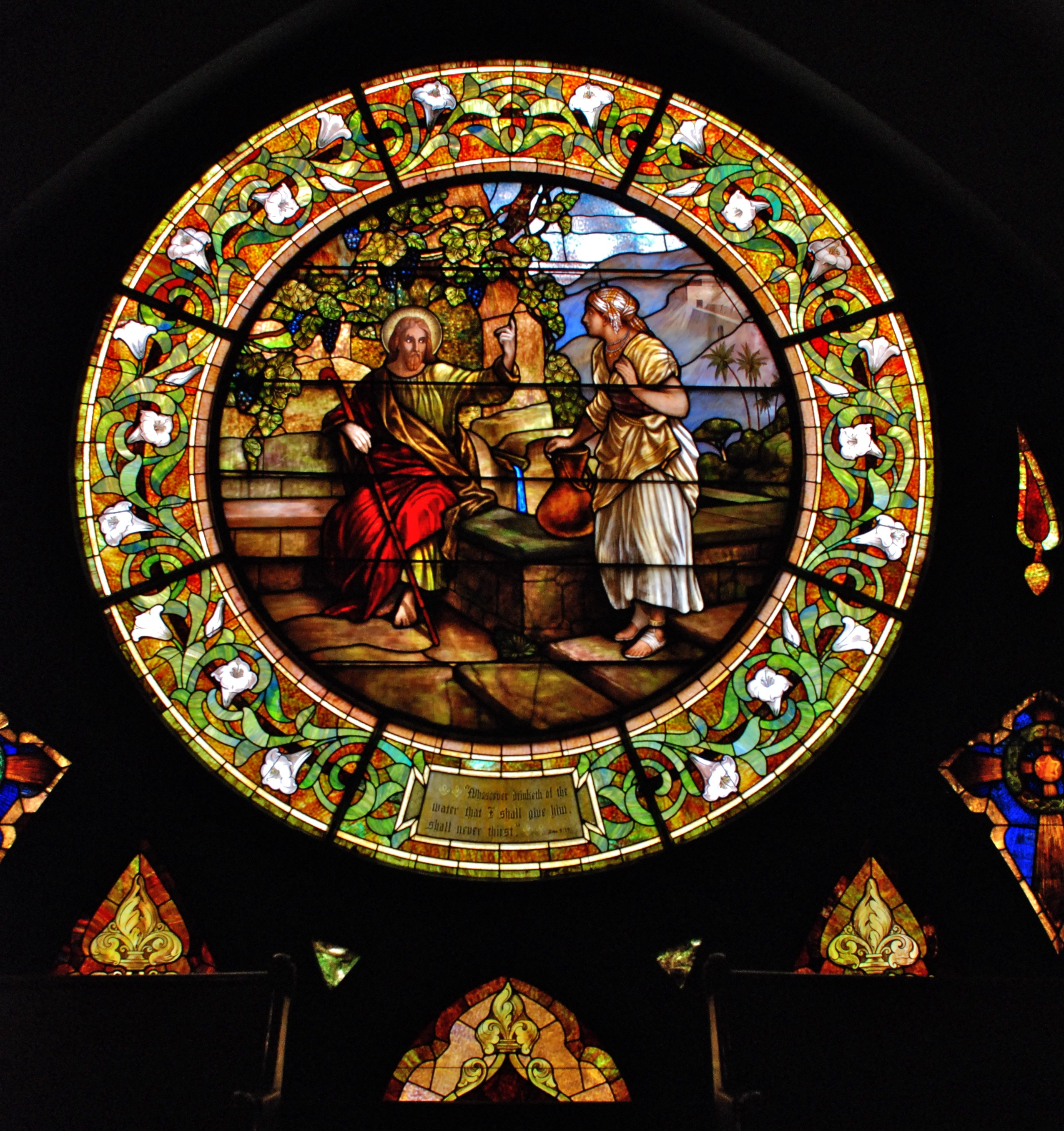
One of several biblical-themed Povey windows in Portland's First Congregational Church

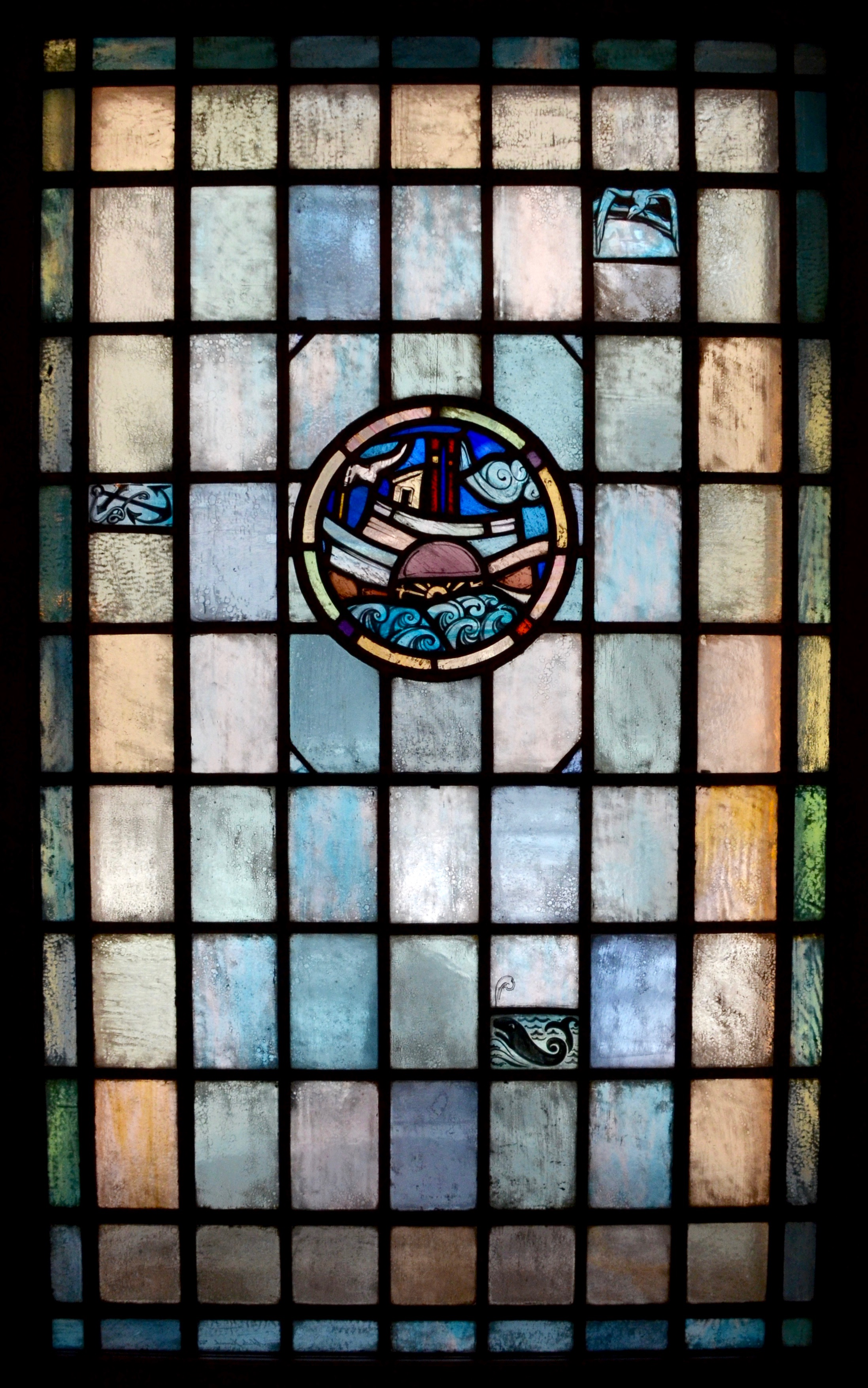
In the board room of the United States National Bank Building

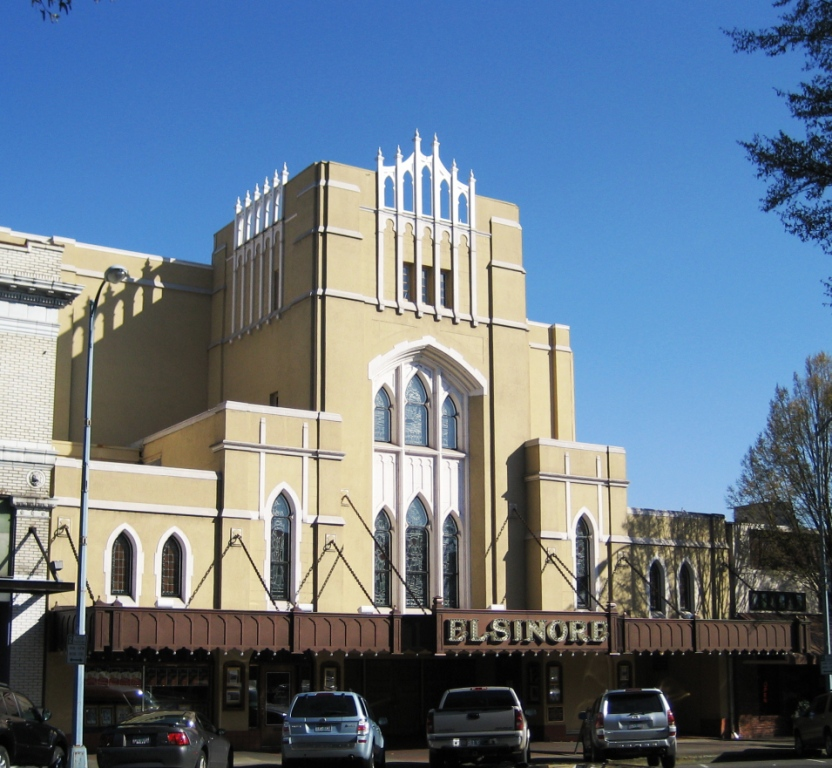
Elsinore Theatre, Salem, Oregon

=== Listed on the NRHP in Oregon ===
- Ashland Memorial Mausoleum, Mountain View Cemetery, Ashland
- Atkinson Memorial Church (formerly the First Congregational Church), Oregon City (1924)
- Boschke–Boyd House, Portland (attributed)
- Burke–Clark House, Portland
- Charles J. and Elsa Schnabel House (1907), Portland, NRHP-listed.
- David Cole House ("Queen Ann Victorian Mansion"), Portland
- Deepwood Estate, Salem
- Ebbert Memorial United Methodist Church, Springfield (1916), a contributing property of the Washburne Historic District
- Elsinore Theatre, Salem, series of windows based on Hamlet
- First Congregational United Church of Christ, Portland (1906)
- First Immanuel Evangelical Lutheran Church, Portland, a contributing property of the Alphabet Historic District
- First Presbyterian Church, Astoria, a contributing property of the Shively-McClure Historic District
- First Presbyterian Church, Portland
- First United Methodist Church, Ashland, a contributing property of the Skidmore Academy Historic District
- Harmon–Neils House, Portland
- Frank C. Barnes House, Portland (attributed)
- Huber's Restaurant, Portland
- John E. G. Povey House, Portland
- Josef Jacobberger House, Portland (attributed)
- Josef Jacobberger Country House, Portland
- Joseph Kendall House, Portland
- John Palmer House, Portland
- Lewis and Elizabeth Van Vleet House, Portland
- Louis Pfunder House, Portland, designed by Emil Schacht, who often worked closely with the Poveys; the house, built for an affluent nursery owner, is filled with floral-motif windows
- Lytle–Hawley House, Portland
- The Old Church, Portland, notable for its large "Consider the Lilies" window
- Mausoleum, Medford IOOF Cemetery
- Methodist Episcopal South Church, Roseburg, all but one of the windows were damaged in the Roseburg Blast of 1959
- Monastery of the Precious Blood, Portland (1922)
- Nathan Loeb House, Portland (1893)
- Old St. Peter's Landmark, The Dalles, the faces of the windows' cherubs are modeled after the daughters of one of the Povey Brothers
- Oregon Supreme Court Building, Salem, courtroom skylight
- Pittock Mansion, Portland
- John Ralston House, Albany (1889) (attributed)
- St. James Lutheran Church, Portland
- St. Mary's Cathedral of the Immaculate Conception, Portland (1925), a contributing property of the Alphabet Historic District
- St. Mary Parish, Mt. Angel
- St. Patrick's Catholic Church, Portland
- Temple Beth Israel, Portland
- Thaddeus Fisher House, Portland
- United Presbyterian Church (Whitespires), Albany
- United States National Bank Building, Portland, in board room
- Wells–Furnish House, Portland

=== Other Oregon installations ===
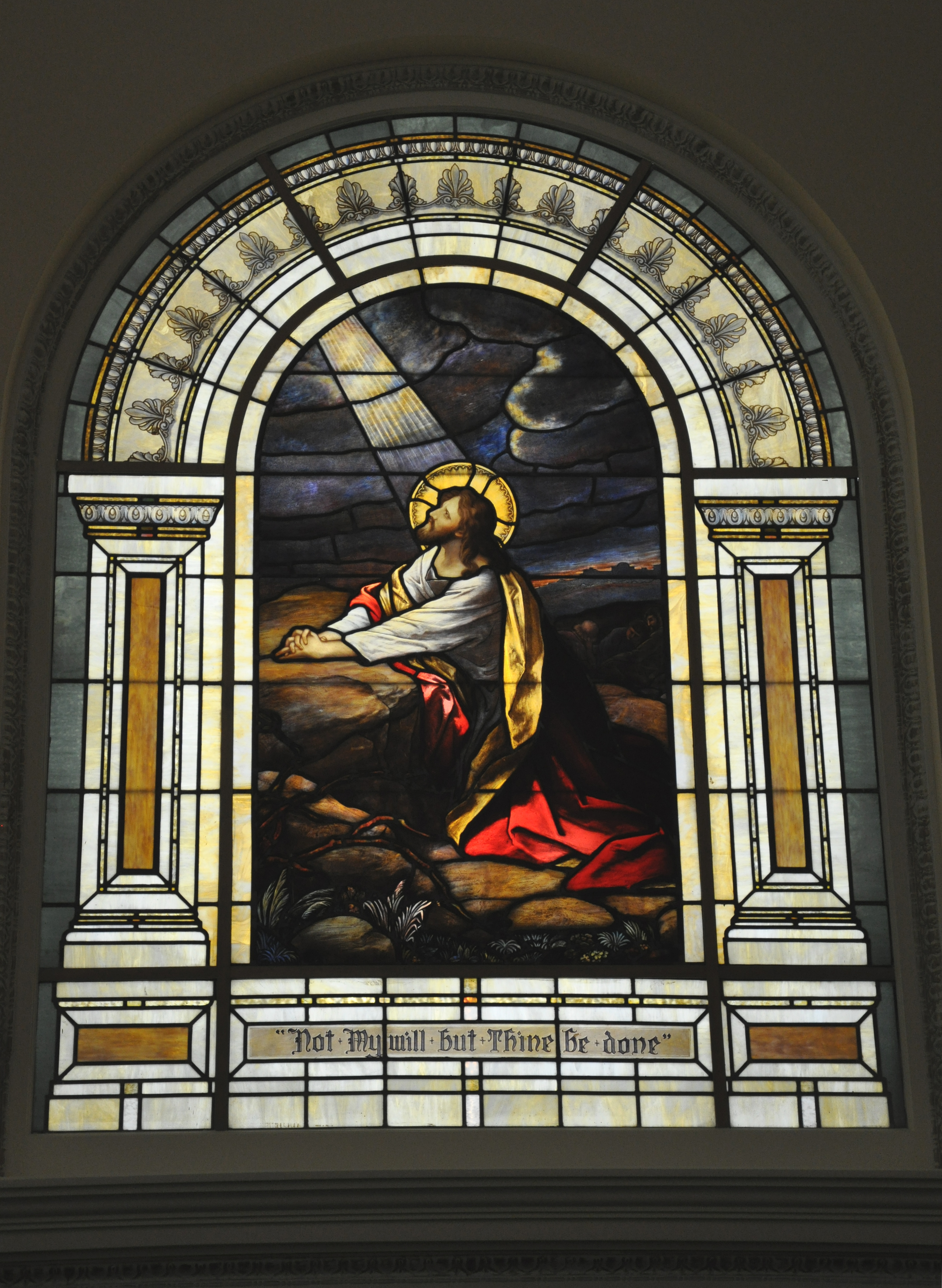
The "Not my will but thine be done" window in Portland First Christian Church is a reproduction of the Heinrich Hofmann painting Christ in Gethsemane

First Christian Church in Eugene has Povey Brothers windows created for the current building constructed in 1911, as well as windows moved from a previous building that were made in about 1865 by other artists.

Lawrence Hall at the University of Oregon has some of the stained glass panels originally installed as a skylight in 1915 in the NRHP-listed Johnson Hall, the school's administration building. The panels were dispersed during a 1949 remodel of the hall; some were used in the school's Erb Memorial Union. A 1998 restoration moved the panels to a boardroom of Johnson Hall and a hallway of Lawrence Hall.

- Canby Wedding Chapel (formerly Canby Church of God)
- Church of St. Michael the Archangel, Portland (1902)
- First Baptist Church, Portland (1894)
- First Christian Church, Portland (1923)
- First Presbyterian Church, Corvallis
- First United Methodist Church, Corvallis
- First United Methodist Church, Bend
- First United Methodist Church, Eugene (originally in the 1912 Eugene Methodist Episcopal Church)
- Methodist Episcopal Church, Wilsonville, now owned by the McMenamins brewpub chain
- Portland Mennonite Church, Portland
- Rose City Park United Methodist Church, Portland
- Wilhelm's Portland Memorial Funeral Home, skylight in the Rose Room

=== Works outside Oregon ===
- Craigdarroch Castle, Victoria, British Columbia, Canada
- Dayton First Christian Church, Dayton, Washington (NRHP), a contributing property of the South Side Historic District
- St. Peter's by-the-Sea Episcopal Church, Sitka, Alaska (NRHP)
- First Christian Church, Wilmington, Ohio (attributed)
- First Methodist Episcopal Church, Seattle, Washington (NRHP) (now Daniels Recital Hall)
- First Presbyterian Church, Everett, Washington (1910)
- Pioneer United Methodist Church, Walla Walla, Washington
- St. Anthony Chapel, Holy Spirit Parish, Kent, Washington (1924)
- The Seasons Performance Hall, Yakima, Washington (formally Christian Science Church)

The Povey Brothers also completed commissions in the city of Bellingham, Washington, and in Idaho, Montana, Utah, and Northern California.

=== Former installations ===
- First Christian Church, Seattle, demolished in 2005, after being damaged in the 2001 Nisqually earthquake; the windows were salvaged
- St. Mary's Parish, Albany, destroyed by fire in 1989 after Portland art glass craftsman Michael McCary had spent two years restoring 18 windows, completing his work in 1988
- Second Trinity Church, SW 6th and Oak, Portland, destroyed by fire in 1902

Many Portland buildings that once had Povey glass windows have been demolished, but the Bosco-Milligan Foundation/Architectural Heritage Center holds several salvaged Povey windows in its building artifact collection.

== See also ==
- Louise Bryant, radical journalist, designed a window for Povey Brothers
