= Clarissa McKeyes Inman House =

Historic building in Portland, Oregon, U.S.

- U.S. National Register of Historic Places
- Portland Historic Landmark
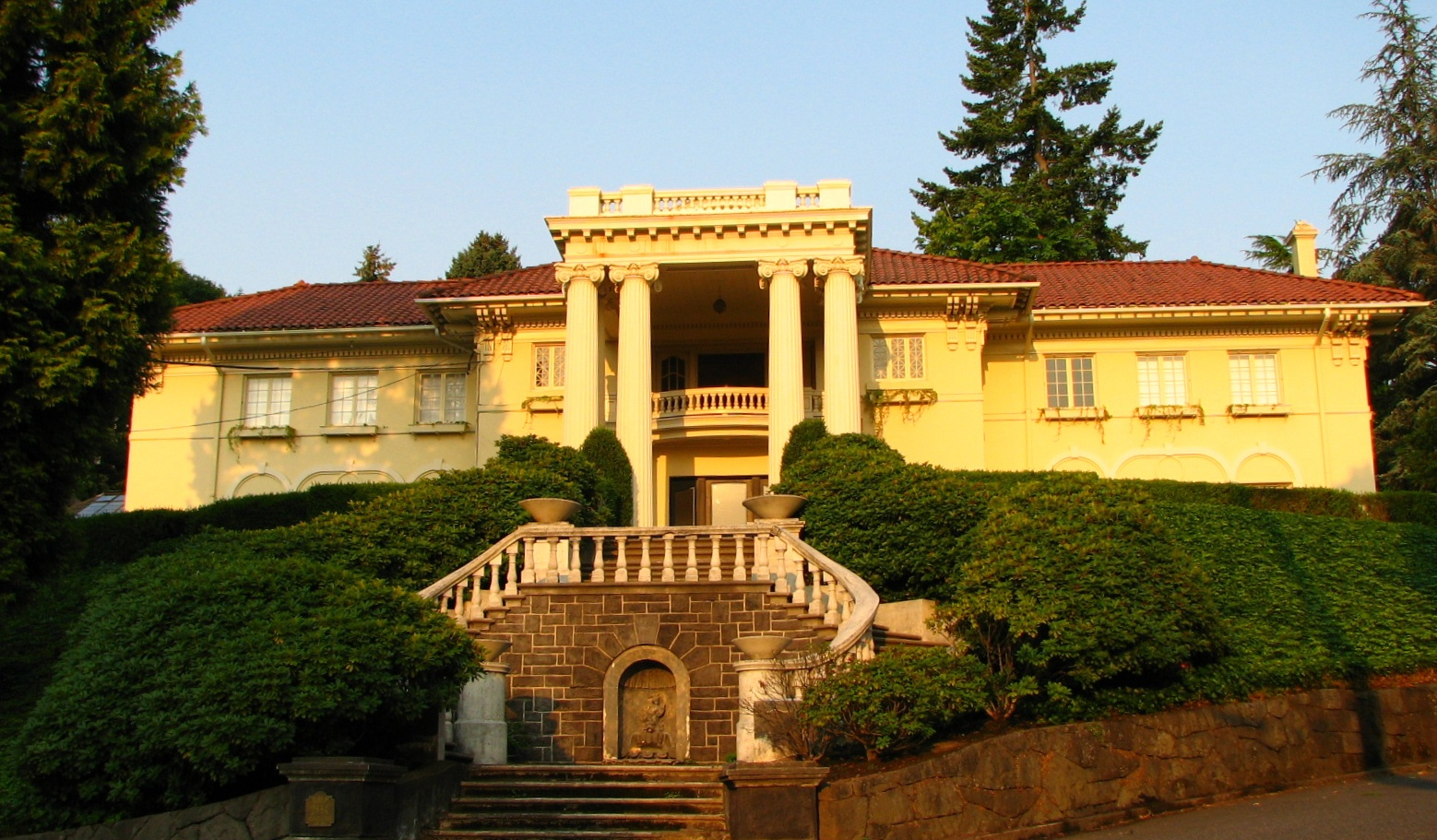

- Location within Portland, Oregon
- Location: 2884 NW Cumberland Road; Portland, Oregon
- Coordinates: 45°31′43″N 122°42′38″W
- Area: 0.6 acres (0.24 ha)
- Built: 1926
- Architect: David L. Williams
- Architectural style: Prairie School, Beaux Arts, Mediterranean
- NRHP reference No.: 90000275
- Added to NRHP: February 23, 1990

The Clarissa McKeyes Inman House, also known as Ariel Terraces, is a house in Portland, Oregon, designed by David L. Williams and listed on the National Register of Historic Places.

== See also ==
- National Register of Historic Places listings in Northwest Portland, Oregon
