= Congress Hotel (Portland, Oregon) =

Former hotel in Portland, Oregon, U.S.

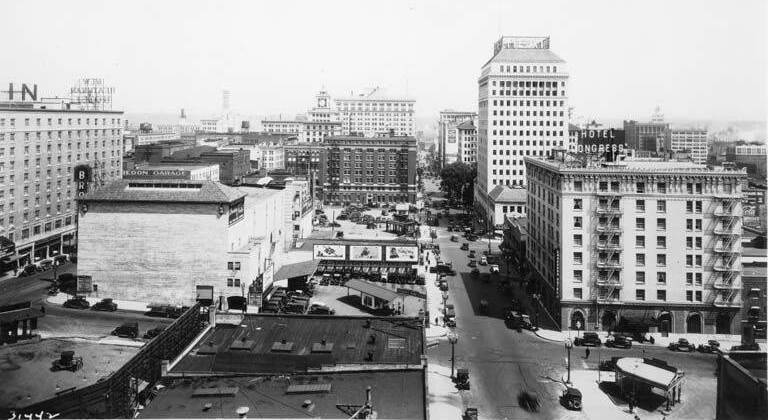
- A circa 1930 photograph of downtown Portland with the Congress Hotel in the righthand foreground
- Interactive map of the Congress Hotel area

General information
- Location: Portland, Oregon, United States
- Coordinates: 45°31′0″N 122°40′46.5″W
- Completed: 1912
- Demolished: 1977

Design and construction
- Architect: David L. Williams

The Congress Hotel was a hotel in Portland, Oregon. It was designed by architect David L. Williams and completed in 1912. The building was later demolished and replaced by the Congress Center.

== Description and history ==
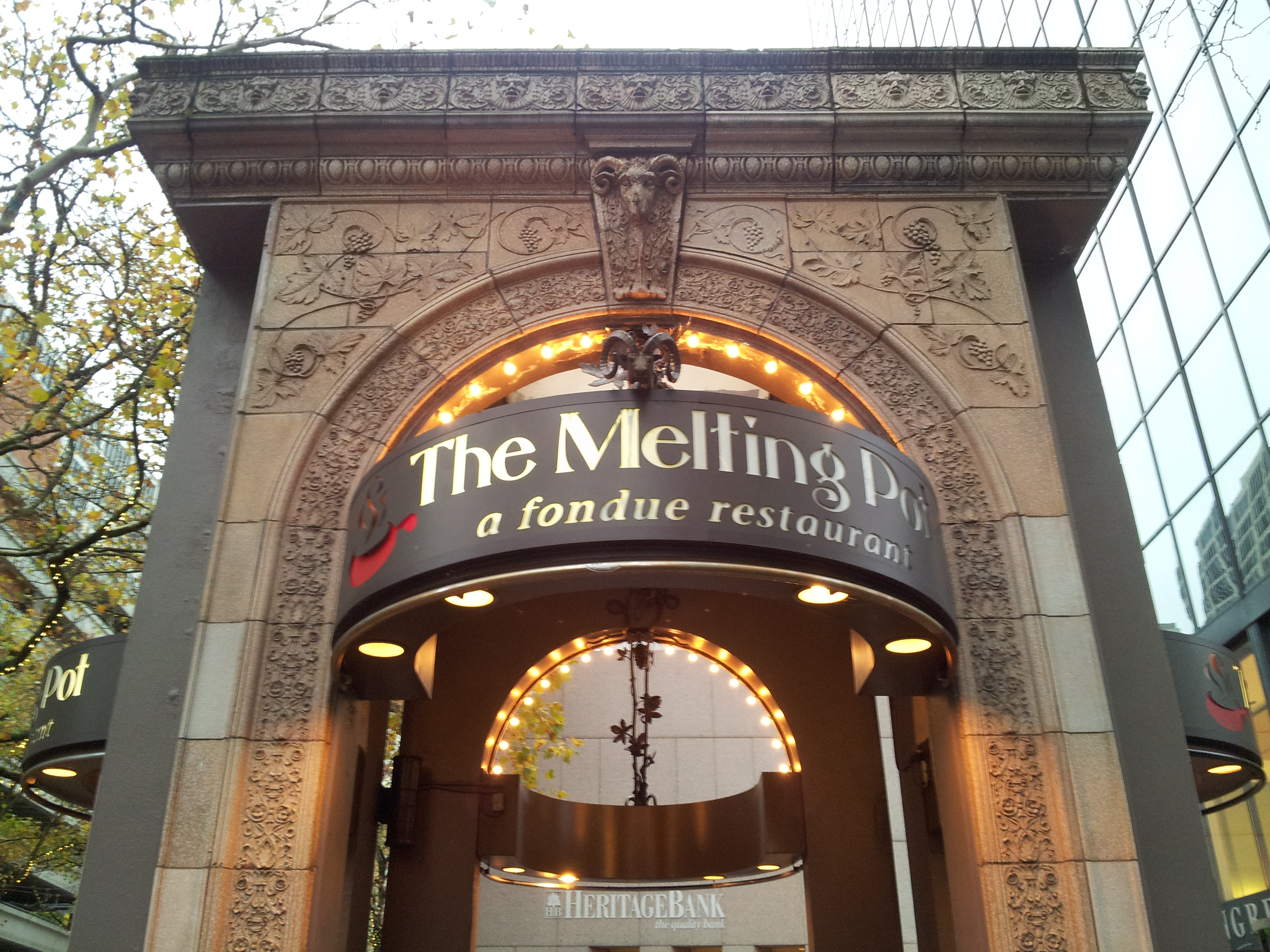
Arches from the Congress Hotel were converted into a gazebo structure (pictured in 2013) that remains on the city's Historic Resource Inventory.

Designed by architect David L. Williams, the 119-room hotel opened at the intersection of Southwest Sixth Avenue and Main Street in downtown Portland in 1912. Hubert Humphrey and Robert Kennedy are among notable guests. The hotel remained family owned until 1977. Governor Robert W. Straub attended a "wake" for the building, before it was demolished in 1977 or 1978, and later replaced by the Orbanco Building (now known as the Congress Center).

The Congress Hotel hosted the National Chrysanthemum Society's convention in 1958. In 2005, writers for Willamette Week described how the hotel was used by local government officials during the 1970s. Caryn B. Brooks and Steve Forrester wrote, "In those days, public council sessions were strictly pro forma: The real business of the council was done in private, over lunch at the Congress Hotel."

Johann H. Tuerck completed some of the hotel's wrought iron work. Terracotta arches from the building were used to create an ornate gazebo structure that was later used as an entrance to the restaurant The Melting Pot. The structure has been placed on the city's Historic Resource Inventory.
