= John E. G. Povey House =

Historic building in Portland, Oregon, U.S.

- U.S. National Register of Historic Places
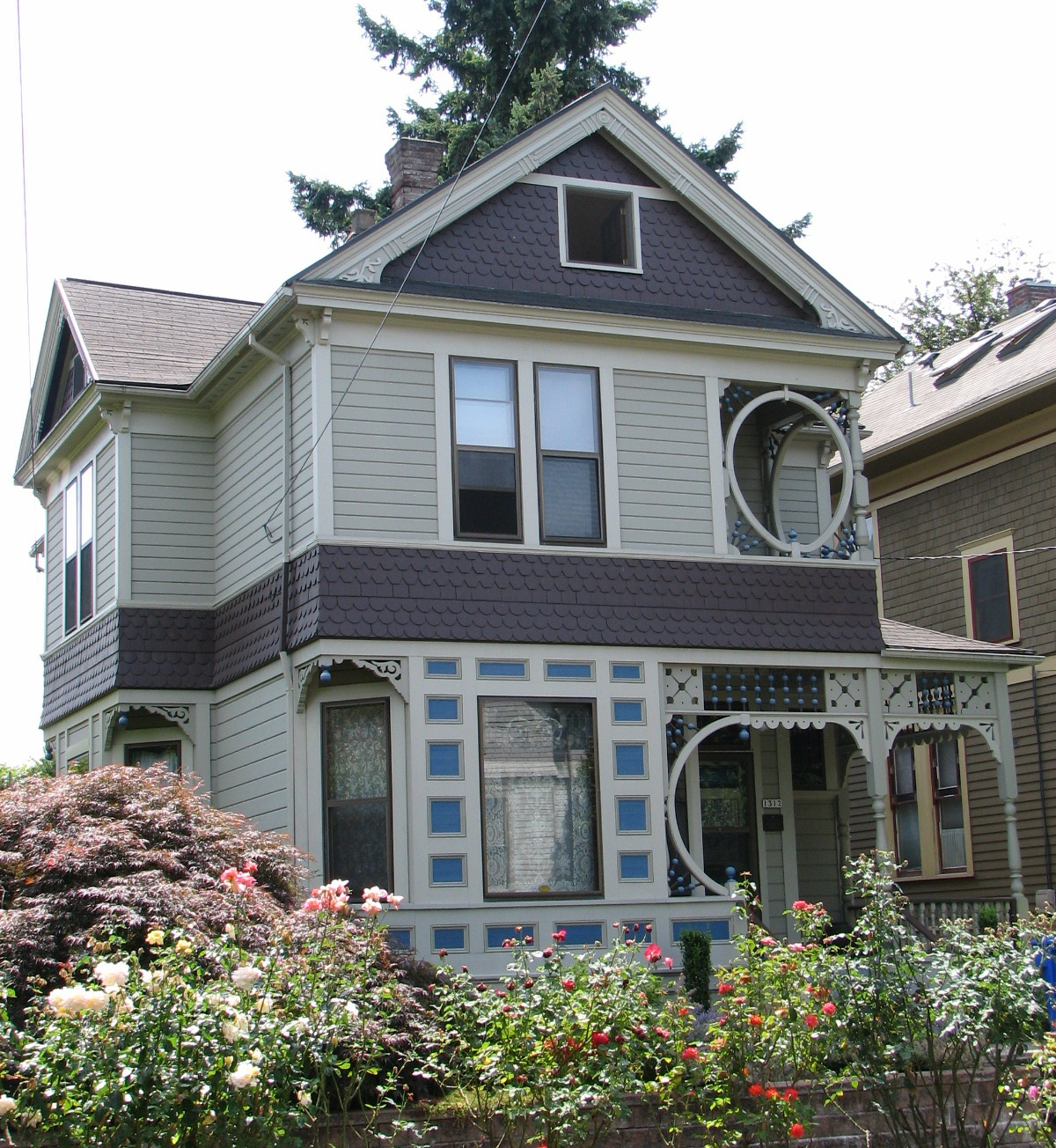

- Location within Portland, Oregon
- Location: 1312 NE Tillamook St., Portland, Oregon
- Coordinates: 45°32′15″N 122°39′3″W
- Area: 0.1 acres (0.040 ha)
- Built: 1891
- Built by: Peter Hobkirk of contractors Hobkirk & McKenzie
- Architectural style: Queen Anne
- NRHP reference No.: 98001121
- Added to NRHP: August 28, 1998

The John E. G. Povey House in northeast Portland, Oregon, is a Queen Anne-style house that was built in 1891. The house is asymmetrical and is about 28 feet (8.5 m) wide by 46 feet (14 m) deep. It was home of glass-maker John E. G. Povey (1867–1917).

It was listed on the National Register of Historic Places in 1998. It was deemed significant for its association with John E. G. Povey and the Povey Brothers Art & Stained Glass Works company, and also for its architecture "containing high artistic merit both in the craftsmanship of the structure and the stained glass designs in many of the windows."

The Povey Brothers Art Glass Works firm was founded by John E. and brother David L. Povey in Portland in 1888; it was the leading art-glass maker in the area from about 1890 to about 1920.

John E. G. Povey died in the house in 1917, at age 49.

== See also ==
- National Register of Historic Places listings in Northeast Portland, Oregon
