= Nathan Loeb House =

Historic building in Portland, Oregon, U.S.

- U.S. National Register of Historic Places
- U.S. Historic district – Contributing property
- Portland Historic Landmark
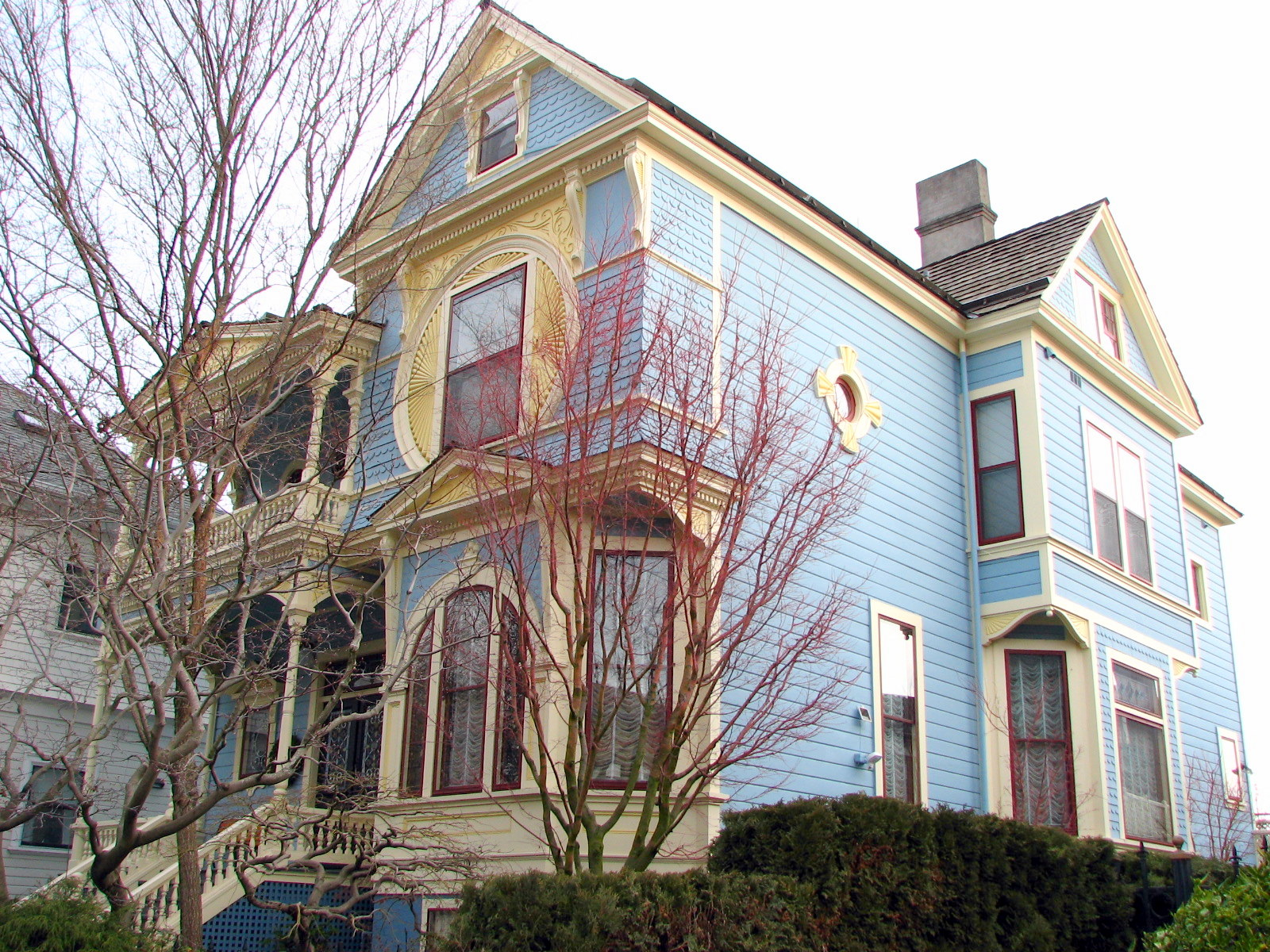

- Location within Portland, Oregon Location within the United States
- Location: 726 NW 22nd Avenue; Portland, Oregon
- Coordinates: 45°31′41″N 122°41′47″W
- Built: 1893
- Architectural style: Queen Anne
- Part of: Alphabet Historic District (ID00001293)
- NRHP reference No.: 78002318
- Added to NRHP: January 20, 1978

The Nathan Loeb House is a house located in northwest Portland, Oregon, that is listed on the National Register of Historic Places. It features stained glass windows by the Povey Brothers.

== See also ==
- National Register of Historic Places listings in Northwest Portland, Oregon
