= First Congregational Church of Oregon City =

Historic church in Oregon, United States

- U.S. National Register of Historic Places
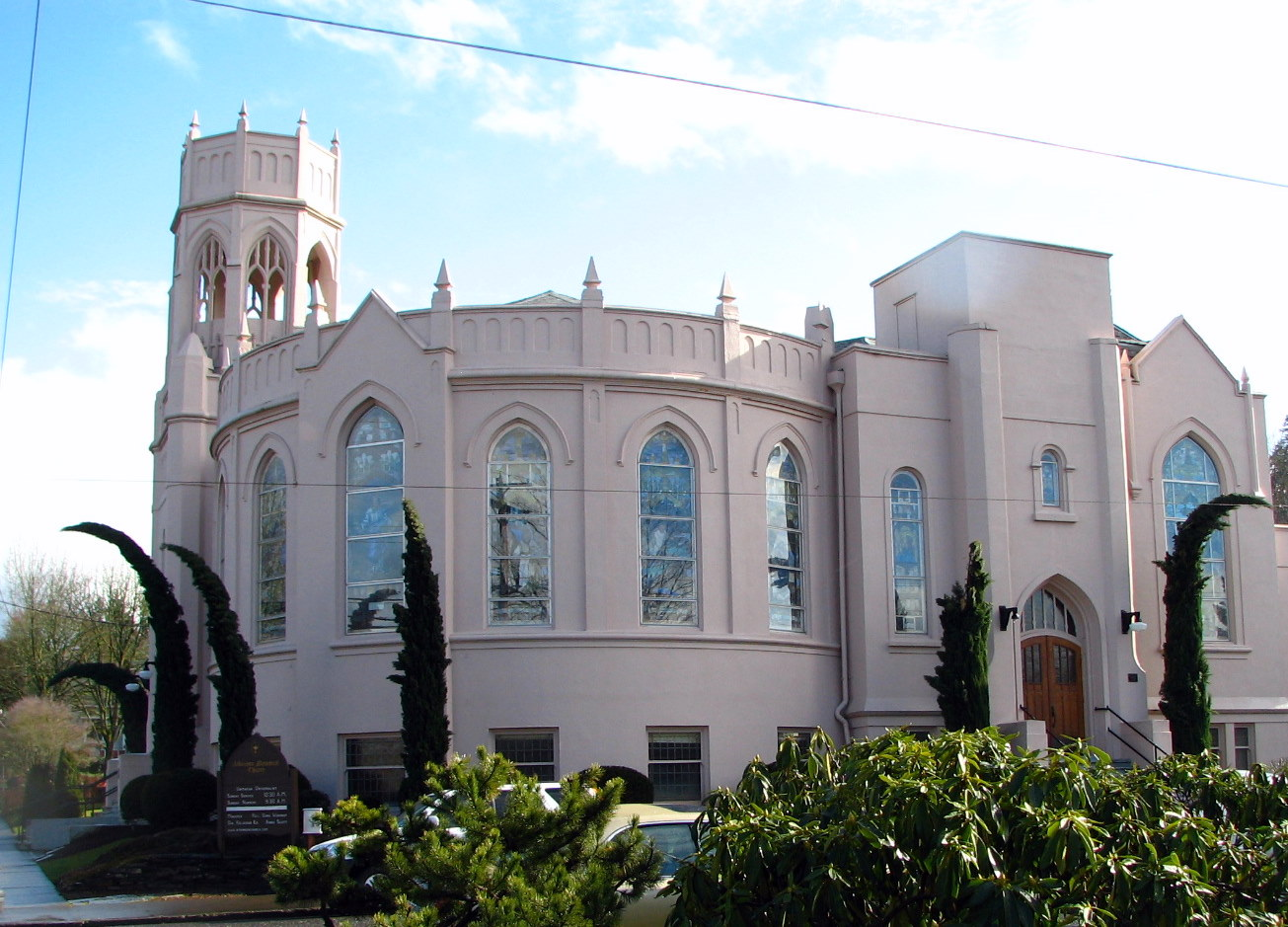

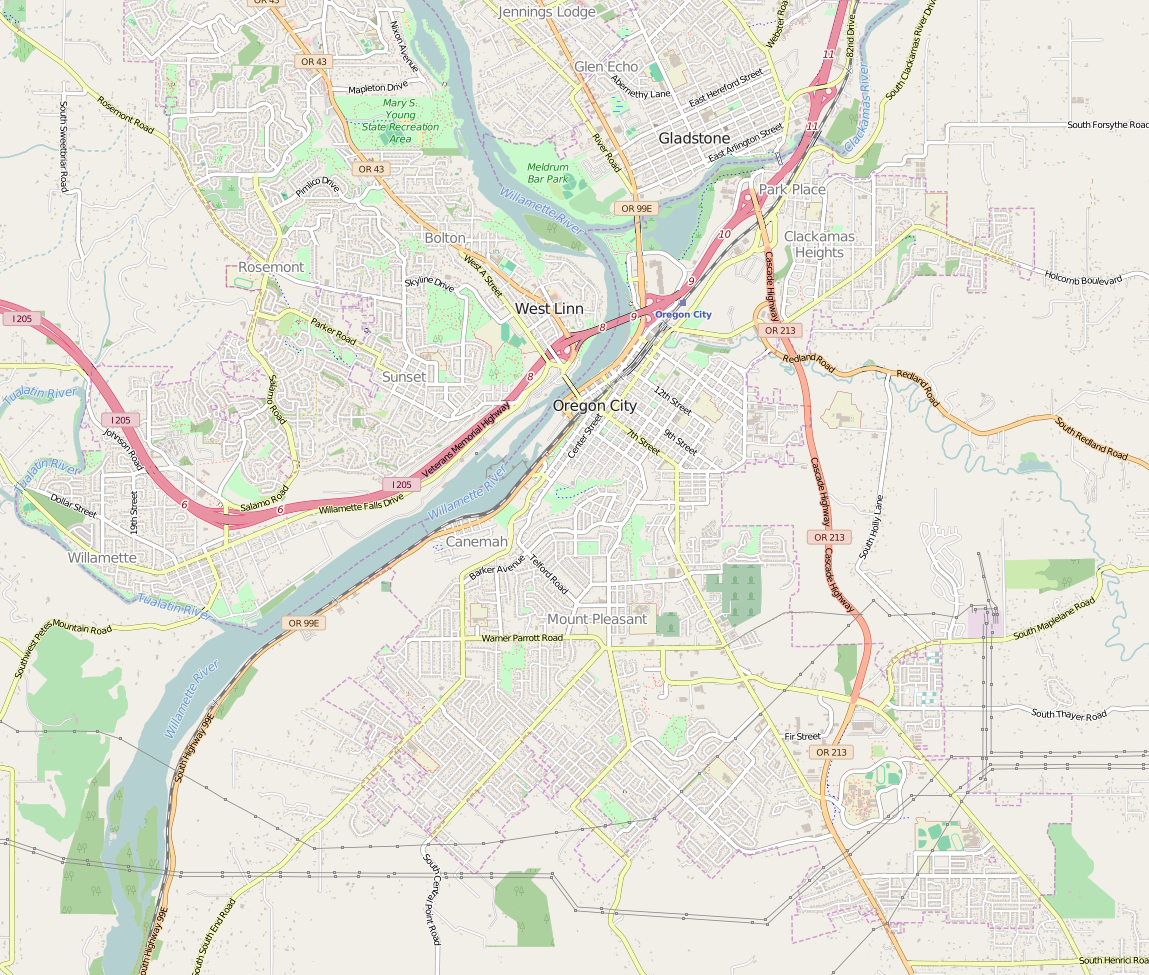
- Location within Oregon City OR Location within Oregon Location within the United States
- Location: 6th and John Adams Sts., Oregon City, Oregon
- Coordinates: 45°21′18″N 122°36′13″W
- Area: less than one acre
- Built: 1925
- Built by: Andrews, W.D., Construction Co.
- Architect: Tobey, Willard F.
- Architectural style: Twentieth Century Gothic
- NRHP reference No.: 82003723
- Added to NRHP: August 26, 1982

The First Congregational Church of Oregon City, also known as Atkinson Memorial Congregational Church, is a historic building located at 6th and John Adams Sts. in Oregon City, Oregon. The congregation was formed in 1844 as a non-denominational Protestant congregation. In 1892 they affiliated with the Congregational Christian Church from the local Congregational Society that had been formed in 1849 from the 1844 congregation. The present building was constructed in the Gothic Revival style in 1925 after the previous building had been destroyed in a fire in 1923. It was listed on the National Register of Historic Places in 1982.

It is historically important as a landmark in Oregon City and, according to its NRHP nomination, "as the fullest expression of an architectural type in which the architect, Willard F. Tobey, specialized and for its outstanding array of pictorial stained glass." The stained glass windows were designed by Portland's Povey Brothers Studio. In 1961 the congregation became affiliated with Unitarian Universalism, and they changed their name to the Unitarian Universalist Congregation at Willamette Falls in 2016.
