= Robert F. Lytle House =

Historic building in Portland, Oregon, U.S.

- U.S. National Register of Historic Places
- Portland Historic Landmark
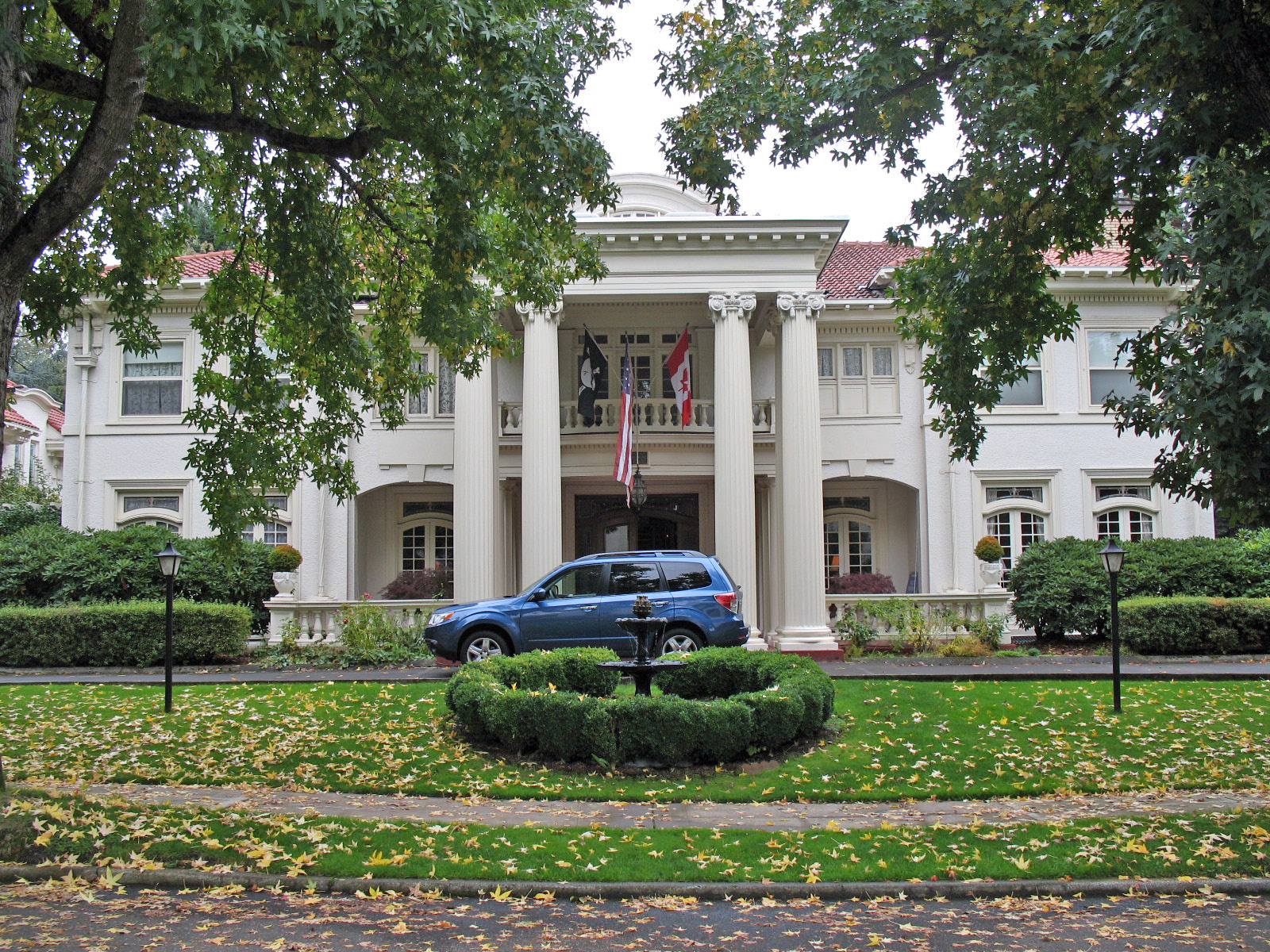

- Location within Portland, Oregon
- Location: 1914 NE 22nd Avenue; Portland, Oregon
- Coordinates: 45°32′12″N 122°38′34″W
- Area: less than one acre
- Built: 1912
- Built by: McHolland Brothers
- Architect: Williams, David Lochead
- Architectural style: Classical Revival, Other, Mediterranean
- NRHP reference No.: 83002173
- Added to NRHP: May 19, 1983

The Robert F. Lytle House is a house located in northeast Portland, Oregon, listed on the National Register of Historic Places. The architect was David L. Williams. The interior includes stained-glass windows by Povey Brothers Glass Company.

== See also ==
- National Register of Historic Places listings in Northeast Portland, Oregon
