= David Cole House =

Historic house in Portland, Oregon, U.S.

- U.S. National Register of Historic Places
- Portland Historic Landmark
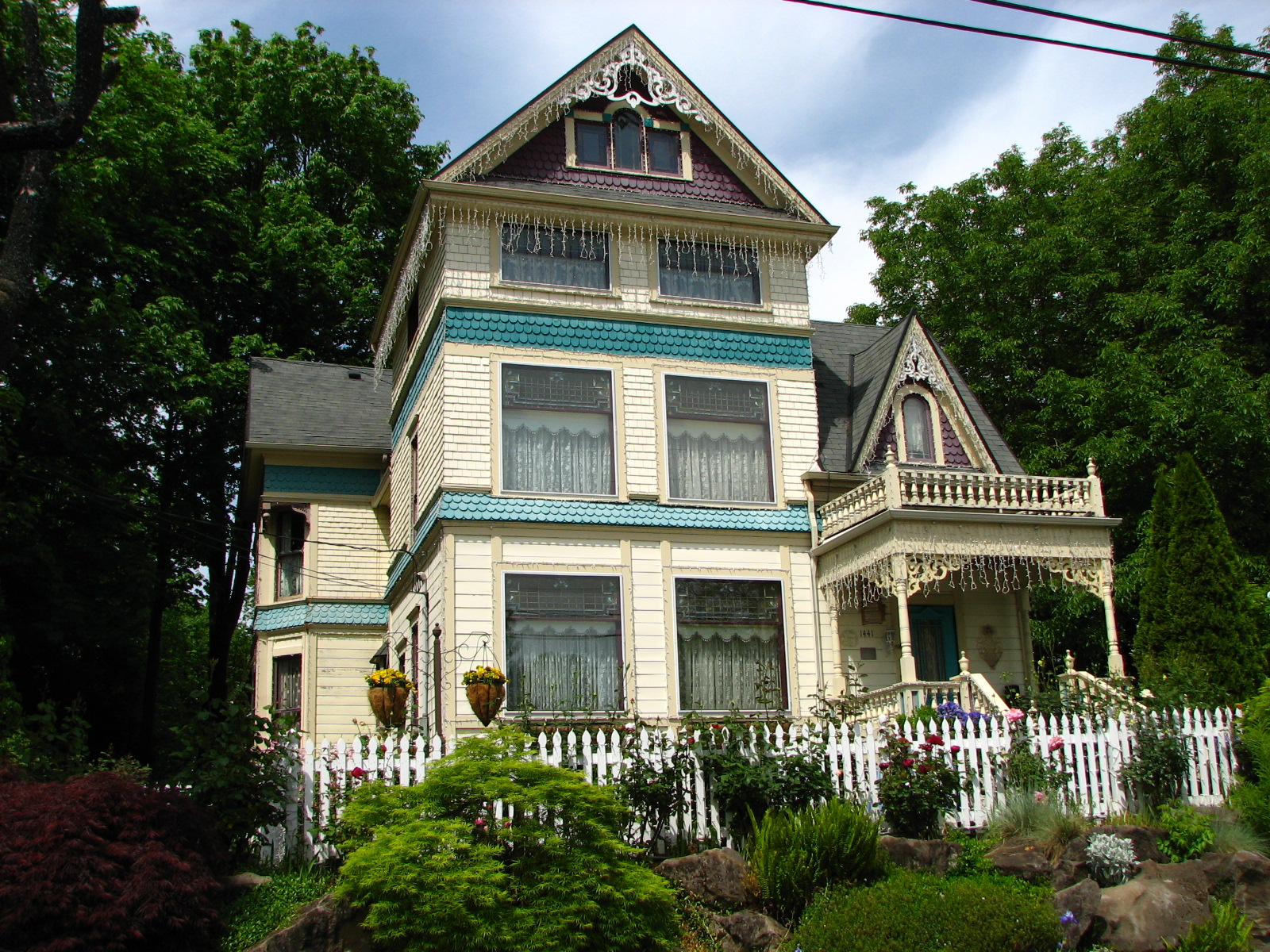
- The house's exterior in 2008

- Location within Portland, Oregon
- Location: 1441 N McClellan St, Portland, Oregon, U.S.
- Coordinates: 45°35′00″N 122°40′56″W
- Built: 1885
- Architectural style: Queen Anne
- NRHP reference No.: 80003361
- Added to NRHP: August 6, 1980

The David Cole House is a house located in Portland, Oregon, listed on the National Register of Historic Places. The house includes several stained glass windows made by Portland's Povey Brothers Studio. It is in the Kenton neighborhood of North Portland, and operates as an events venues called the Victorian Belle.

== See also ==
- National Register of Historic Places listings in North Portland, Oregon
