= Rufus C. Holman House =

Historic building in Portland, Oregon, U.S.

- U.S. National Register of Historic Places
- Portland Historic Landmark
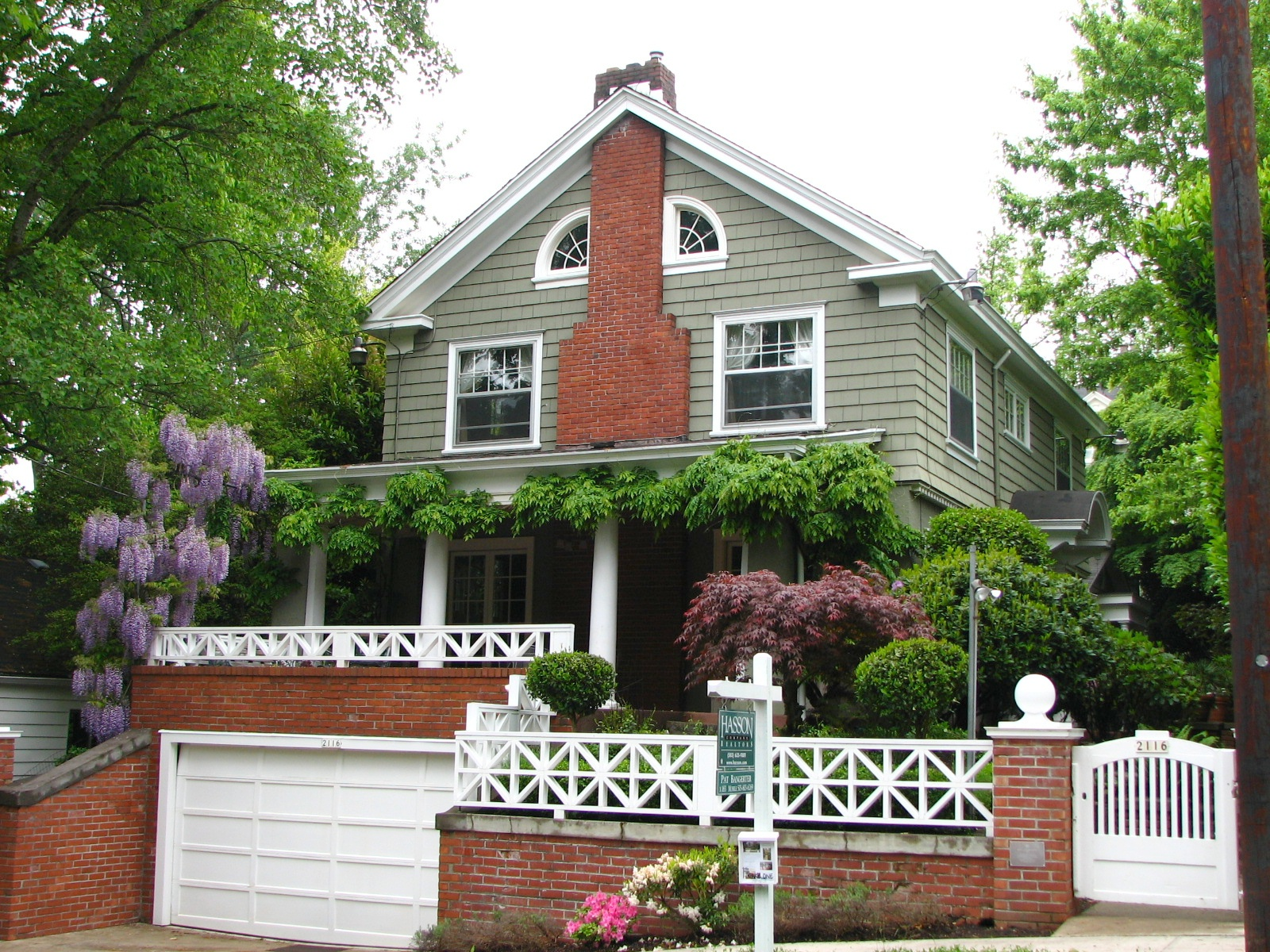

- Location within Portland, Oregon
- Location: 2116 SW Montgomery Drive; Portland, Oregon
- Coordinates: 45°30′44″N 122°41′58″W
- Built: 1913
- Architect: David L. Williams
- Architectural style: Colonial Revival
- NRHP reference No.: 91000147
- Added to NRHP: February 22, 1991

The Rufus C. Holman House is a house located in southwest Portland, Oregon, listed on the National Register of Historic Places. It is located in the Southwest Hills neighborhood.

It was designed by Portland architect David L. Williams in Colonial Revival style.

== See also ==
- Rufus C. Holman
- National Register of Historic Places listings in Southwest Portland, Oregon
