= Methodist Episcopal Church South (Roseburg, Oregon) =

Historic church in Oregon, United States

- U.S. National Register of Historic Places
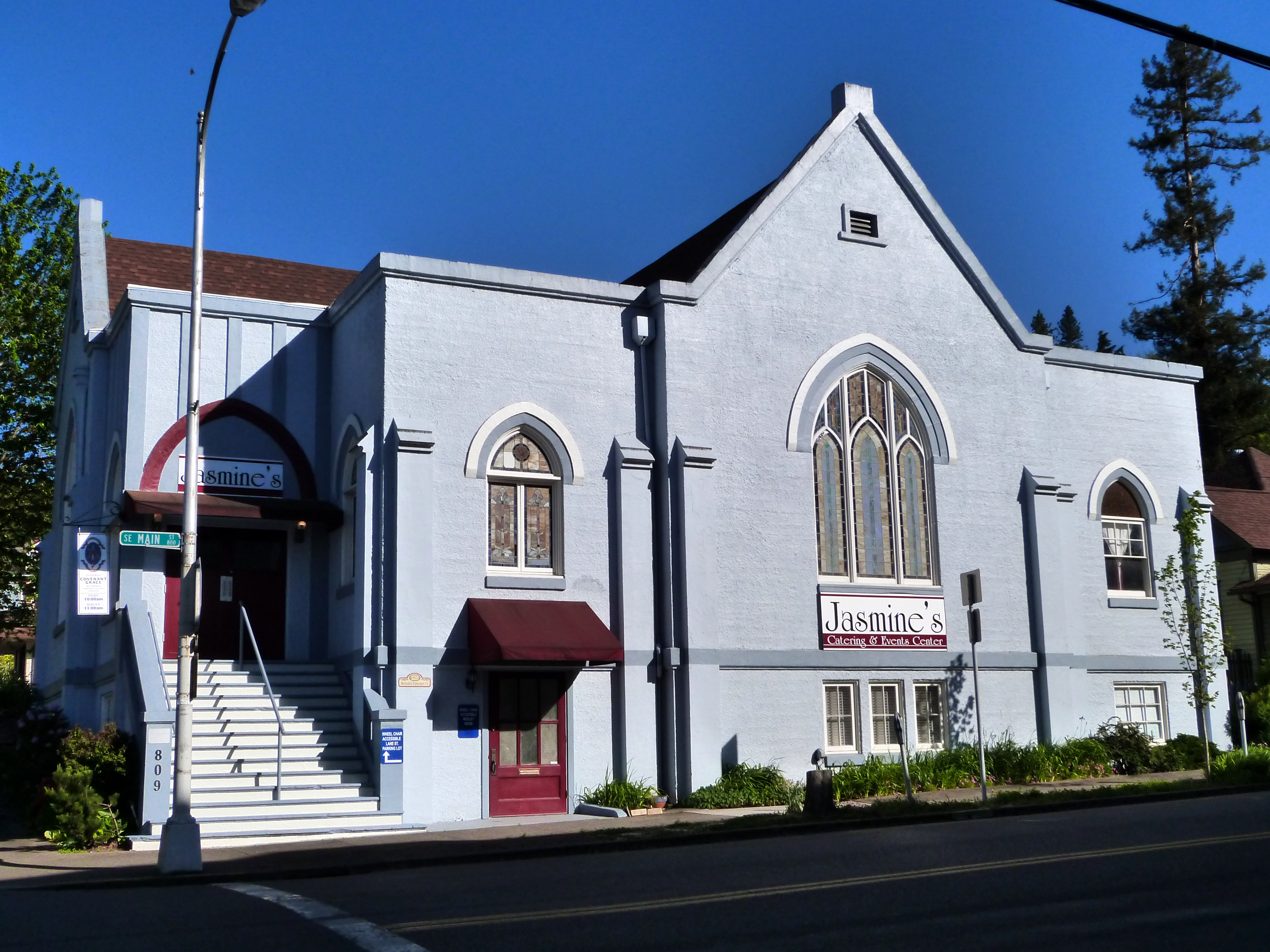
- The Methodist Episcopal Church South in 2013.

- Location within Oregon Location within the United States
- Location: 809 SE Main Street; Roseburg, Oregon
- Coordinates: 43°12′24″N 123°20′41″W
- Area: less than one acre
- Built: 1922
- Architectural style: 20th Century Gothic
- NRHP reference No.: 85001179
- Added to NRHP: June 6, 1985

Methodist Episcopal Church South is a historic former church in Roseburg, Oregon. Completed in 1922, it was added to the National Register of Historic Places in 1985.

The building is constructed of stuccoed, cast concrete. Its interior features stained glass windows crafted by the Povey Brothers, three of which are large. Some of these windows were damaged in a 1959 chemical truck explosion that leveled eight blocks of the city and extensively damaged many buildings. As of 1974, only one of the large windows remained in its original condition.
