= Lewis and Elizabeth Van Vleet House =

Historic house in Oregon, United States

- U.S. National Register of Historic Places
- Portland Historic Landmark
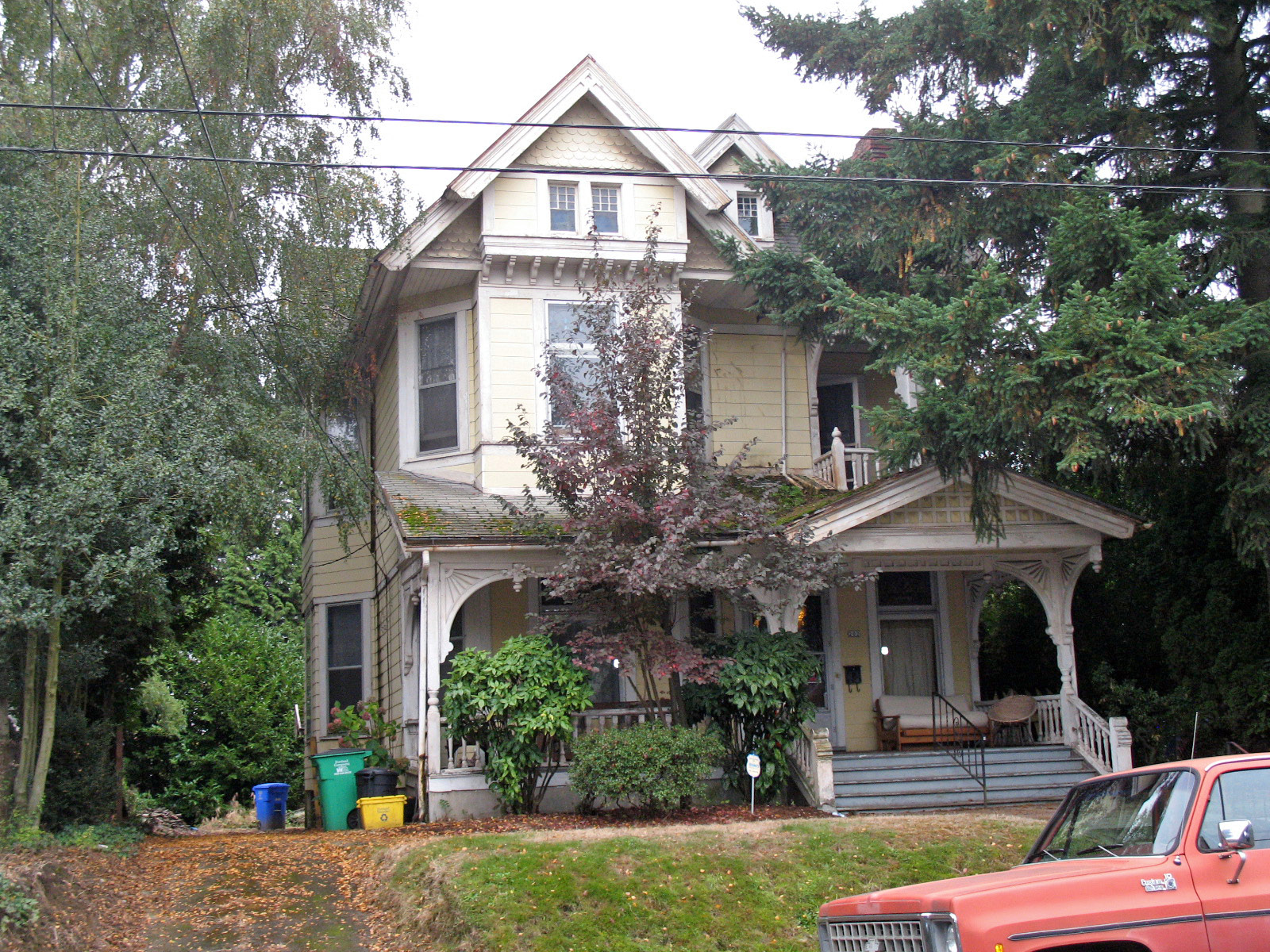
- The house in 2009

- Location within the United States Location within Oregon Location within Portland, Oregon
- Location: 202 NE Graham Street; Portland, Oregon
- Coordinates: 45°32′33″N 122°39′48″W
- Built: 1894
- Architect: unknown
- Architectural style: Queen Anne
- MPS: Eliot Neighborhood MPS
- NRHP reference No.: 01000937
- Added to NRHP: September 3, 2001

The Lewis and Elizabeth Van Vleet House, also known as the Yee House, is a historic building located in the Eliot neighborhood of Portland, Oregon, United States, on the plat of the former town of Albina. Built in 1894, it was the home of Lewis Van Vleet (1826–1910), the United States Deputy Surveyor for the Pacific Northwest for 40 years, among other accomplishments. Starting in 1956, it was the home of Rozelle Jackson Yee (1913–2000), a leader in the African American community who was active in promoting neighborhood involvement in the redevelopment projects that vastly altered the Albina area in the latter half of the 20th century. (Note: Notable redevelopment and urban renewal projects that impacted the Albina area include the expansion of Emanuel Hospital, the construction of Interstate 5 and the Fremont Bridge, and the construction of Memorial Coliseum.) (Note: Rozelle Jackson Yee and her husband Loy Sing Yee faced additional challenges as an interracial couple. For instance, they were forced to marry in Washington due to legal restrictions in Oregon.) The house is architecturally important as a high expression of the Queen Anne style with extensive stained glass windows from the prominent Povey Brothers Studio. It is one of relatively few vintage houses in Albina to survive the period of redevelopment projects.

The house was entered on the National Register of Historic Places in 2001.

== See also ==
- National Register of Historic Places listings in Northeast Portland, Oregon
