= Congress Center =

Skyscraper in Portland, Oregon, US

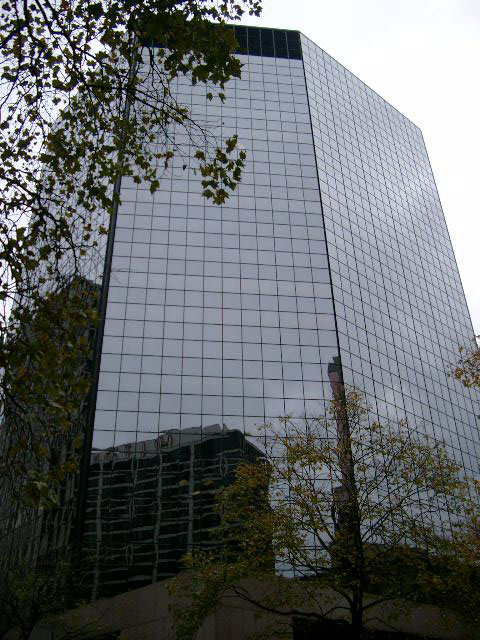
- Congress Center reflecting the Portland Hilton Hotel

- Location within Portland, Oregon
- Former names: Orbanco Building (1980–89); Security Pacific Plaza (1989–94); 1001 Fifth Avenue (1994–2001)

General information
- Type: Commercial offices
- Location: 1001 SW Fifth Avenue; Portland, Oregon
- Coordinates: 45.5165°N 122.6796°W
- Completed: 1980
- Owner: American Realty Advisors; Unico Properties LLC

Height
- Roof: 97.84 m (321.0 ft)

Technical details
- Floor count: 23

Design and construction
- Architects: Skidmore, Owings & Merrill; Yost Grube Hall PC

Congress Center (formerly the Orbanco Building and Security Pacific Plaza) is an office building completed in 1980 in Portland, Oregon. It is currently the fifteenth tallest building in the city. The building's current name dates to January 2002.

== History ==
Construction began in 1978 and was completed in 1980. It was named the Orbanco Building, for its largest tenant, Orbanco Inc., which at the time of groundbreaking was set to lease around 30 percent of the space. That company's two largest subsidiaries, Oregon Bank (established in 1887) and Northwest Acceptance Corporation, were set to be headquartered in the building. Oregon Bank moved to the new building from another downtown location in March 1980. The building earned Gold Leadership in Energy and Environmental Design (LEED) certification from the U.S. Green Building Council in 2012 for its sustainability. American Realty Advisors and Unico Properties LLC purchased the building in December 2016 for $85 million from Shorenstein Properties.

== Design ==
The firm of Skidmore, Owings & Merrill (SOM) designed what is now Congress Center, with reflective dark glass that contrasts with the mostly white or lighter colored architecture common in Portland's architectural history. However, the highly reflective surface of Congress Center's glass curtain walls reflect all the nearby buildings. Most notable are 1000 Broadway, the Portland Building and Multnomah County Courthouse.

== Name ==
The current name is the fourth name the building has carried. Opened in 1980 as the Orbanco Building, it was renamed Security Pacific Plaza in April 1989, as the building housed the Oregon headquarters of Security Pacific Bank, which had acquired Oregon Bank in 1987. Security Pacific was taken over by Bank of America in 1992, and in 1994 Security Pacific Plaza was renamed "1001 Fifth Avenue", a condensed version of the building's address. That name gave way to the current one, Congress Center, in January 2002. This name is taken from the former Congress Hotel, located on the site from 1912 until 1977. Terracotta arches from the Congress Hotel were restored for use as an entry to a lower level restaurant.

== See also ==
- Architecture of Portland, Oregon
- List of tallest buildings in Portland, Oregon
