= Polly Povey Thompson =

American architect (born 1904)

- Born: Lillian Myrtle Povey; December 27, 1904; Portland, Oregon
- Died: June 26, 1994 (aged 89); Portland, Oregon
- Resting place: River View Cemetery, Portland, Multnomah County, Oregon, USA
- Education: Massachusetts Institute of Technology; University of Oregon
- Notable work: Alpha Omicron Pi Sorority House, University of Oregon; Ray F. Mooers Residence, Cathlamet, Washington
- Spouse: Raymond Kermit Thompson
- Elected: American Institute of Architects

"Polly" Povey Thompson (1904–1994) was among the earliest American woman architects to become a member of the American Institute of Architects. She was a registered architect in both Massachusetts and Oregon, and collaborated with her husband as a principal in their firm for forty years.

== Early life and education ==
The daughter of David Lincoln Povey and Hanna Povey, Lilian Myrtle "Polly" Povey was born December 27, 1904, in Portland, Oregon. Her father was a founder of the Povey Brothers Glass Company, and she worked in the studio there before attending the University of Oregon from 1927–1929. In 1928, she worked at the Portland architecture firm of DeYoung and Roald. She met Ray Thompson at the University, and they eloped in 1929.

The Thompsons lived in Idaho, Denver, and St. Louis, before moving to New York. She worked in St. Louis as a secretary for the director of the St. Louis Art League, and in New York she was an artist/secretary for a large bakery. They returned to Oregon, where she earned a B.A. Arch. with Honors at the University of Oregon in 1935. She was a Frances and William Emerson scholar at the Massachusetts Institute of Technology in 1937–1938, and earned a B.Arch. there in 1938.

== Career ==
In 1929, Thompson was a drafter for Temple H. Buell, AIA, in Denver. In the 1930s, she worked in Boston with a classmate from M.I.T., Archie Riskin, and registered as an architect in Massachusetts in 1943. Her registration in Oregon came ten years later, as a principal in the firm Polly Povey Thompson, Ray Kermit Thompson, Architects. From 1953 to 1993, the Thompsons collaborated on projects, with each preparing design solutions, and they critiqued each other's proposals to arrive at solutions.

== Legacy ==
Some of her significant projects included the Alpha Omicron Pi sorority House remodel at the University of Oregon; the Ray F. Mooers Residence in Cathlamet, Washington; the City Hall and Emergency Building in Culver, Oregon; the Wasco Fire Station in Wasco, Oregon; and a shopping center in Monroe, Connecticut.

== See also ==
- American Architectural Foundation
- Society of American Registered Architects
