= David L. Williams (architect) =

American architect

David Lochead Williams (November 2, 1866 – September 28, 1937) was an architect in Portland, Oregon.

His father was Warren H. Williams, a leading early architect of Portland. Born in San Francisco in 1866, David Williams moved to Portland with his parents and two siblings in either 1873 or 1875.

David Williams "was trained by his father and, when given free reign [sic], as in the Mediterranean mansion of 1912 for lumberman Robert F. Lytle, he produced quite lavish eclectic work in the Beaux Arts tradition." He began working in his father's architectural firm in 1883, upon graduating from high school, and "was engaged in this profession almost continuously" until retiring in 1934 because of illness.

A number of his works are listed on the U.S. National Register of Historic Places (NRHP).

Works include:

- Frank C. Barnes House, 3533 N.E. Klickitat Street, Portland, Oregon; NRHP-listed
- Frank W. Fenton House, 434 N. Evans St., McMinnville, Oregon; NRHP-listed
- Rufus C. Holman House, (1913), 2116 S.W. Montgomery Drive, Portland, Oregon; NRHP-listed
- Clarissa McKeyes Inman House, 2884 N.W. Cumberland, Portland, Oregon; NRHP-listed
- Robert F. Lytle House, 1914 N.E. 22nd Ave., Portland, Oregon; NRHP-listed

== See also ==
- David Williams (Alaska architect), who also has a number of NRHP-listed works
