= Frank C. Barnes House =

Historic building in Portland, Oregon, U.S.

- U.S. National Register of Historic Places
- Portland Historic Landmark
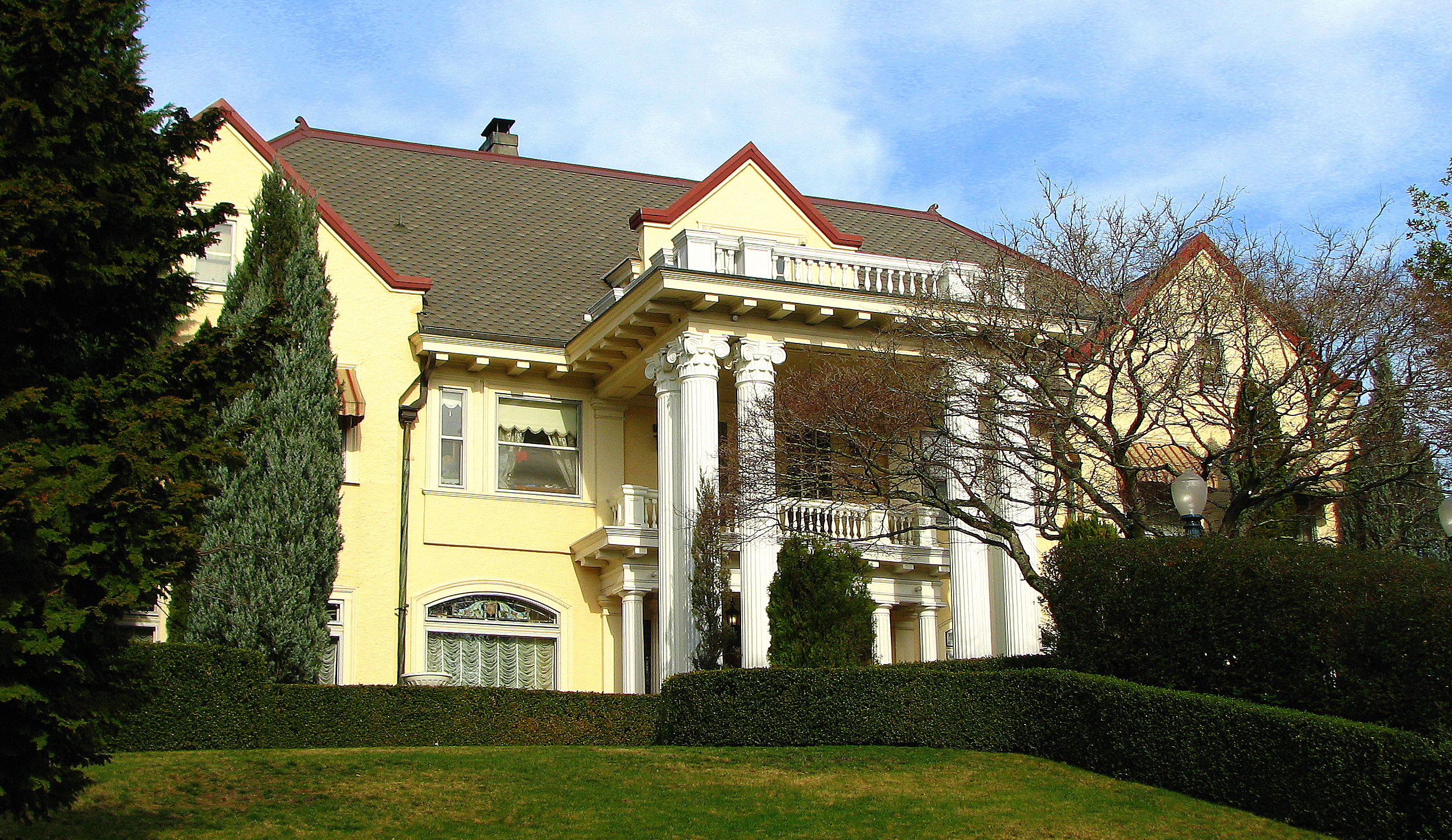
- Frank C. Barnes House in 2010

- Location within Portland, Oregon
- Location: 3533 NE Klickitat Street; Portland, Oregon
- Coordinates: 45°32′49″N 122°37′39″W
- Area: less than one acre
- Built: 1913
- Architect: Stokes & Zeller
- Architectural style: Colonial Revival, Colonial, Jacobethan
- NRHP reference No.: 83002166
- Added to NRHP: September 1, 1983

The Frank C. Barnes House, also known as the Barnes Mansion, is a house located in northeast Portland, Oregon, United States, that is listed on the National Register of Historic Places. Author Beverly Cleary called the house "haunted" in her Ramona Quimby series.

Its design has been tentatively ascribed to Portland architect David L. Williams, but was more recently linked to Stokes & Zeller.

== See also ==
- National Register of Historic Places listings in Northeast Portland, Oregon
