= Railway Exchange Building (Portland, Oregon) =

Historic building in Portland, Oregon, U.S.

- U.S. National Register of Historic Places
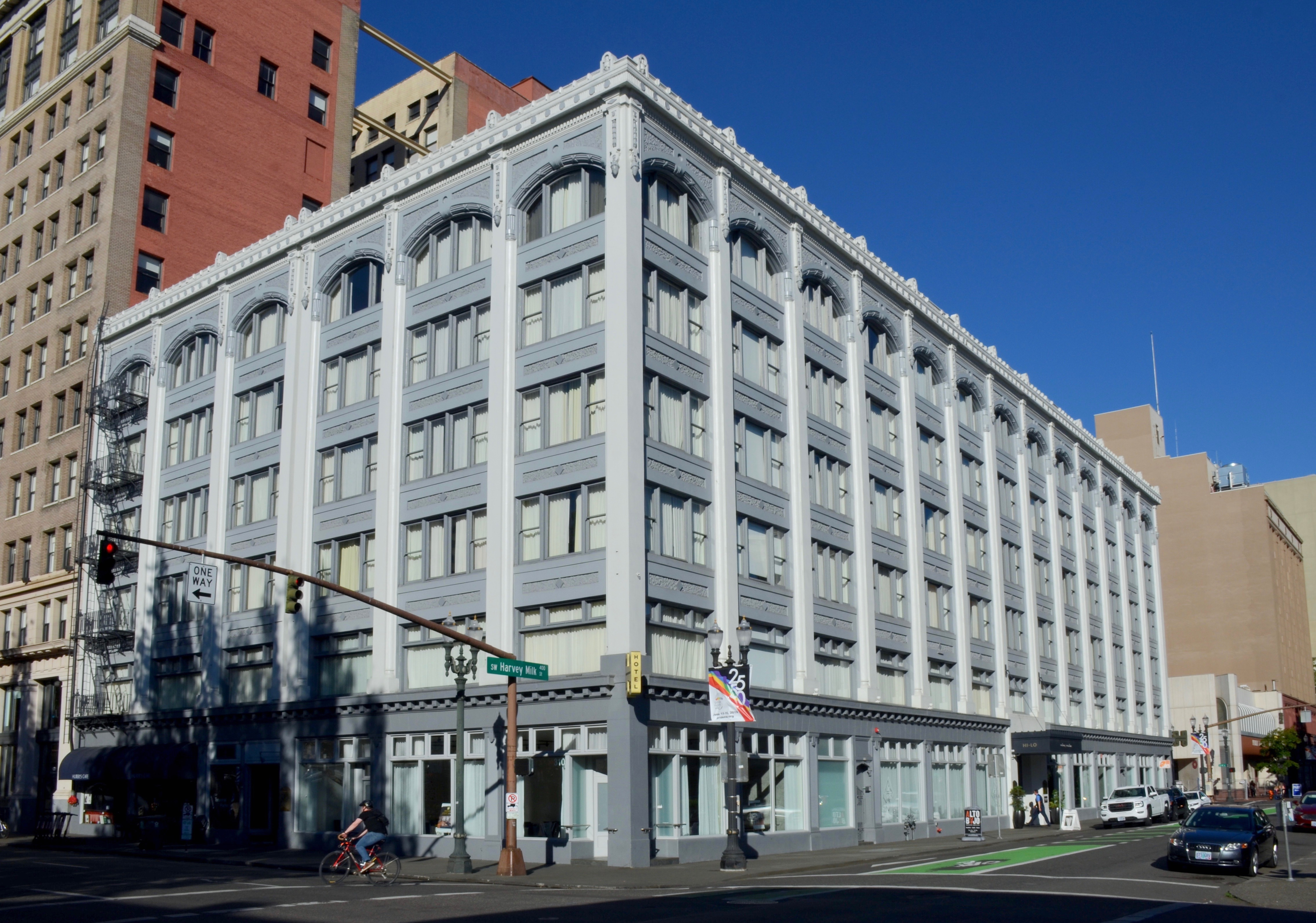
- The building's exterior in 2019

- Location within Portland, Oregon Location within Oregon Location within the United States
- Location: 320 SW Stark Street; Portland, Oregon
- Coordinates: 45°31′13″N 122°40′30″W
- Area: 0.3 acres (0.12 ha)
- Built: 1910
- Architect: David Chambers Lewis, Harry Goodwin Beckwith
- NRHP reference No.: 79002132
- Added to NRHP: March 13, 1979

The Railway Exchange Building is a historic building in Portland, Oregon, also known as the Oregon Pioneer Building. The structure houses the restaurant Huber's.

== Description ==
The six-story reinforced concrete structure has exterior non-bearing walls, a basement with three-foot brick and stone walls, and a composition roof.

== History ==
The structure was built in 1910, marking Portland's first fully concrete building. It later became known as the Builders Exchange Building, then the Oregon Pioneer Building.

The building once housed the Oregon Liquor Control Commission. It has also housed the Peruvian and Venezuelan consulates.

The Railway Exchange Building and Huber's Restaurant were added to the National Register of Historic Places on March 13, 1979.

Marriott International's Autograph Collection debuted the Hi-Lo Hotel in the building in 2017.

== See also ==
- National Register of Historic Places listings in South and Southwest Portland, Oregon
