= Washburne Historic District =

Historic district in Oregon, United States

- U.S. National Register of Historic Places
- U.S. Historic district
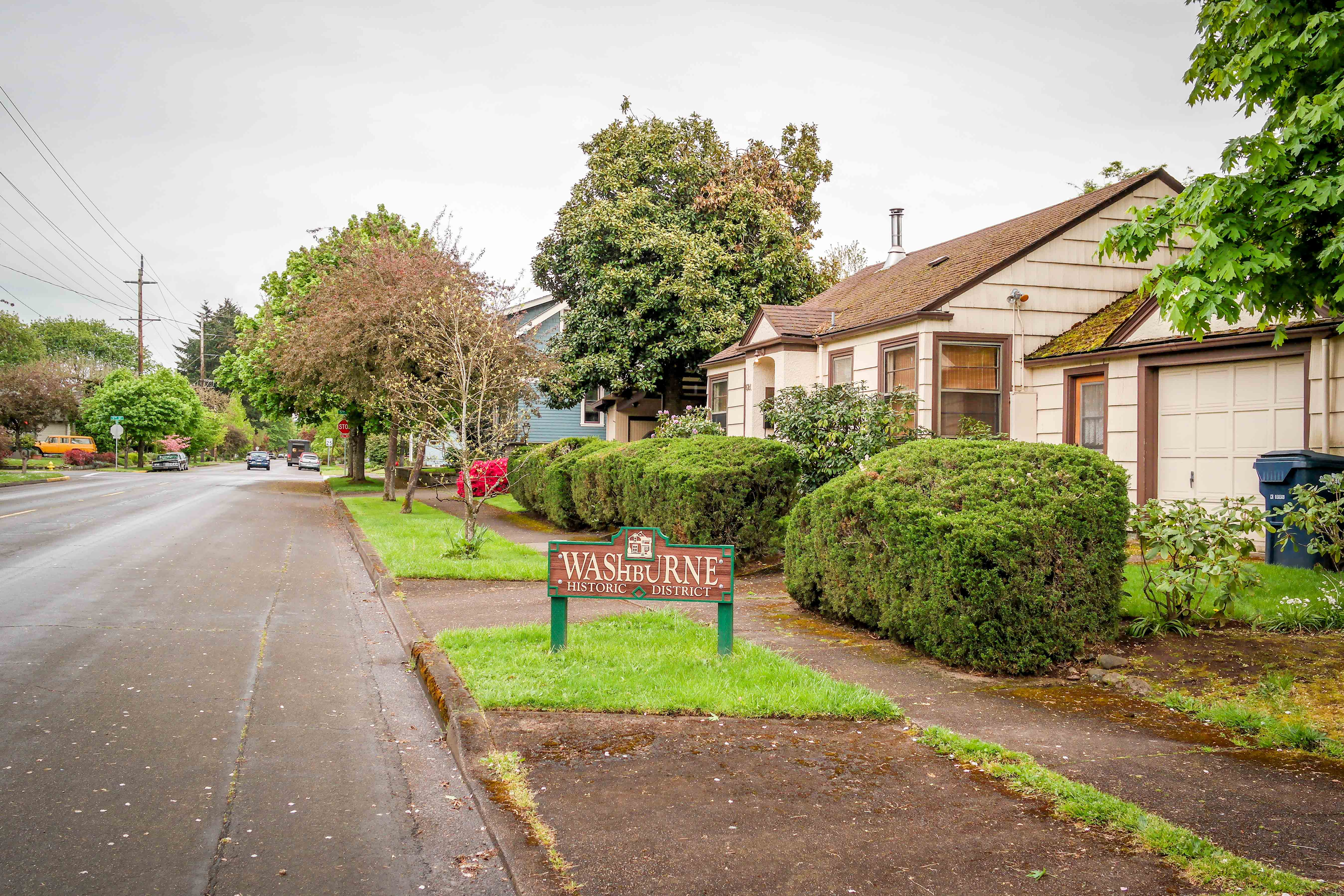
- Entering the Washburne Historic District near 4th and E Streets
- Location: Springfield, Oregon bounded by Pioneer Parkway, A Street, 10th Street, and G Street
- Coordinates: 44°02′53″N 123°01′10″W
- Area: 84 acres (34 ha)
- Architect: Multiple
- NRHP reference No.: 87000042
- Added to NRHP: February 10, 1987

The Washburne Historic District in Springfield, Oregon was established in 1985 and added to the National Register of Historic Places (NRHP) in 1987. The district includes 29 full blocks and five partial blocks, and it is roughly bounded by A Street on the south, G Street on the north, Pioneer Parkway on the west, and 10th Street on the east. Its total area encompasses 84 acres.

Springfield General Hospital, now an apartment building within the district, is individually listed on the NRHP.

== History ==
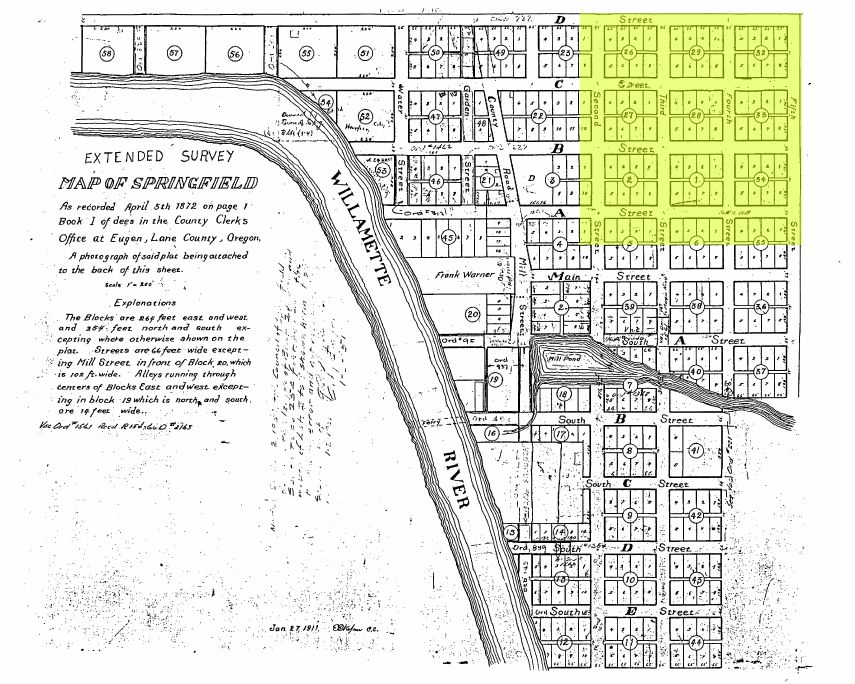
An 1872 map of Springfield, Oregon. The highlighted area shows what would later become the southwest quarter of the Washburne Historic District

Named for banker and flour mill owner C.W. Washburne, the Washburne Historic District is part of an 1852 Donation Land Claim by Springfield founder Elias Briggs. The grid style blocks were platted from surveys between 1872 and 1890. Nearly 44 percent of surviving structures were completed between 1890 and 1915. Most of the district included paved streets and sidewalks by the mid-1920s.

== Classification of buildings ==
The district includes five classes of buildings:

- Primary significant: built 1890 - 1915, 136 structures
- Secondary significant: built 1916 - 1930, 98 structures
- Compatible/contributing: built 1930 - 1940, 12 structures
- Compatible/non-contributing:

built after 1940 and consistent with the character of the district
built 1890 - 1940 but substantially altered by renovation, 80 total

- Intrusion/non-contributing: non-historic structures irrelevant to the building traditions in the district, 9 structures
