= Benjamin Wistar Morris (architect) =

American architect (1870–1944)

Benjamin Wistar Morris III
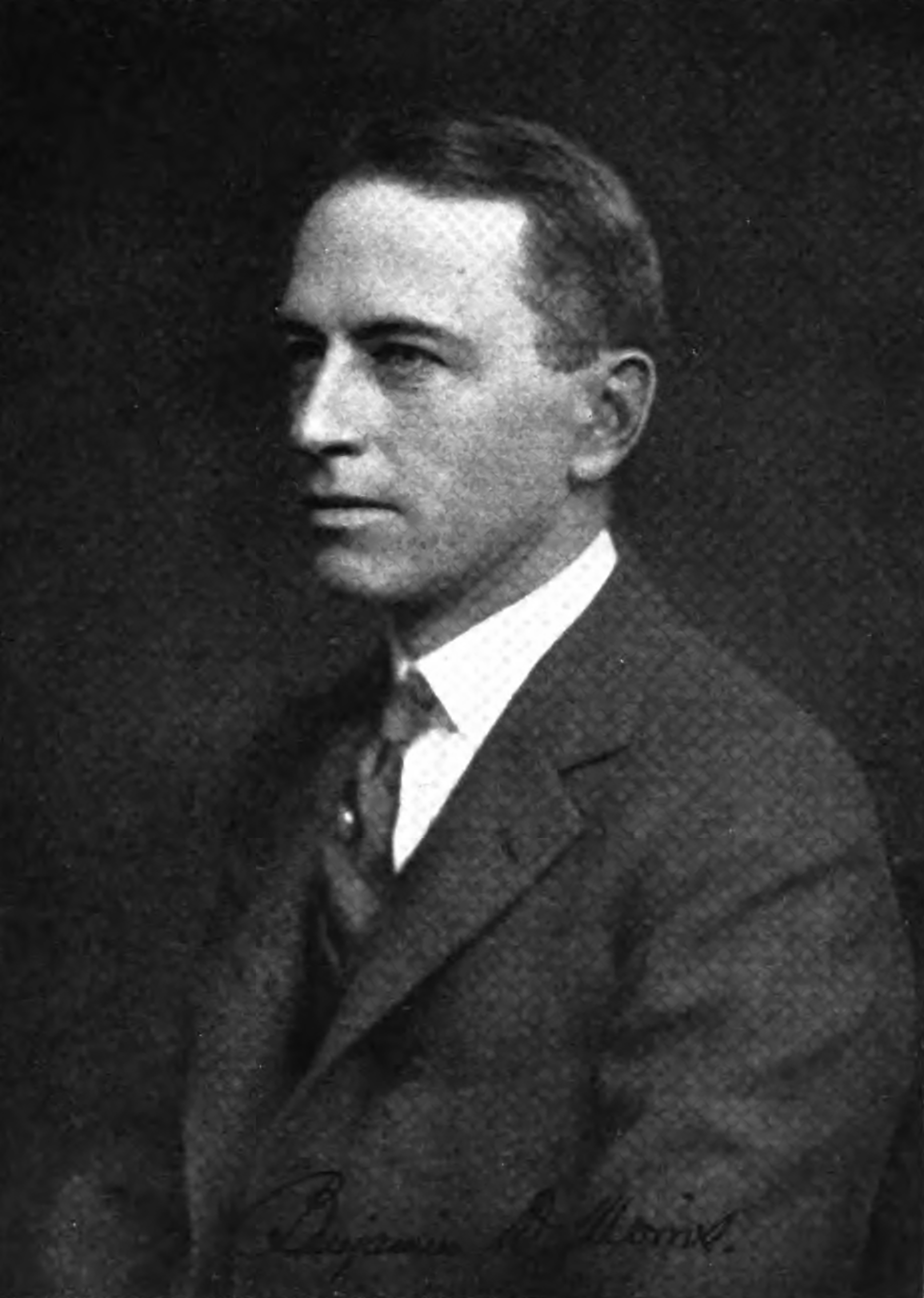
- Morris in 1925
- Born: October 23, 1870; Portland, Oregon, U.S.
- Died: December 4, 1944 (aged 74); New York City, New York, U.S.
- Burial place: Cedar Hill Cemetery (Hartford, Connecticut)
- Education: Columbia University
- Occupation: Architect
- Spouse: Alice Fenwick Goodwin
- Children: 2

Benjamin Wistar Morris (sometimes III or Jr.; October 23, 1870 – December 4, 1944) was an American architect from Oregon who worked primarily in New York City.

== Early life and education ==
Morris was born in Portland, Oregon on October 23, 1870, to Benjamin Wistar Morris, Episcopal Bishop of Oregon and Washington, and his wife Hannah. He attended the Bishop Scott Academy in Oregon, and then St. Paul's Preparatory School in Concord, New Hampshire. Intending to become a minister, he attended Trinity College in Hartford, Connecticut, but he later decided to become an architect and graduated from Columbia University in 1894. In 1895 and 1896 he continued his studies at the École des Beaux-Arts in Paris. Upon his return to the United States, Morris joined the firm of Carrère and Hastings, where he assisted in preparing the successful entry for the design of the New York Public Library.

== Professional life ==
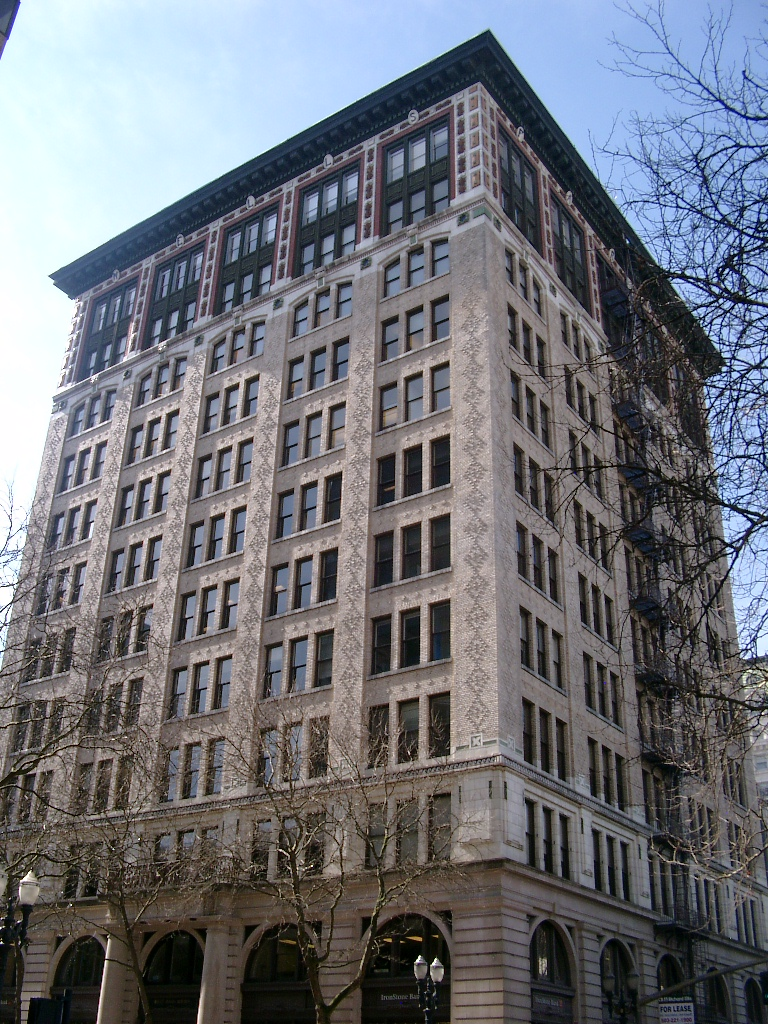
Morris designed the Wells Fargo Building, the first skyscraper in Portland, Oregon

Morris started his own practice in 1900. He later formed the firm of Morris, Butler and Rodman, but soon withdrew from the practice and worked alone until 1910, when he formed a partnership with Christopher Grant LaFarge as LaFarge & Morris. That firm lasted until 1915. Morris later formed Morris & O'Connor with his son-in-law, Robert B. O'Connor. Morris worked with O'Connor until Morris' death in 1944.

In 1913, Morris was elected a Fellow of the American Institute of Architects (AIA), serving as president of the New York chapter. He also served on the New York City Art Commission, and was a member of the U.S. Commission of Fine Arts from 1927 to 1931. Morris became a full Academician in the National Academy of Design in 1941.

== Works ==
In his native Portland, Morris designed the Wells Fargo Building in 1907. It is considered the city's first skyscraper. He designed many important buildings in Connecticut and New York, including the Cunard Building (with Carrère and Hastings), the Union League Club of New York, and 48 Wall Street, as well as the interiors of the Queen Mary and the Harmonie Club. In addition, he designed residences in Clinton Hill, Brooklyn and Long Island for watch case manufacturer Joseph Fahys.

== Later life and death ==
Morris died on December 4, 1944, in New York City; he was survived by his wife, Alice Fenwick Goodwin, daughter Mary Wistar O'Connor, and son Benjamin. He was interred at Cedar Hill Cemetery in Hartford, Connecticut.
