= John Ross Tower =

Residential building in Portland, Oregon, U.S.

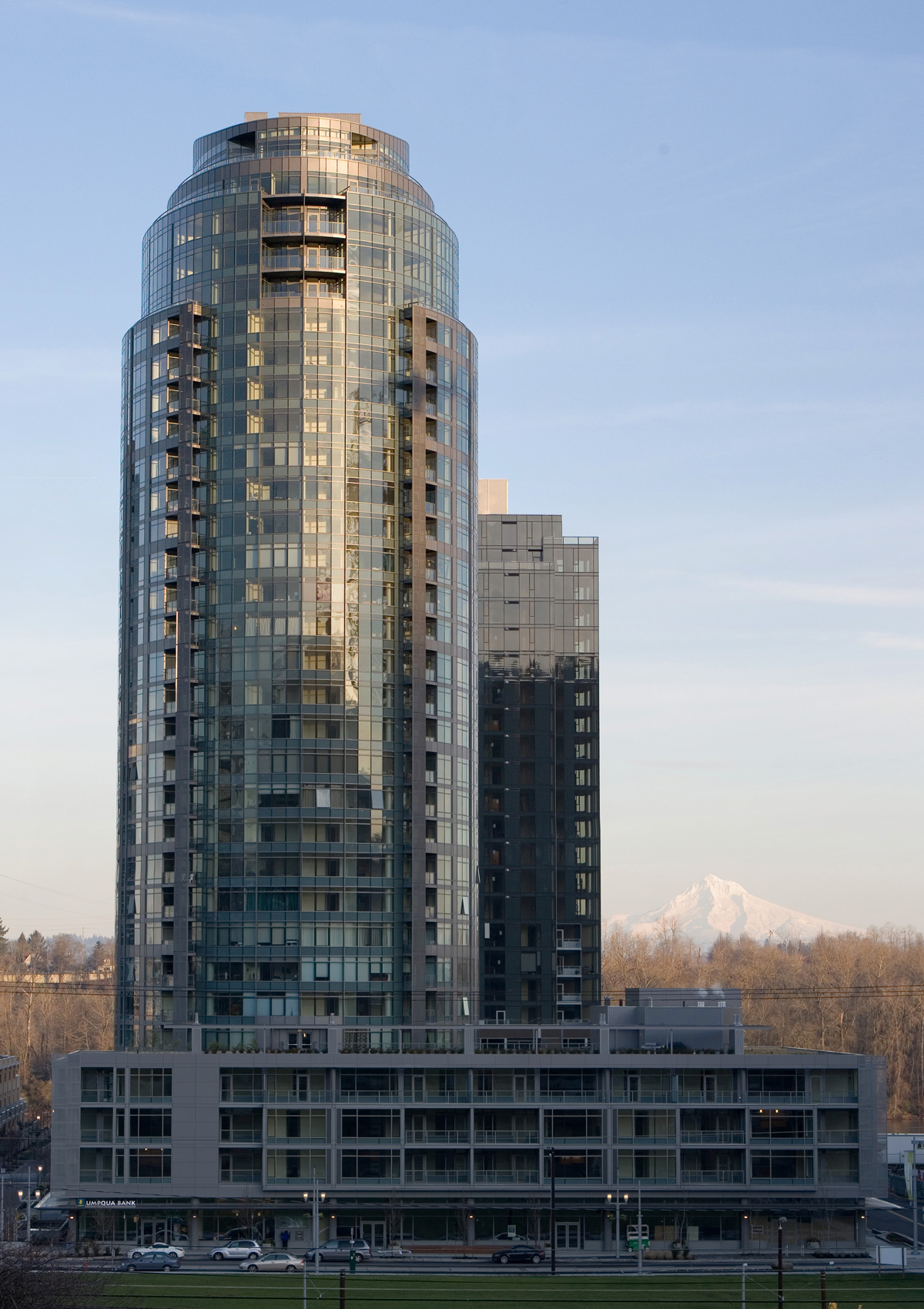

- Location within Portland, Oregon

General information
- Type: Residential
- Location: 3601 SW River Parkway; Portland, Oregon
- Coordinates: 45.496729°N 122.670218°W
- Construction started: 2005
- Completed: 2007
- Cost: US$130 million

Height
- Roof: 99.1 m (325 ft)

Technical details
- Floor count: 31

Design and construction
- Architect: TVA Architects
- Developer: Gerding Edlen, Williams & Dame
- Main contractor: Hoffman Construction

John Ross Tower is a condominium skyscraper in the South Waterfront neighborhood in Portland, Oregon. It stands at a height of 99.1 m (325 ft), the first building in the district to reach the maximum height allowed for development and Portland's seventh-tallest building. It is also the largest residential building built in Portland since the KOIN Center in 1984. It was designed by the firm of TVA Architects and topped out in 2007. The Oregonian called it the "symbol of condo craze" in Portland, with sales opening "at the height of the condo bubble" in 2005.

The building contains 31 elliptical-shaped floors and 303 units. The topmost penthouse occupies the entire 31st floor and allows for a full 360 degree view. As of March 2010, 80 units were unsold, and 50 were sold at an auction in April 2010, some at a 70% discount from their original asking price.

== See also ==
- Architecture of Portland, Oregon
- List of tallest buildings in Portland, Oregon
