= Wells Fargo Center (Portland, Oregon) =

Office building in Portland, Oregon

- The Wells Fargo Center in 2012

- Location within Portland, Oregon
- Former names: First National Bank Tower; First Interstate Bank Tower
- Alternative names: Block 148

General information
- Type: Commercial offices
- Location: 1300 SW 5th Avenue; Portland, Oregon; 350 SW Jefferson Street; Portland, Oregon
- Coordinates: 45.514356°N 122.679359°W
- Construction started: 1969
- Completed: 1972
- Owner: Starwood Capital Group

Height
- Roof: 546 ft (166 m)

Technical details
- Floor count: Tower: 41; 3 below ground DP Building: 6; 3 below ground
- Floor area: 567,830 ft^{2} (52,753 m^{2})
- Lifts/elevators: 19

Design and construction
- Architect: Charles Luckman

Website
- www.wellsfargocenterportland.com

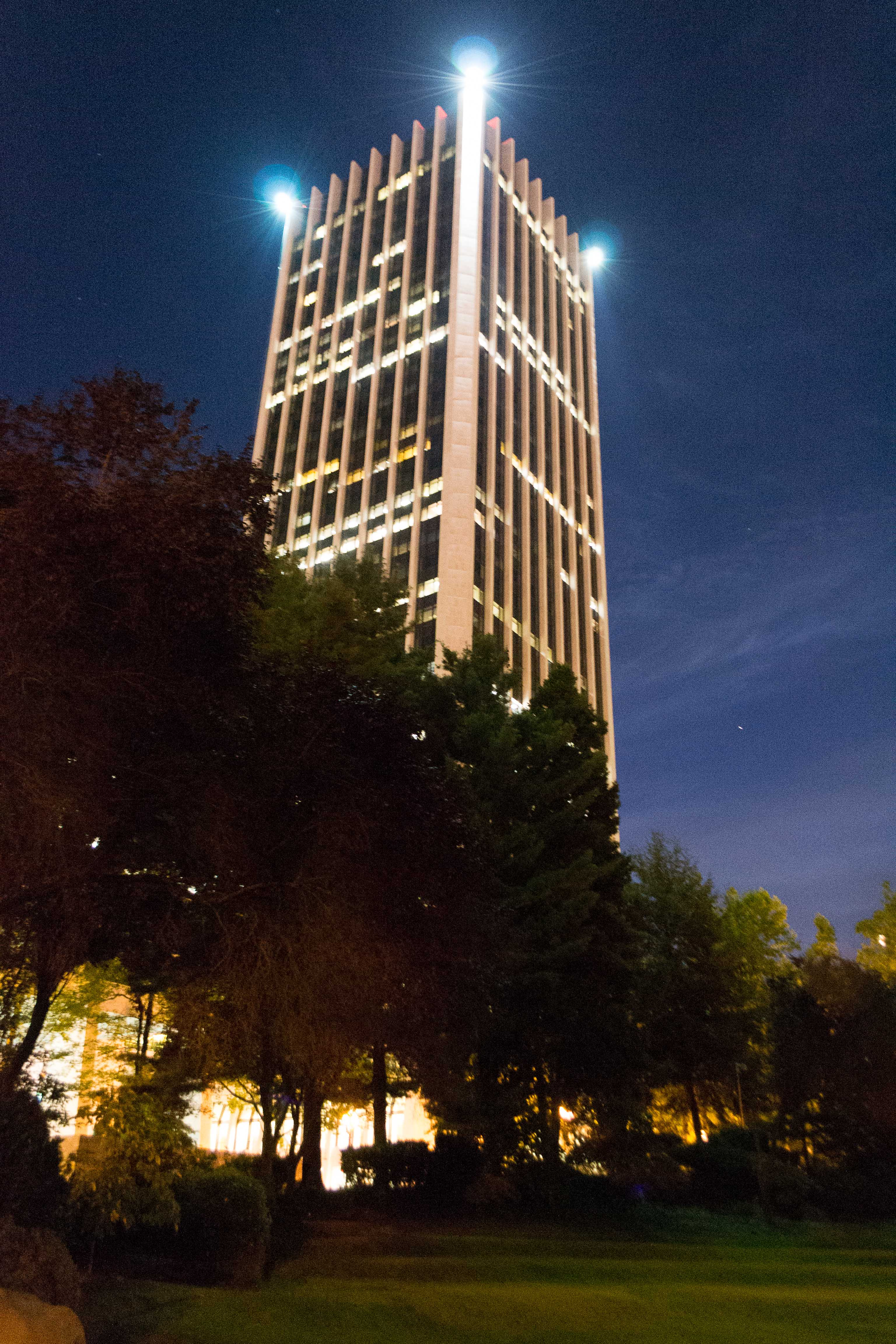
Portland's Wells Fargo Center at night

Wells Fargo Center is a 40-story, 546 ft (166 m) tower and adjoining five-story office building with three basement parking levels in Portland, Oregon. The tower became the tallest building in the state of Oregon when it was completed in 1972.

== History ==
The building and a connected five-story building were designed by Charles Luckman and Associates. Originally named the First National Bank Tower, the building opened on April 17, 1972, and was formally dedicated on May 25, 1972. At that time, the bank occupied the first 21 floors of the tower and the entire connected, five-story building, which is known as the Data Processing Building. The name was changed to the First Interstate Tower in 1980–81, after Western Bancorporation, the parent of First National Bank of Oregon, changed its name to First Interstate Bancorp. The current name was adopted after Wells Fargo purchased First Interstate in 1996. Upon opening in 1972, the Wells Fargo Center dwarfed all other buildings in downtown Portland. Public outcry over the tower's scale and the potential of new development to block views of Mount Hood led to height restrictions on all new development.

The public areas underwent extensive renovation in 2001, including the addition of more retail space. Renovations were completed in 2002 at a cost of $35 million. Focused on the lobby area, the work included the addition of a display on the bank's history. The center had been the headquarters of Willamette Industries until 2003, when that company was bought by Weyerhaeuser. In November 2017, Starwood Capital Group purchased the tower and adjacent carriage building from Wells Fargo.

== Details ==
Wells Fargo Center contains the regional headquarters of Wells Fargo Bank. The tower is located in Downtown Portland, in the block bounded by Southwest Fourth and Fifth Avenues between Southwest Columbia and Jefferson Streets. A skyway connects the tower to the adjacent five-story Data Processing Building, which is also part of the Wells Fargo Center. The 40-story building is the tallest building in Oregon, and the third largest office building with 577,339 square feet (53,636.5 m^{2}). The main bank lobby is home to an authentic 1870 stagecoach from Wells Fargo's past.

Architectural details include extensive use of marble. There is a total of 60,000 square feet (5,600 m^{2}) of white Italian marble, 3/4-inch-thick (19 mm) thick. The exterior of the building has columns of bronze-tinted glass, white Italian marble, and anodized aluminum running the entire height of the building.

== Reception ==
The design of the building has been criticized for a variety of architectural issues. Ivan Doig, writing about Portland for The New York Times in 1976, stated the building was "huge and sleek and featureless".

== Museum ==
A branch of the Wells Fargo History Museum used to be located in the building's lobby. The museum's exhibits included an 1854 stagecoach, telegraph and mining equipment, and displays about the company's use of steamboats along the Columbia and Willamette Rivers.

== See also ==
- List of tallest buildings by U.S. state
- Architecture of Portland, Oregon
- List of tallest buildings in Portland, Oregon
