= United States National Bank Building =

Historic building in Portland, Oregon, U.S.

- U.S. National Register of Historic Places
- Portland Historic Landmark
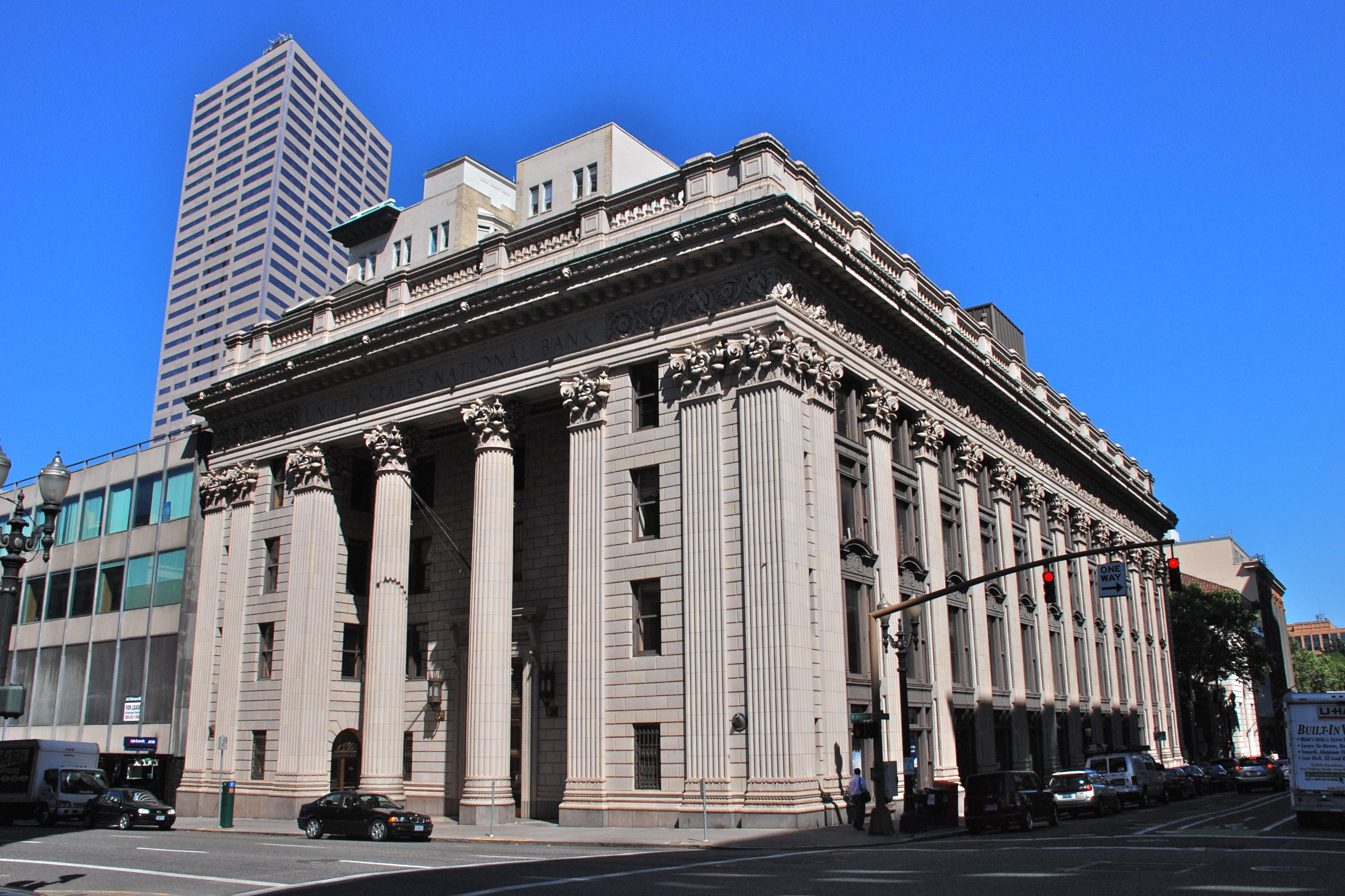
- The building's exterior, viewed from the west, at the intersection of Broadway and Stark (2011)

- Location within Portland, Oregon Location within Oregon Location within the United States
- Location: 321 SW 6th Avenue; Portland, Oregon
- Coordinates: 45°31′17″N 122°40′41″W
- Built: 1917
- Architect: A. E. Doyle, et al.
- Architectural style: Classical; American Renaissance
- NRHP reference No.: 86002842
- Added to NRHP: October 9, 1986

The United States National Bank Building in downtown Portland, Oregon was designed by A. E. Doyle in a Roman classical style, and is listed on the National Register of Historic Places. The four-story building's first section, facing Sixth Avenue, was completed and opened in 1917. The building features a four-story Corinthian colonnade at its eastern end (originally the principal façade) and makes extensive use of glazed terracotta. The interior is also decorated extensively with highly textured materials.

The building was constructed for the United States National Bank of Portland (USNB), which ultimately became part of U.S. Bancorp, whose retail banking division operates as U.S. Bank. An extension westward to Broadway was added in 1925, approximately doubling the building's size such that it now occupies half a city block. It continues to serve as the bank's main branch in the city.

== History ==
The United States National Bank of Portland, the predecessor of present-day U.S. Bancorp, was established in Portland in 1890, opening for business in February 1891. During the following three decades, the bank experienced significant growth. It weathered the Panic of 1893 better than many of its competitors, and later acquired some of the competing Portland banks, including the Ainsworth National Bank (in 1902), the Wells Fargo Bank (in 1905), and the Lumbermen's National Bank (in 1917). With the 1902 acquisition, U.S. National Bank moved its headquarters into a larger space formerly occupied by Ainsworth National, in the Ainsworth Building, then located at S.W. Third and Stark streets in downtown Portland. By the 1910s, the bank had outgrown its space. The firm purchased a quarter-block of land at the northwest corner of Sixth and Stark streets in early 1916 and hired Portland architect A. E. Doyle to design a new, dedicated headquarters building.

Construction began in 1916 and was completed in 1917; the building opened to the public on July 30, 1917. Although the building now extends a full block along Stark Street, with entrances on both 6th Avenue and Broadway, it originally faced only 6th Street (now 6th Avenue) and extended only about halfway to Broadway.

Viewed from the southeast before and after the 1925 expansion

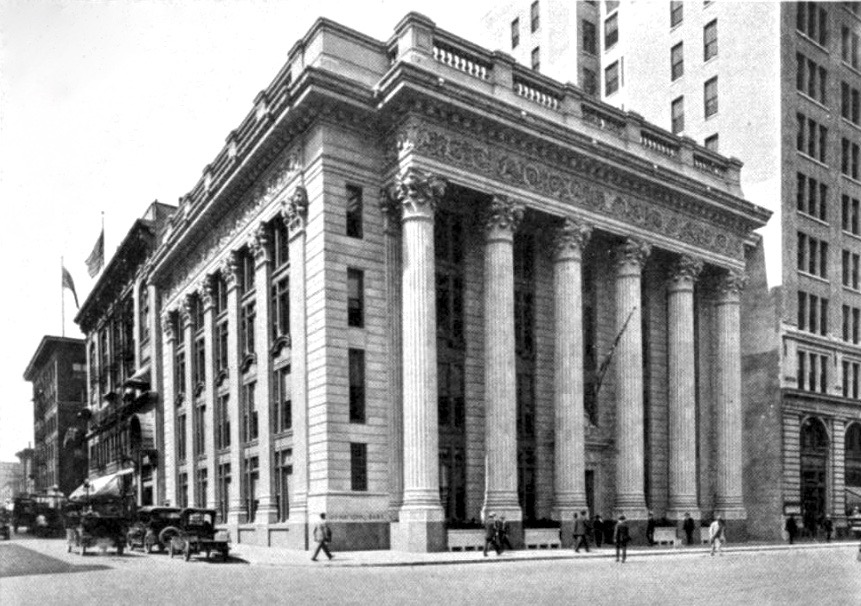
The building circa 1920, when its only entrance was on 6th Avenue and the building was only half its current size

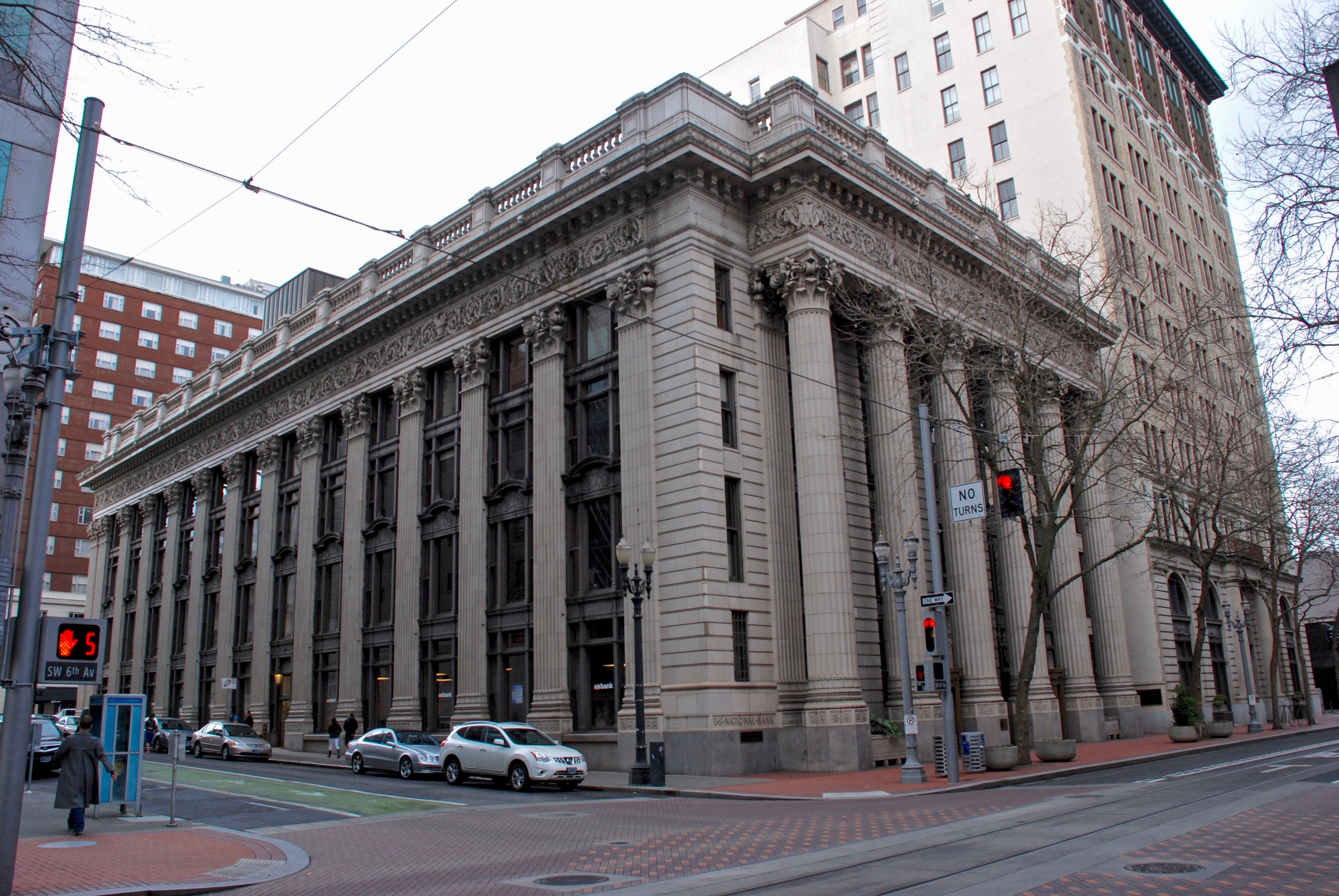
Seen from a similar angle in 2013. In the righthand background of both photos is the 1907-built Wells Fargo Building, which U.S. National Bank acquired in 1946.

In 1922 (another source says 1920), the bank purchased the building that had occupied the quarter-block immediately to the west from the Elks organization which would allow the 1917 bank building to be expanded west to Broadway. (The Elks were preparing to move to a new building elsewhere in downtown.) Originally, a new 24-story building was planned for the site, but the bank ultimately decided to expand its existing building, keeping the same design and height for the new section. Shortly after demolition of the old Elks Building in early 1924, construction of the bank building's expansion began. The new section opened in 1925, doubling the building's size and adding an entrance on Broadway. Doyle was hired again to oversee the expansion, which helped to ensure that the new section would replicate the style of the original section as much as possible, making the expanded building look as though it were built as a single structure, rather than in two stages separated by eight years. In the same year, U.S. National Bank of Portland acquired the Ladd & Tilton Bank, which had been established in 1859, and was the first financial institution in the Pacific Northwest. This acquisition made USNB "the largest financial institution north of San Francisco and west of Minneapolis".

In 1946, U.S. National purchased the Wells Fargo Building (since 1922 known as the Porter Building), a multistory office building located directly adjacent, immediately to the north, to expand its downtown Portland headquarters. United States National Bank of Portland changed its name to United States National Bank of Oregon in 1964. By 1970, the bank was operating 119 branches. At that time, it announced plans for another major expansion of its headquarters on property it had acquired diagonally across from the Wells Fargo Building. The entire oversize block, bounded by 5th and 6th Avenues, and Oak and Burnside Streets, had been acquired, its existing buildings to be razed and replaced by new U.S. National Bank buildings. The first of these was a seven-story building (the U.S. Bank Plaza, at 5th & Oak), completed in 1974. But the headline structure was the U.S. Bancorp Tower, a 42-story building that opened in 1983 (having already been part of the bank's long-term site plans in 1970, but ultimately delayed until the 1980s). Notwithstanding this major expansion, the firm continued to own and use its landmark 1917 building, which company president LeRoy Staver, in a 1970 Oregonian article, called "a jewel of a banking property and one that will never be duplicated".

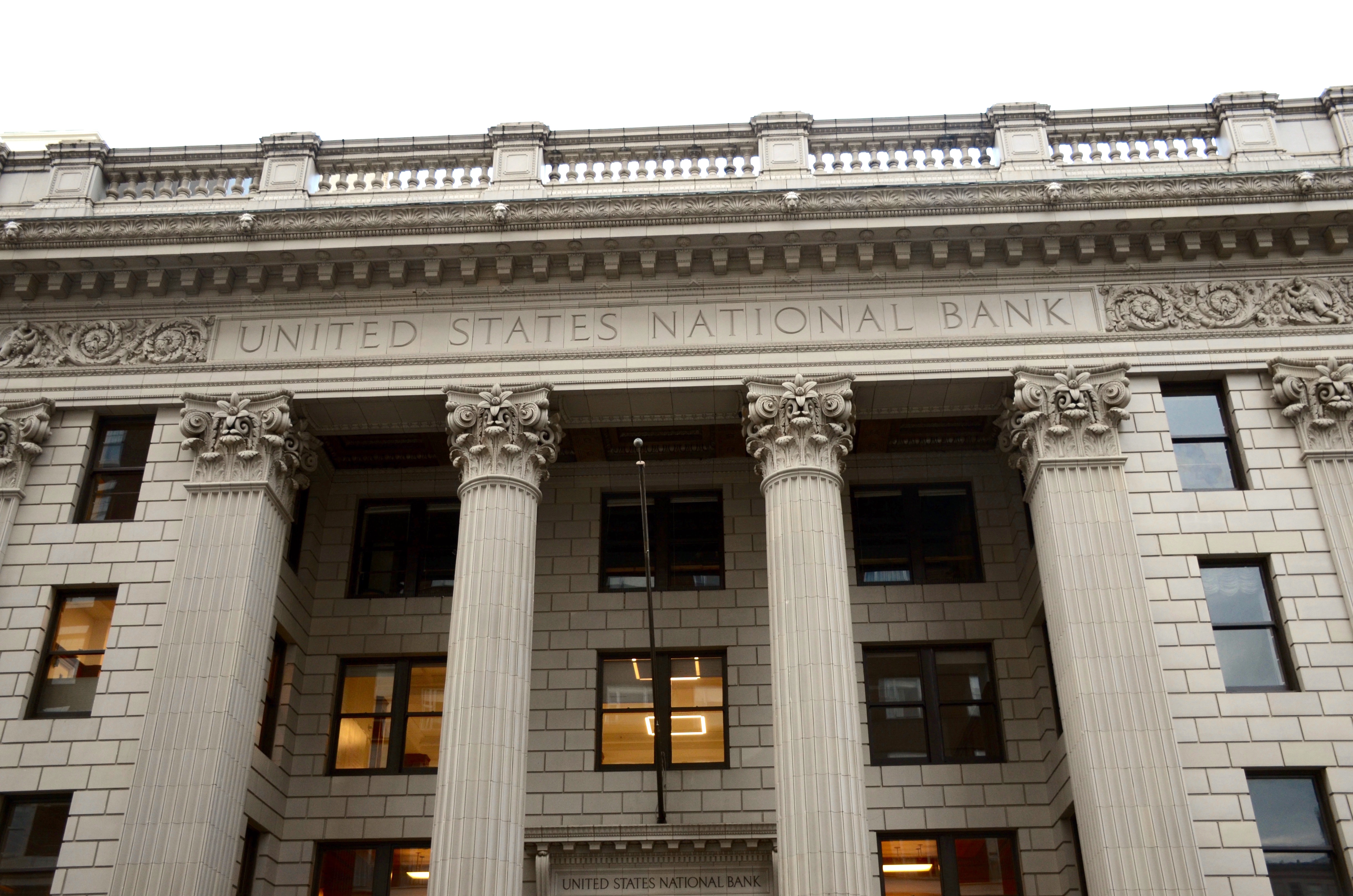
Unlike the original façade, the western façade has the bank's name inscribed on its frieze.

In a 1979 article, The Oregonian wrote that, "The 1917-vintage U.S. National Bank, 321 S.W. Sixth Avenue, retains nearly all its original features, inside and out, a rare trait among Portland landmarks." The U.S. National Bank of Oregon was honored by the Portland Historical Landmarks Commission in that year for its longstanding commitment to maintaining the building in nearly original condition.

The building was added to the National Register of Historic Places in 1986, and was still serving as the bank's main branch. Since the end of 1968, United States National Bank of Oregon has been owned by the then-newly formed holding company U.S. Bancorp, which provides consumer banking under the U.S. Bank name. One hundred years after its opening, the 1917-built, 1925-expanded original United States National Bank Building continues to serve as the main branch of U.S. Bank in Portland in 2017.

== Description ==
=== Exterior ===
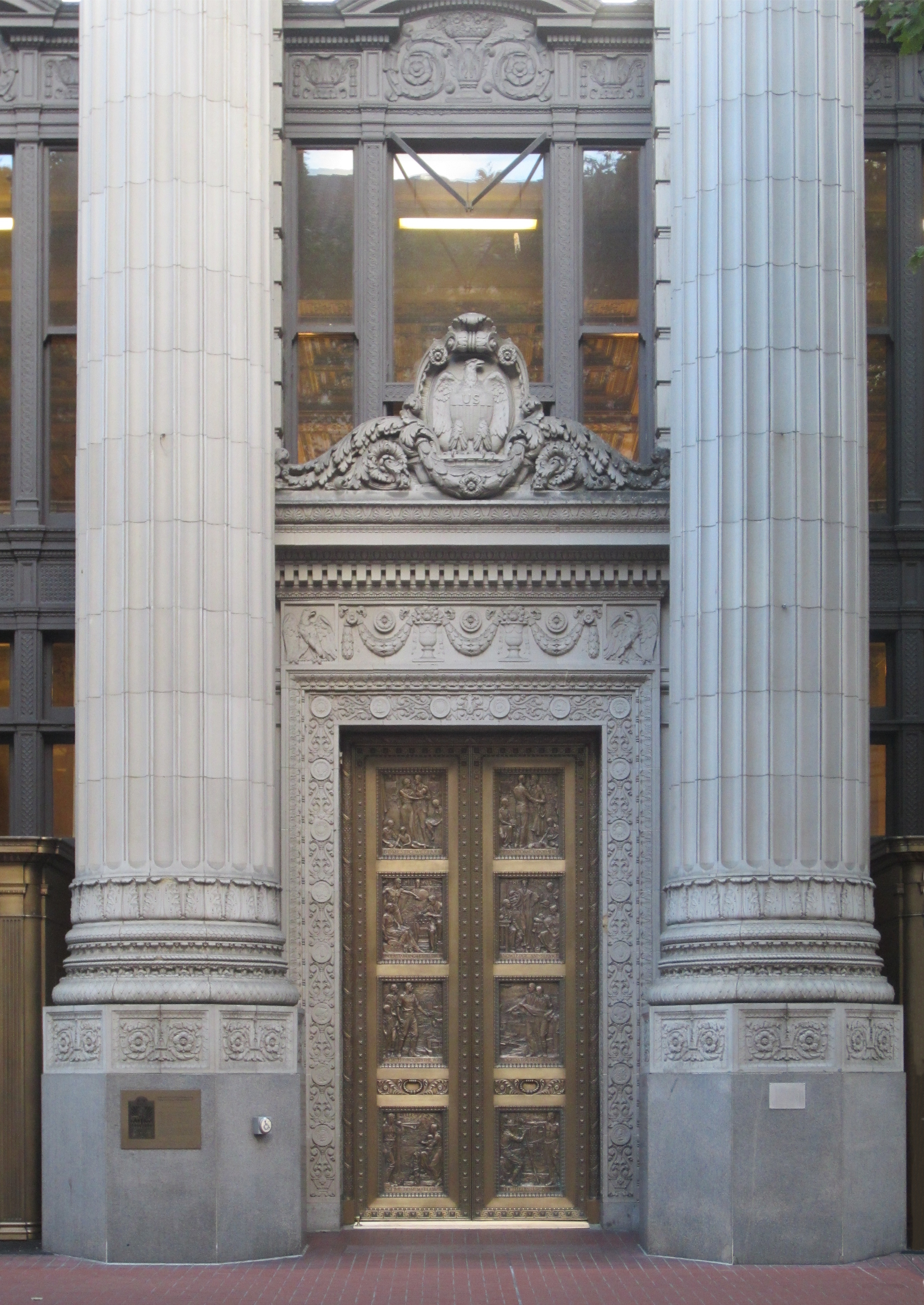
The central entrance on the eastern façade, with doors featuring bronze bas reliefs (cast in 1931)

The building is five stories tall including a mezzanine level and, after its 1925 expansion, occupies a 100-by-200-foot (30 m × 61 m) area, along the north side of SW Stark Street from Sixth Avenue to Broadway. The eastern façade, facing Sixth Avenue, features six freestanding Corinthian columns, each 54 ft (16 m) in height. These support a portico that is topped by a large and richly decorated Roman frieze, a cornice and balustrade. Decorations on the cornice include lion heads and palmettes. At the back of the portico, and behind the columns, are two Corinthian pilasters, at the far left and right ends of the façade. Between these are "five vertical bays separated by piers made of coursed, rusticated terra cotta. Window openings are set in cast-bronze frames." The five windows at the second-floor level are topped by cast-bronze segmental pediments. There are three entrance doorways in the three central bays, although originally there was only one. The central entrance features a pair of large bronze doors with highly decorated bas relief panels, surrounded by detailed terracotta, including replicas of early Greek, Roman and U.S. coins in the decoration framing the door, and a heraldic eagle in a pedimented cornice above the doorway. The bronze relief panels were cast in 1931, replacing the 1917 door panels. Designed by Avard Fairbanks, they "depict noble concepts of American life, such as 'Knowledge and Service', 'Domestic Welfare', 'Progress through Direction', and so on." Fairbanks also designed bronze relief panels for the building's western façade, built in 1925.

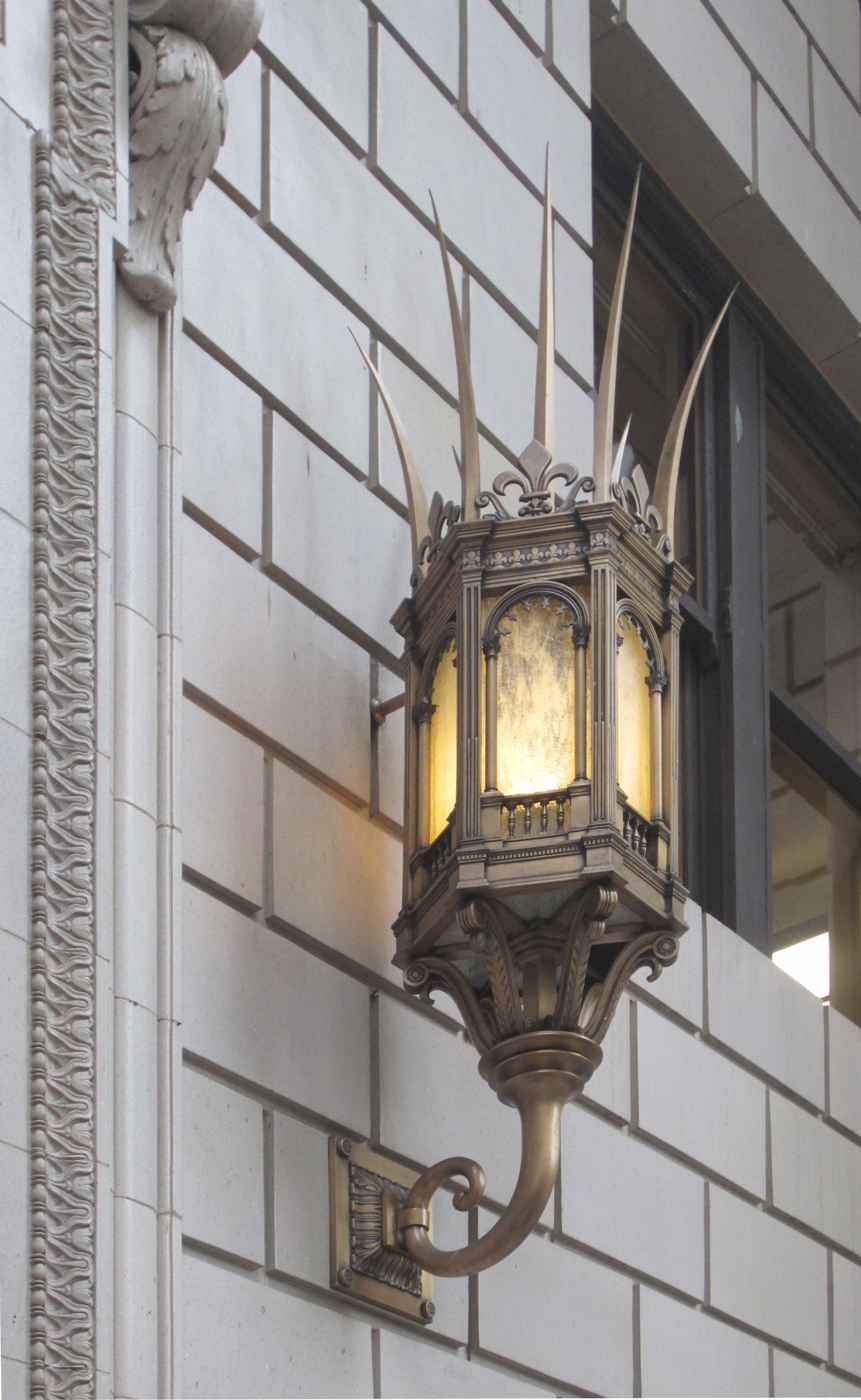
Bronze lamp on the western façade

The overall exterior design was modeled closely on a 1904 bank building, the headquarters of the Knickerbocker Trust Company, in New York City.

The southern façade, along Stark Street, is 200 ft (61 m) long and features a line of 14 Corinthian pilasters. The 12 window bays on this side have frames made of cast iron. Above the pilasters and fourth-floor windows are a cornice and balustrade with a design similar to that used at the eastern end. The Stark Street side includes one entrance, which was present from 1917, located at what was then the far back corner of the building, but its position became approximately midway along the Stark Street side following the 1925 expansion.

At the building's west end, constructed eight years later and facing Broadway, the façade is similar to the eastern one, but the main body of the building extends to the corners of the lot, and instead of a full-width portico there is a recessed portico with only two columns in the center. Six pilasters line the eastern façade, three to each side of the columns, all topped by Corinthian capitals, the same as on the building's other two exposed sides. Another difference from the eastern façade is that, on the western façade, "United States National Bank" is inscribed in the central section of the frieze, in place of the rinceau decoration there at the building's opposite end. Ornamental bronze lanterns flank the central entrance, which features bas relief panels cast in bronze in 1926–27 and designed by Avard Fairbanks. The panels at the western entrance "depict pivotal events in the historical development of the Columbia Basin".

=== Interior ===
The ground floor holds the main banking room (the Portland branch of U.S. Bank), and a grand room measuring 100 by 40 feet (30 m × 12 m) with 30-foot (9 m) ceilings. The interior is extensively decorated with highly textured materials. Square columns of polished marble topped by Corinthian capitals that incorporate an eagle motif line all four sides of the main public space. The coffered ceiling is intricately detailed. The marble floor is patterned, and the teller windows are divided by Hauteville-marble pillars detailed with bas reliefs. A recessed mezzanine floor runs along the north and south sides, behind the columns. The bank vaults are in the basement, where the public space also has a marble floor.

The third and fourth floors are office space, centered around a courtyard. A remodeling of the fourth-floor offices in 1948, based on designs by Pietro Belluschi, incorporated Oregon myrtle in the paneling and custom furnishings. The bank's board room, located on the third floor, includes a marble fireplace and stained glass windows by the noted Portland company, Povey Brothers Studio. The room is located in the southwest quadrant of the floor, in the 1925-built section, and is 55 ft × 30 ft (16.8 m × 9.1 m) in size. Its walls are covered in dark walnut. Ornamental lighting fixtures with brass wall mountings adorn the east and west ends of the room, and a bronze ring chandelier hangs above the center.

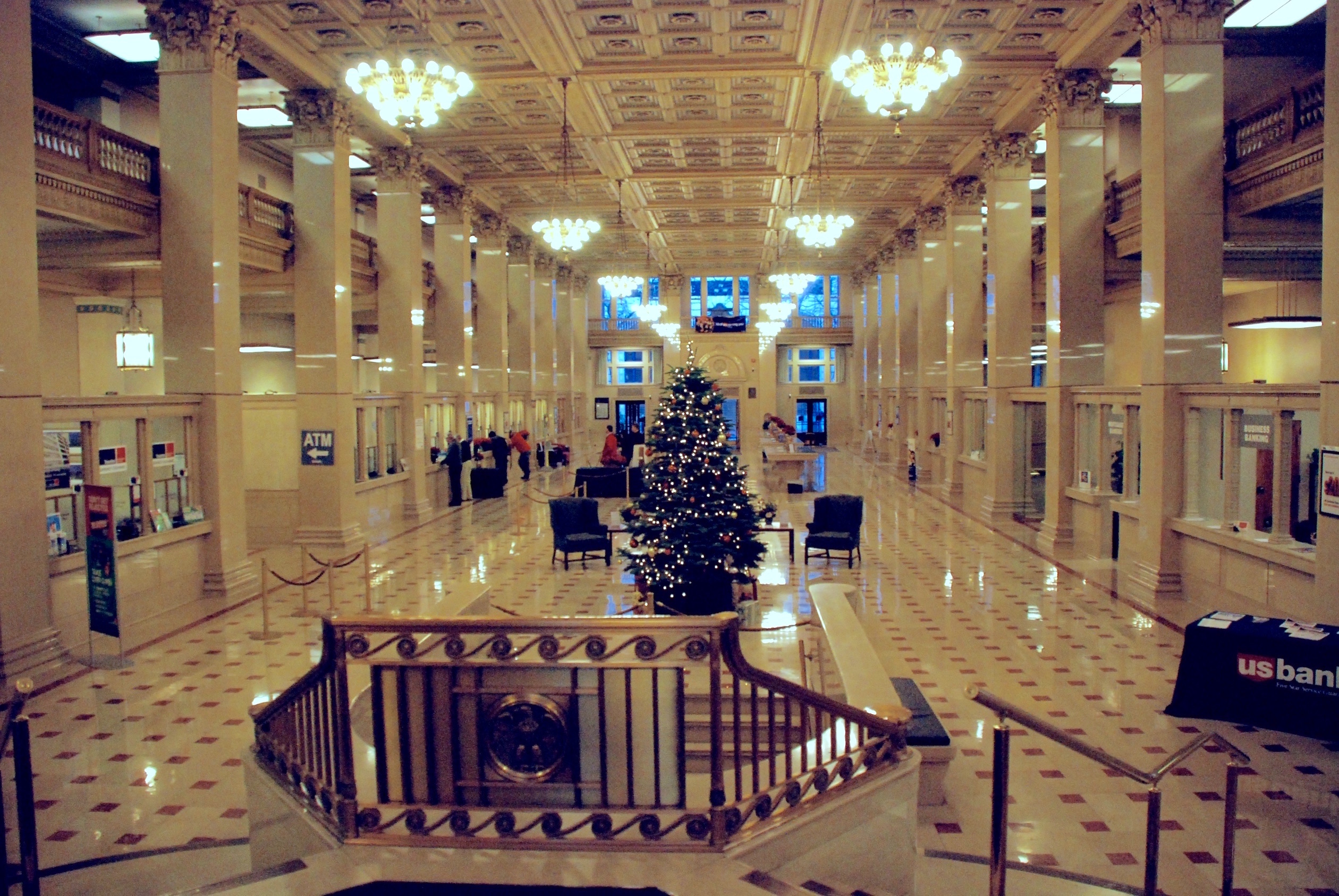
The main banking room, viewed from the west end (1925 section) looking toward the east end (1917 section)

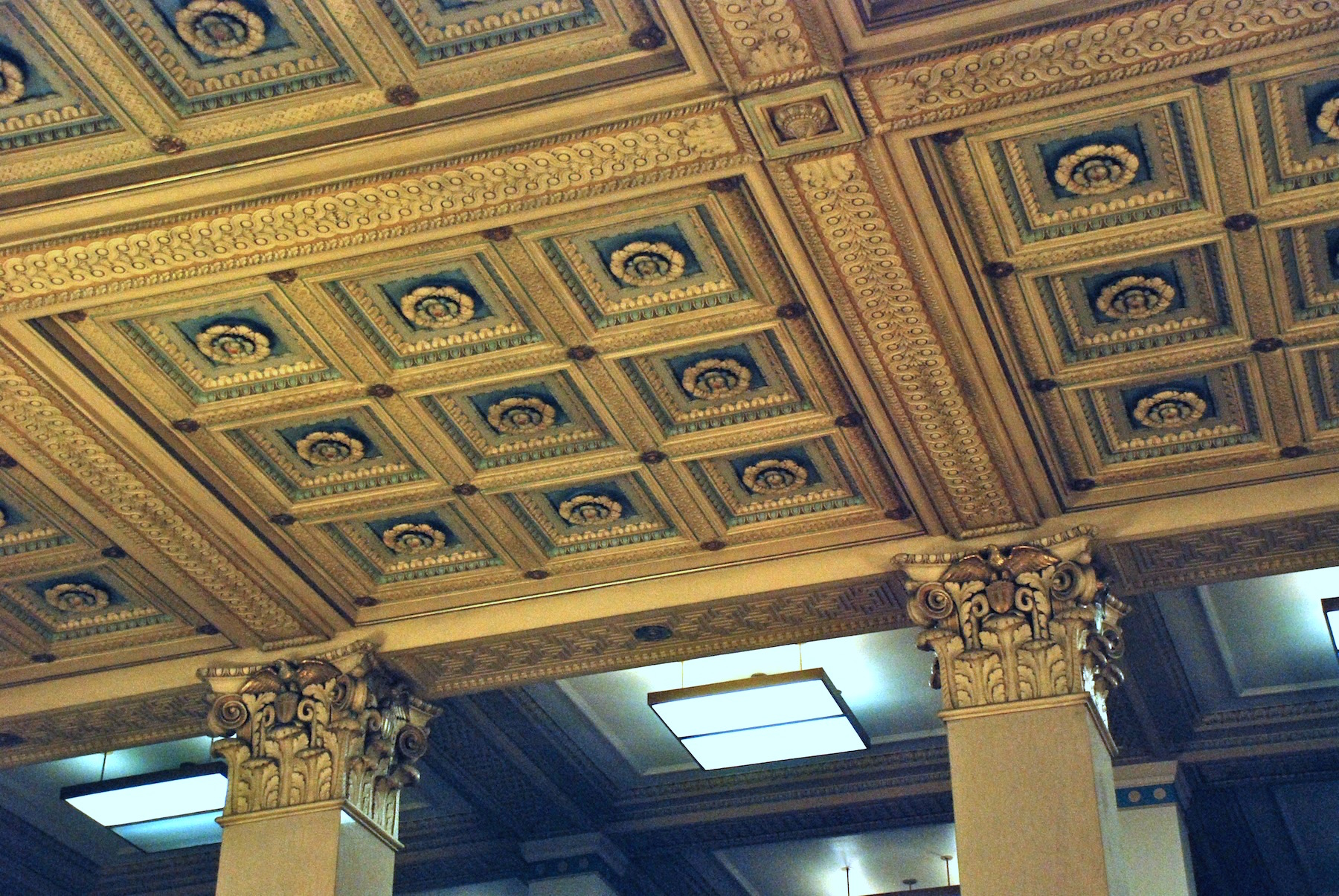
Elaborate ceiling panels and eagle-motif capitals in the ground-floor main banking room

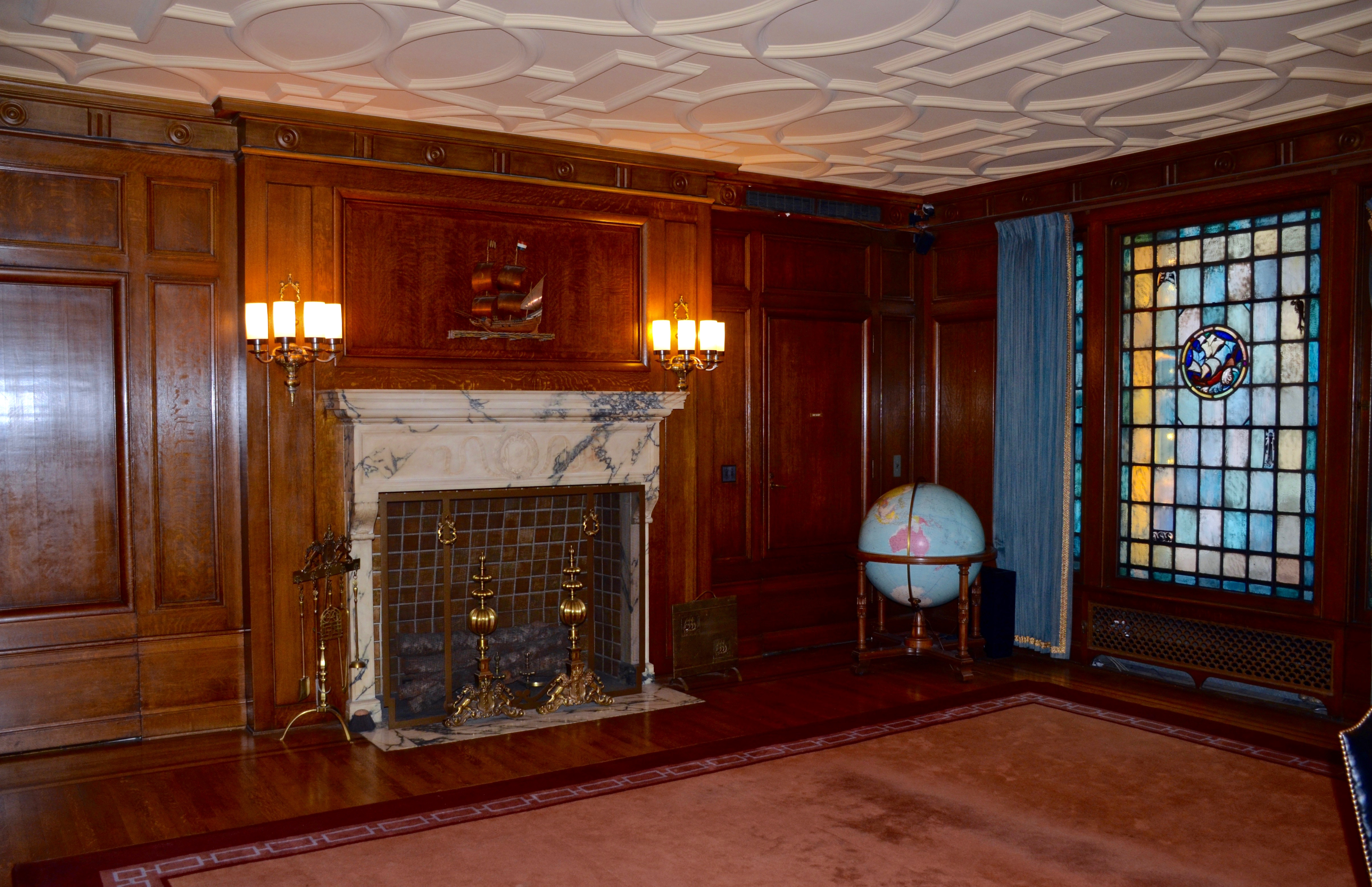
Corner of the boardroom, with fireplace and one of three large stained-glass windows

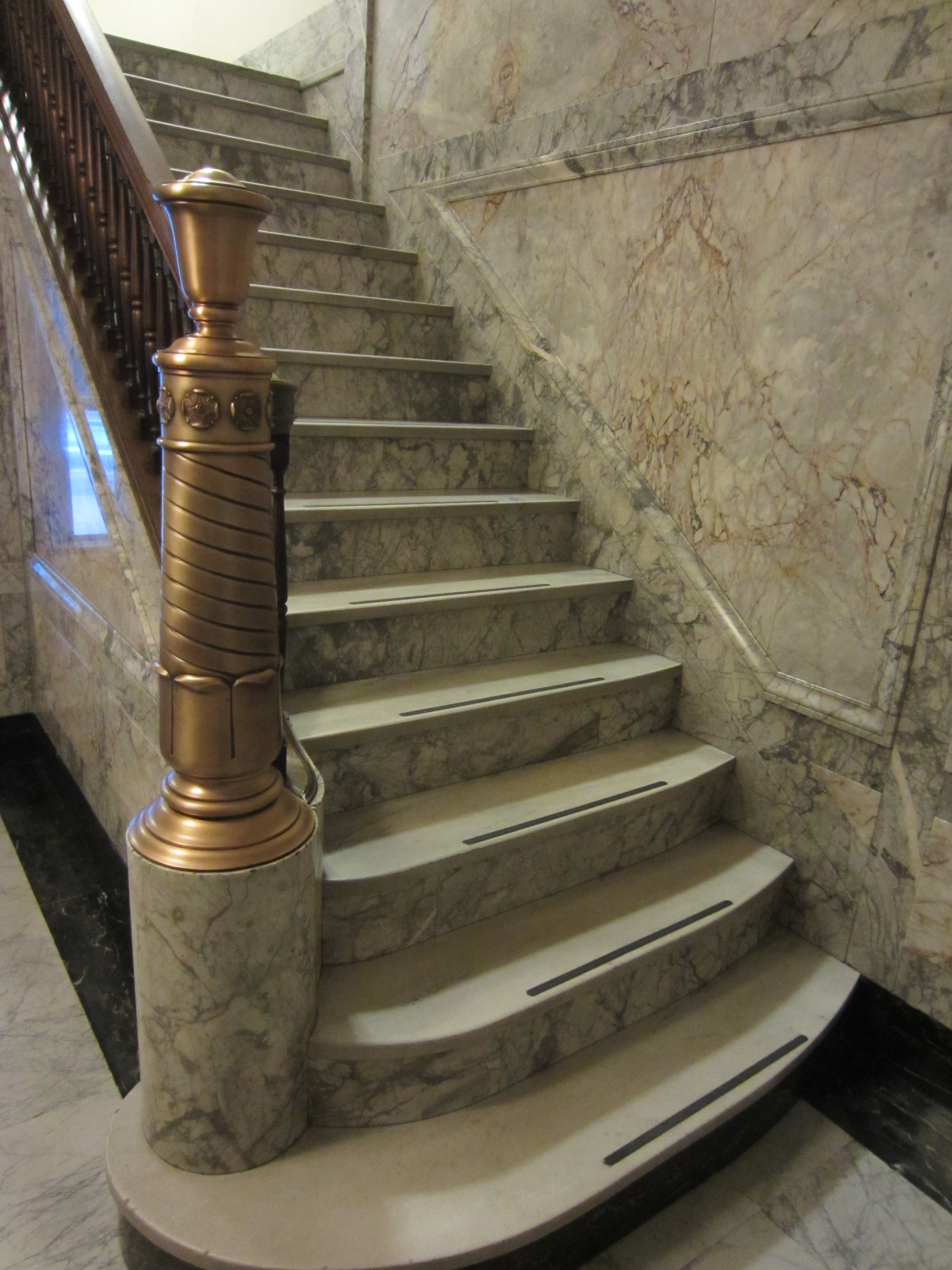
Marble stairway with bronze ornamentation

== Immediate surroundings ==
At its east end, the United States National Bank Building stands directly across 6th Avenue from another A. E. Doyle-designed bank building, the Bank of California Building, of 1925. The aforementioned building's Italianate style contrasts sharply with the U.S. National Bank Building's classical design. The northbound Portland Transit Mall passes in front of the building's east end, and during the mall's construction in 1976–77 the plain concrete sidewalk there was resurfaced in brick, and street trees were added. MAX light rail trains have passed in front of the building's east end on 6th Avenue since 2009, following a 2007–08 rebuilding of the transit mall.

== See also ==
- Architecture of Portland, Oregon
- National Register of Historic Places listings in Southwest Portland, Oregon
