= Wells Fargo Building (Portland, Oregon) =

Historic bank building in Portland, Oregon, U.S.

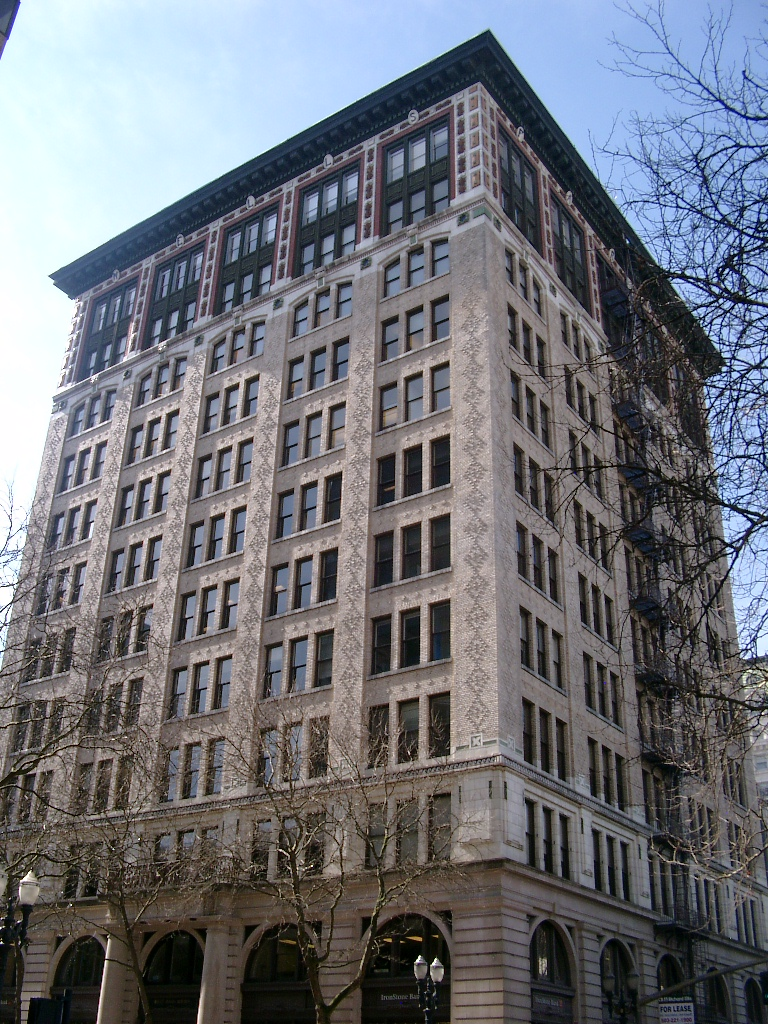

- Location within Portland, Oregon
- Alternative names: Porter Building; US National Bank Building

General information
- Type: Commercial offices
- Location: 309 SW 6th Avenue; Portland, Oregon
- Coordinates: 45.521620°N 122.677575°W
- Construction started: 1905
- Completed: 1907

Height
- Roof: 56.4 m (185 ft)

Technical details
- Floor count: 12
- Floor area: 20,903 sq ft (1,942.0 m^{2})

Design and construction
- Architect: Benjamin Wistar Morris III
- Wells Fargo Building
- U.S. National Register of Historic Places
- Portland Historic Landmark
- Architectural style: Neo-Renaissance
- NRHP reference No.: 86002839
- Added to NRHP: October 9, 1986

The Wells Fargo Building is a historic office building in downtown Portland, Oregon, United States. The large doorstep at the building's entryway required the largest slab of granite ever shipped to Portland at the time. Completed in 1907, the steel-framed building is considered the city's first true skyscraper. At 12 stories and with a height of 182 feet (55 m), it was the tallest building in Portland exclusive of towers, and remained so until the completion of Yeon Building in 1911, which took the title of the tallest office building in Oregon that year. The clock tower of the 1892-completed Oregonian Building, which measured 194 feet (59 m) in height, made that building the tallest in the city overall.

In 1946, the building was purchased by the United States National Bank of Portland, whose headquarters was located in a smaller building located directly adjacent, immediately to the south. U.S. National Bank used the Wells Fargo Building to expand its downtown Portland headquarters.

In 1986, the building was placed on the National Register of Historic Places.

== See also ==
- Architecture of Portland, Oregon
- National Register of Historic Places listings in Southwest Portland, Oregon
