= Architecture of Portland, Oregon =

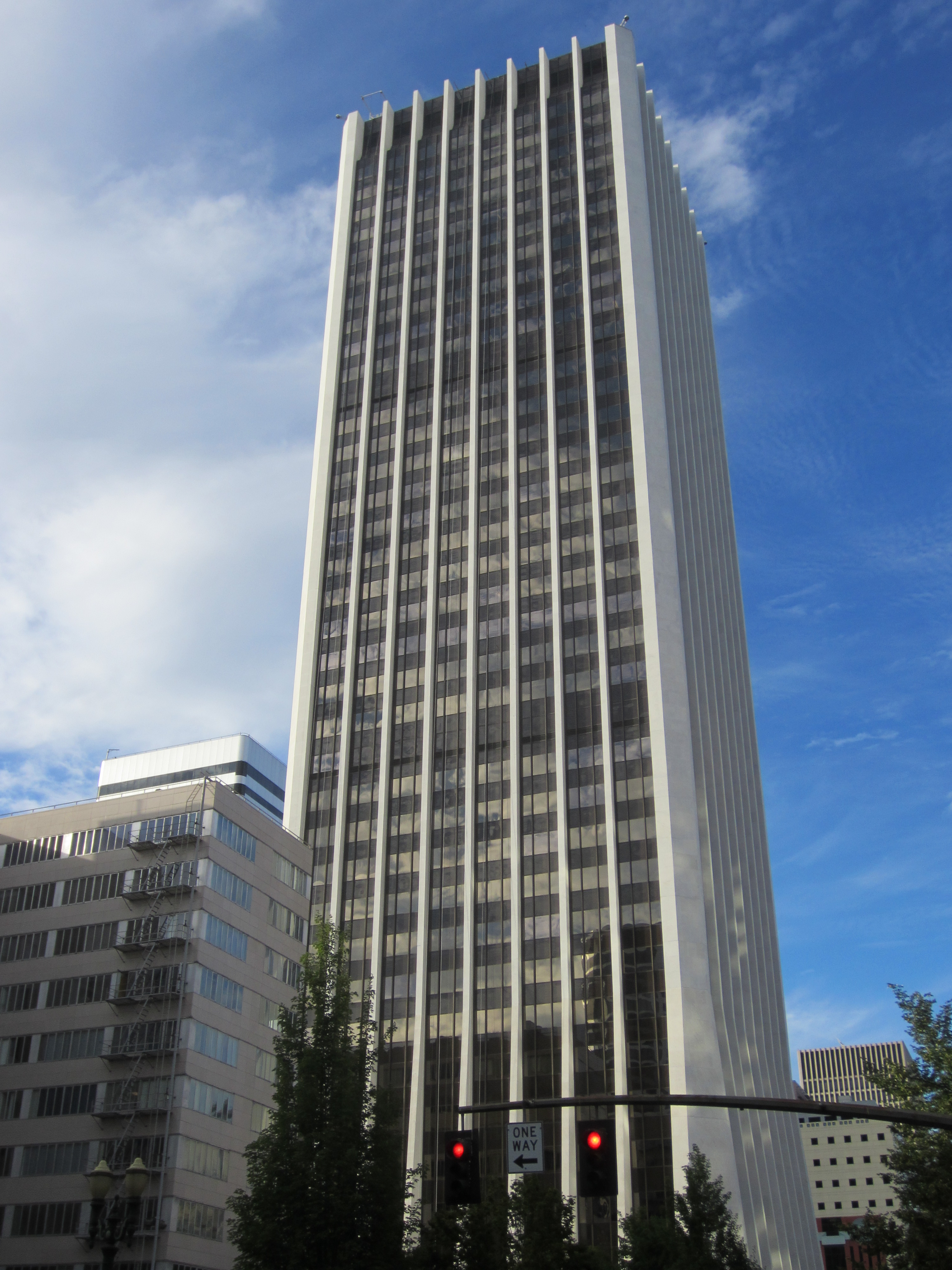
The Wells Fargo Center is the tallest building in Portland.

Portland architecture includes a number of notable buildings, a wide range of styles, and a few notable pioneering architects.

The scale of many projects is relatively small, as a result of the relatively small size of downtown-Portland blocks (200 feet by 200 feet) and strict height restrictions enacted to protect views of nearby Mount Hood from Portland's West Hills. Although these restrictions limit project size, they contribute to Portland's reputation for thoughtful urban planning and livability.

Many older buildings have been preserved and re-used, including many glazed terra-cotta buildings.

Portland is a leader in sustainable architecture and is known for its focus on urban planning. As of 2009, Portland had the second highest number of LEED-accredited "green" buildings of any city in the U.S., second only to Chicago.

== Architects ==
Well-known architect Pietro Belluschi began his career in Portland with the prolific firm of A.E. Doyle, leaving his imprint upon the city until the 1980s. Other notable architects and firms who have worked in Portland are Skidmore, Owings and Merrill (SOM), Michael Graves, Cass Gilbert, Rapp and Rapp, Daniel Burnham & Co., Kohn Pedersen Fox (KPF), Frank Lloyd Wright, Richard Neutra, Zimmer Gunsul Frasca Architects (ZGF) and Brad Cloepfil of Allied Works. Local architects that have had a large influence on Portland's architecture include Francis Marion Stokes and his father William R. Stokes (combined works include over 270 buildings from 1882 to the 1960s), the Victorian-era architect Warren H. Williams (architect of several surviving cast-iron buildings including the Blagen Block as well as the stick-gothic Old Church) and Whidden & Lewis (architects of Portland City Hall, the long demolished Portland Hotel, the Weinhard Brewery Complex, the Failing Office Building, several office buildings on SW 3rd Ave. and numerous residences).

== Skyscrapers ==
Portland building concentrations

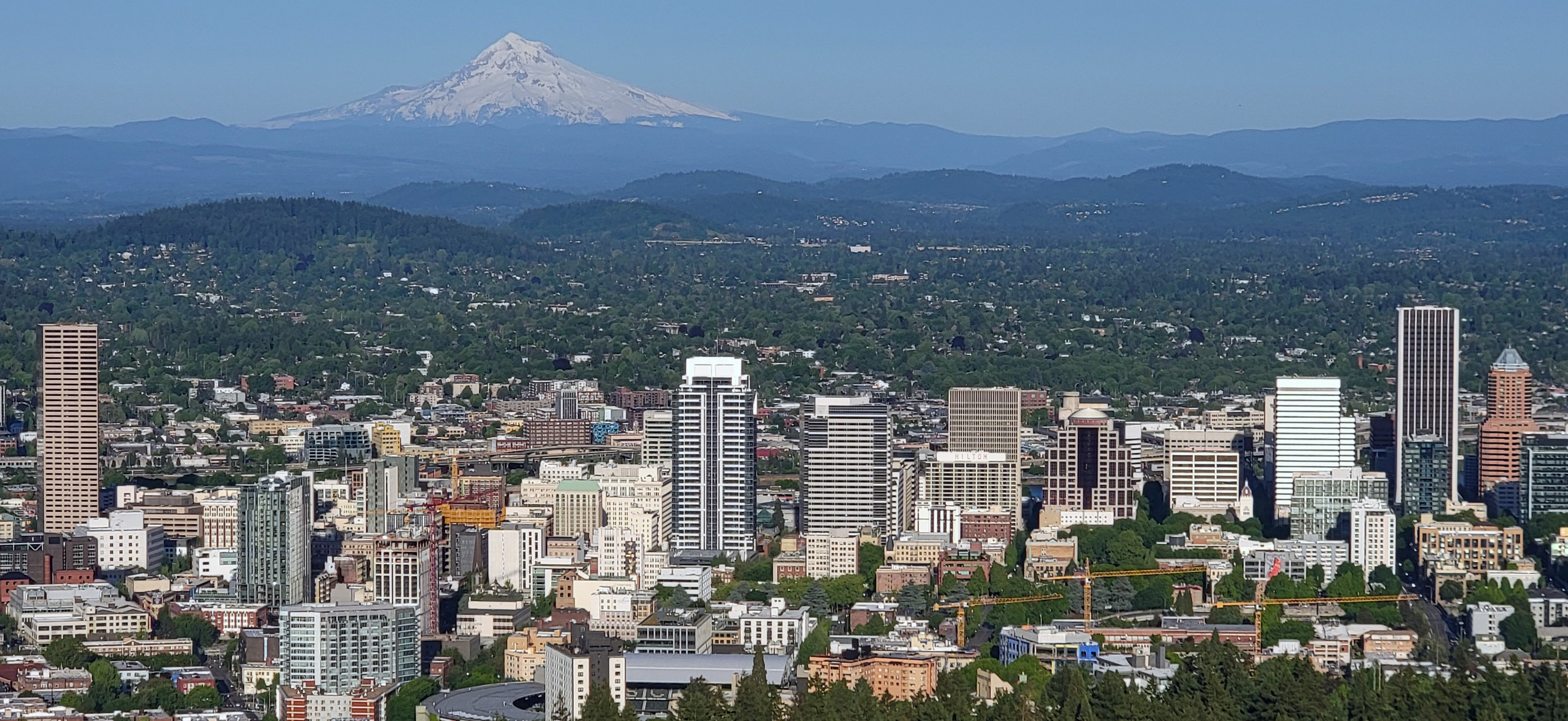
Downtown

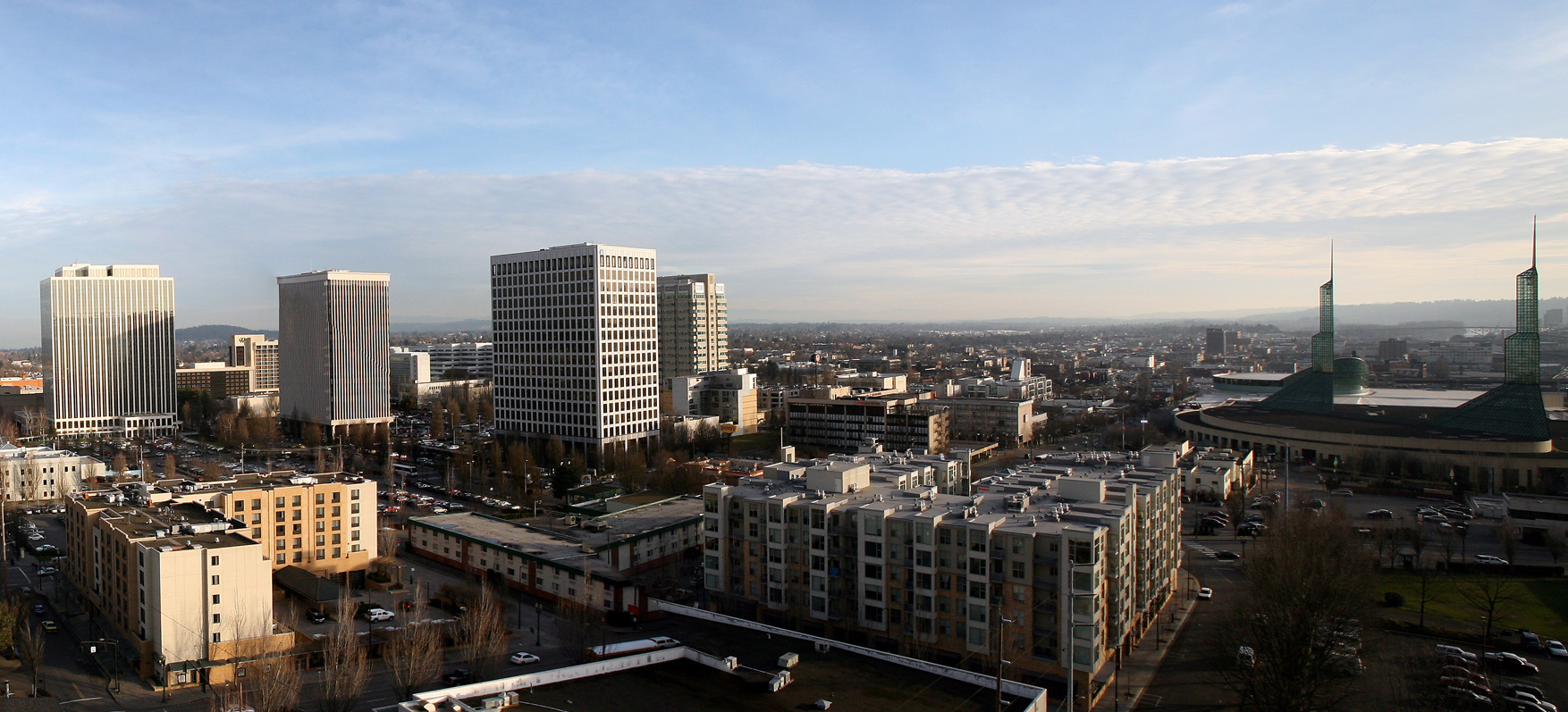
Lloyd District

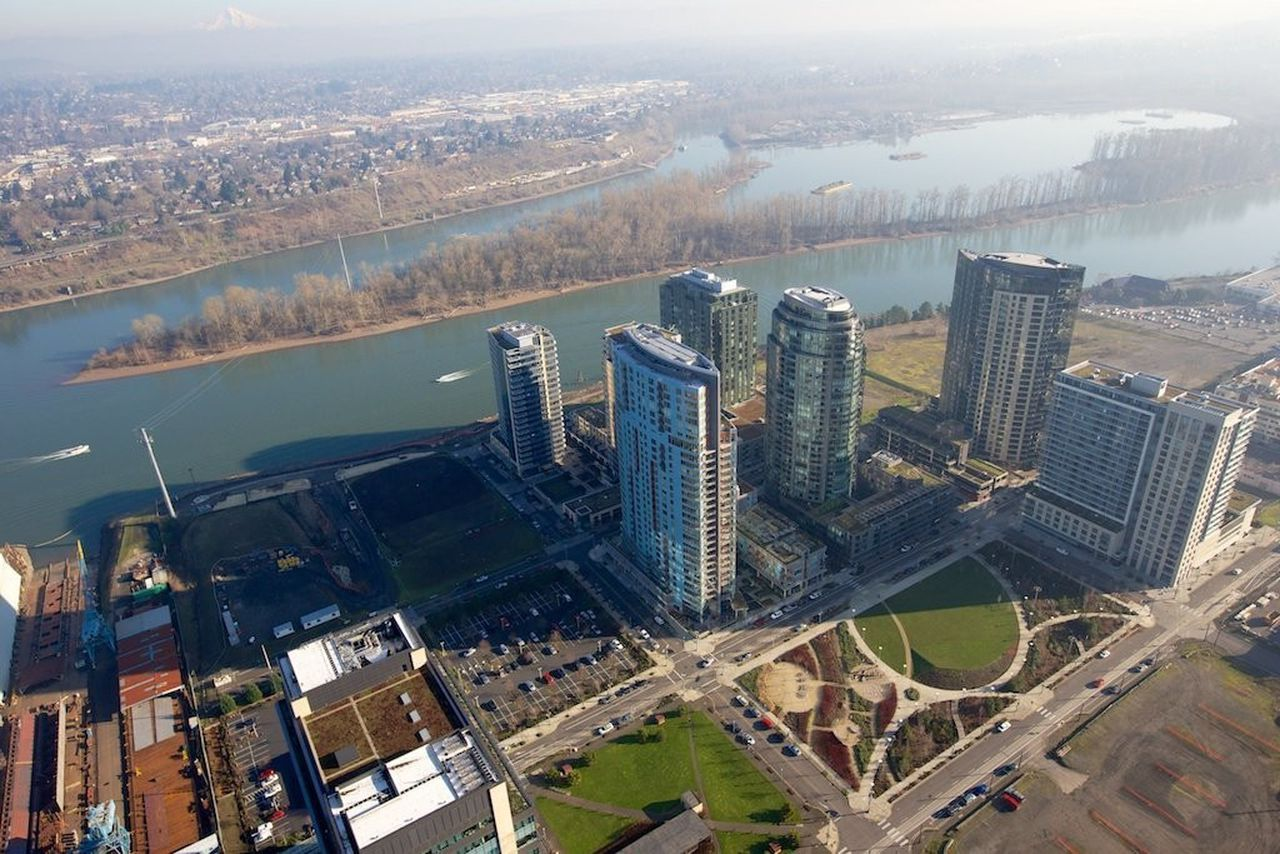
South Waterfront

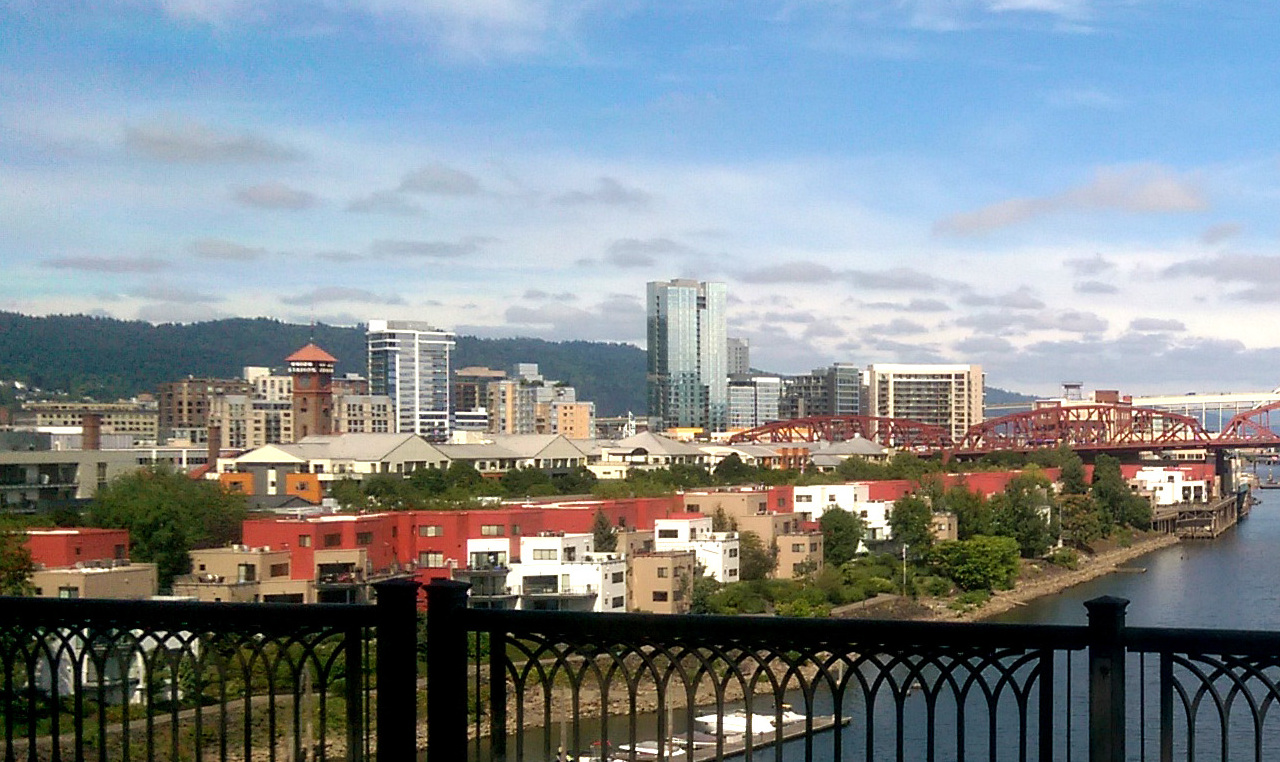
Pearl District

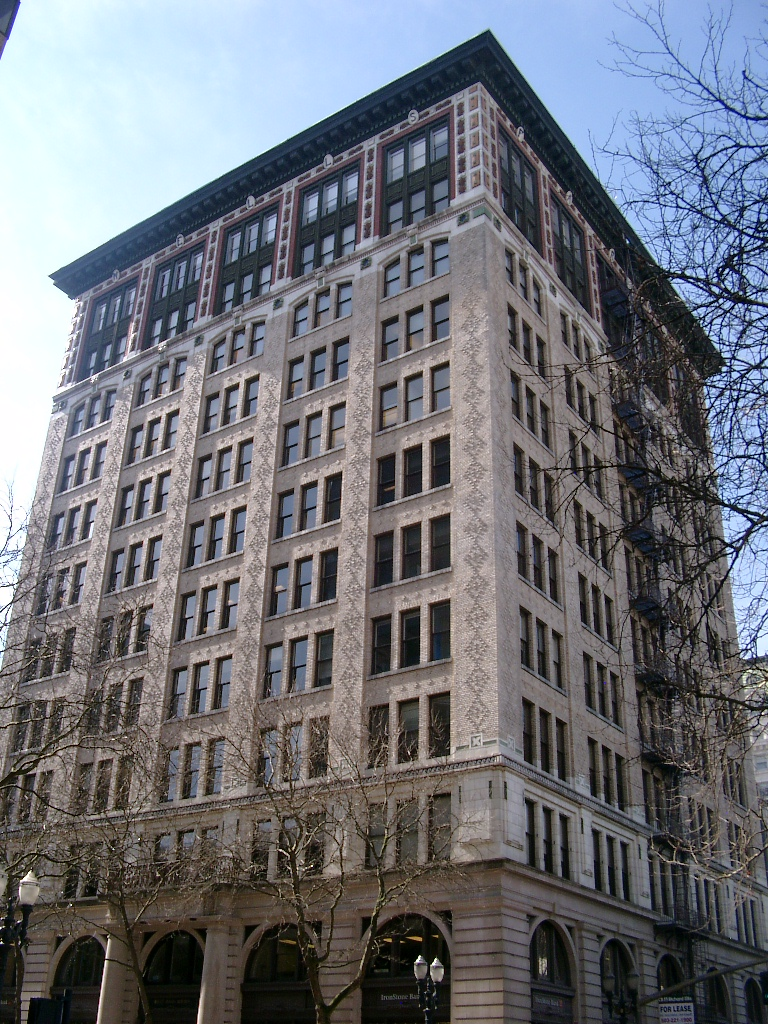
The Wells Fargo Building is considered the first skyscraper in Portland.

Portland has four main concentrations of high-rise buildings: Downtown, the Lloyd District, South Waterfront, and the Pearl District. Downtown high-rises have a wide range of building types including office, residential, lodging, municipal, and retail. Lloyd District high-rises have historically been primarily office, although smaller residential and lodging buildings have been added in recent years. South Waterfront and the Pearl District are almost entirely residential. Additionally, Lloyd District has been home to a federal building, and Portland's Oregon state office building (and the adjacent Oregon Square), since 1959 and 1992, respectively.

=== Early 20th century ===
The first "true skyscraper" in Portland was the Wells Fargo Building, completed in 1907. It is a 182 feet (55 m) steel-framed building, although the tallest building from 1892 to 1911 was the Oregonian Building, if its clocktower is included. The large doorstep at the building's entryway required the largest slab of granite ever shipped to Portland at the time.

In 1911, the Yeon Building was completed, which was the tallest building in the city for two years. The building was clad in glazed terra-cotta, and culminates in a colonnade on the top floors. For a time, the building was illuminated by light sockets built into the cornices, but they were later removed. In 1913, the Yeon building was surpassed in height by the American Bank Building, which remained the tallest, at 207 feet (63 m), for 14 years.

Many buildings in Portland from this period employed the Chicago school and commercial style of architecture. Beaux-arts and Neoclassical architecture were also common.

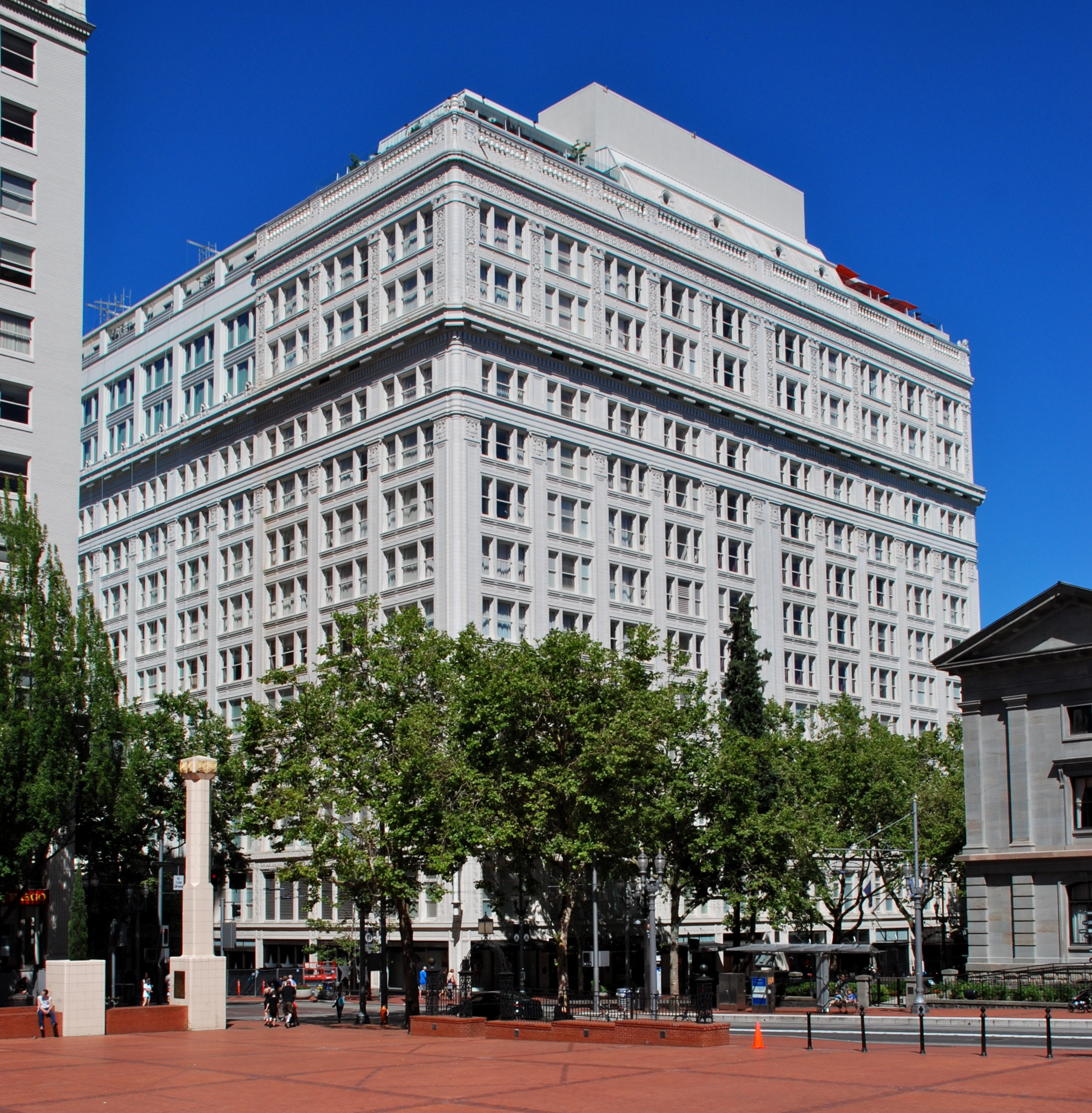
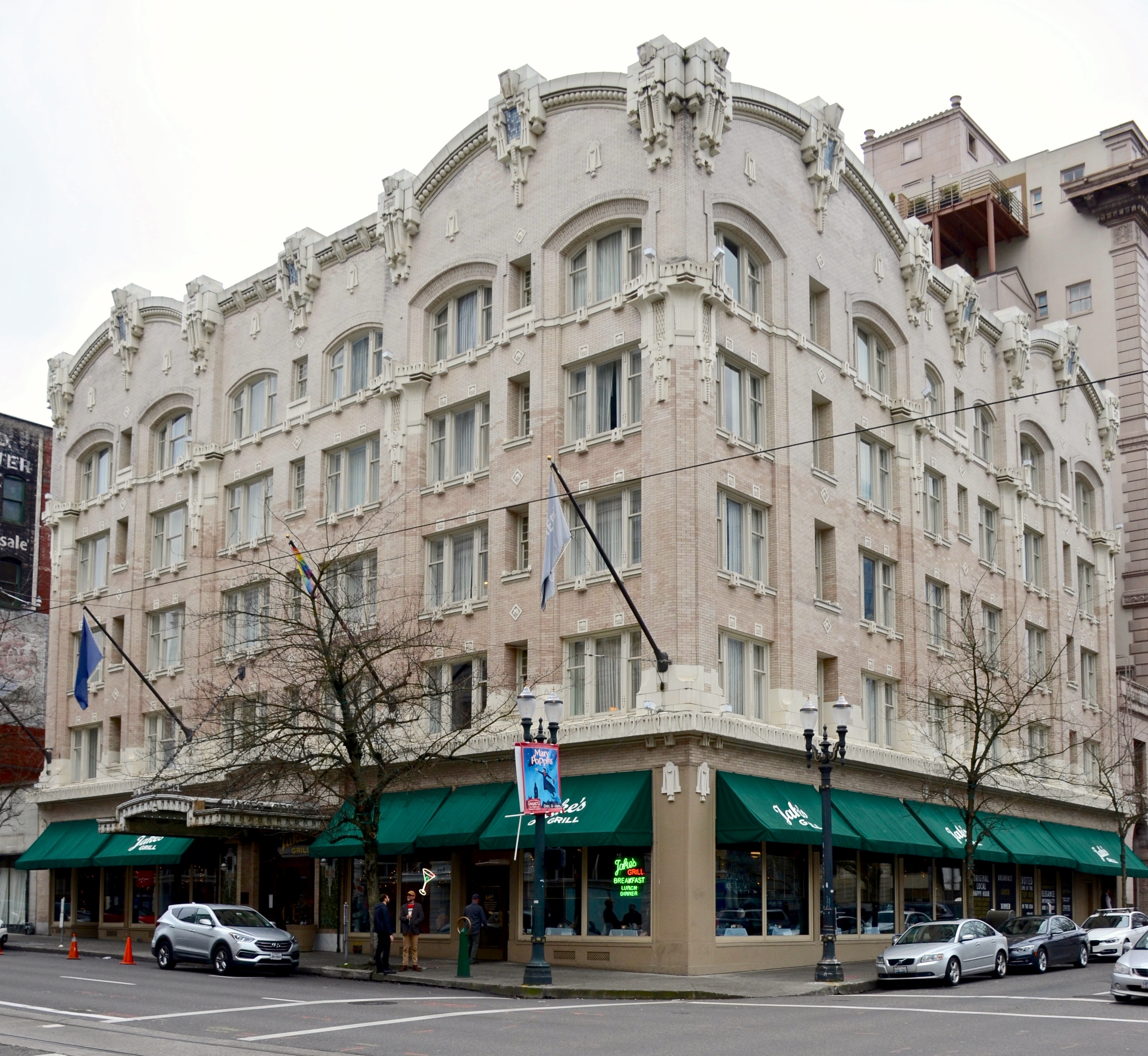
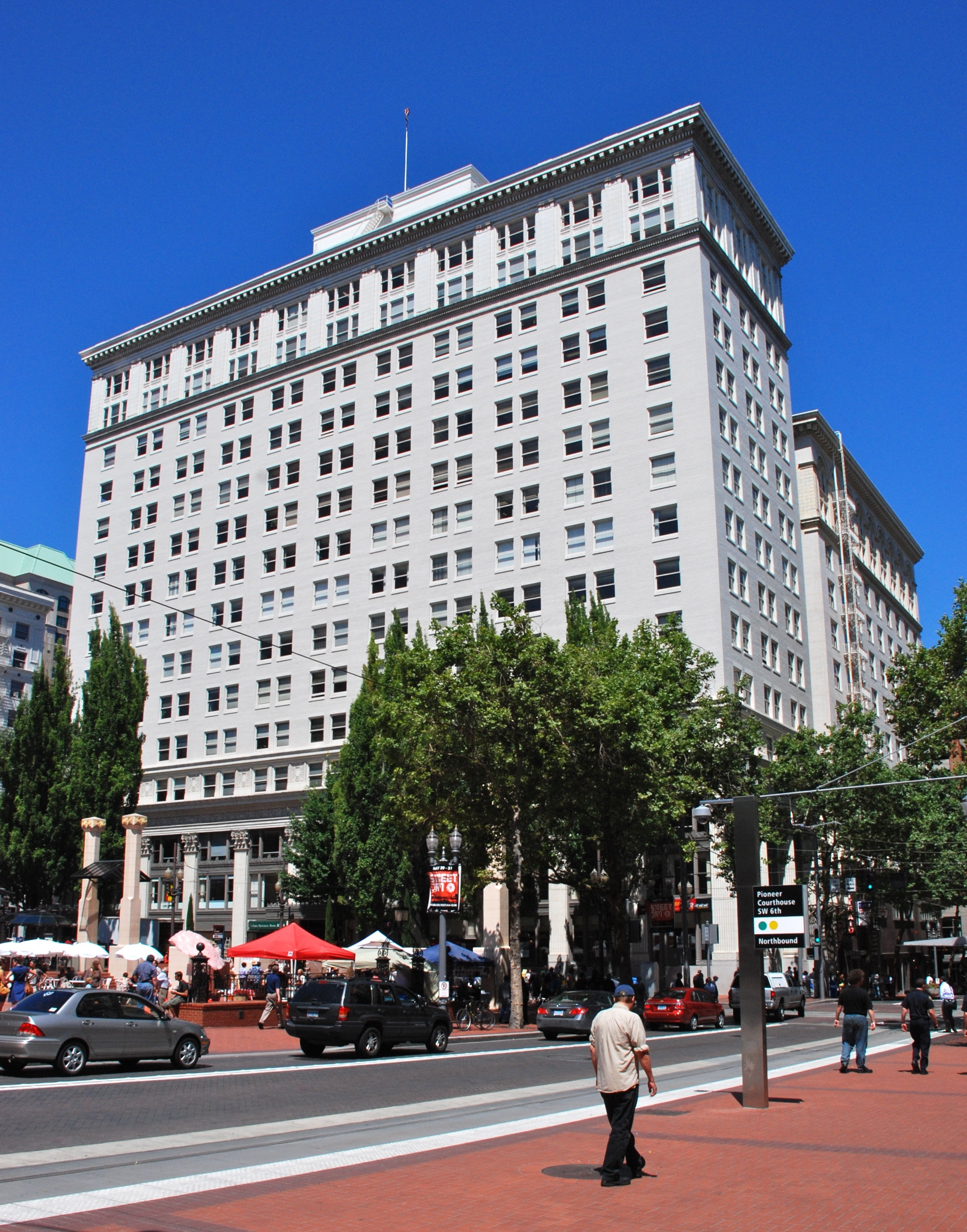
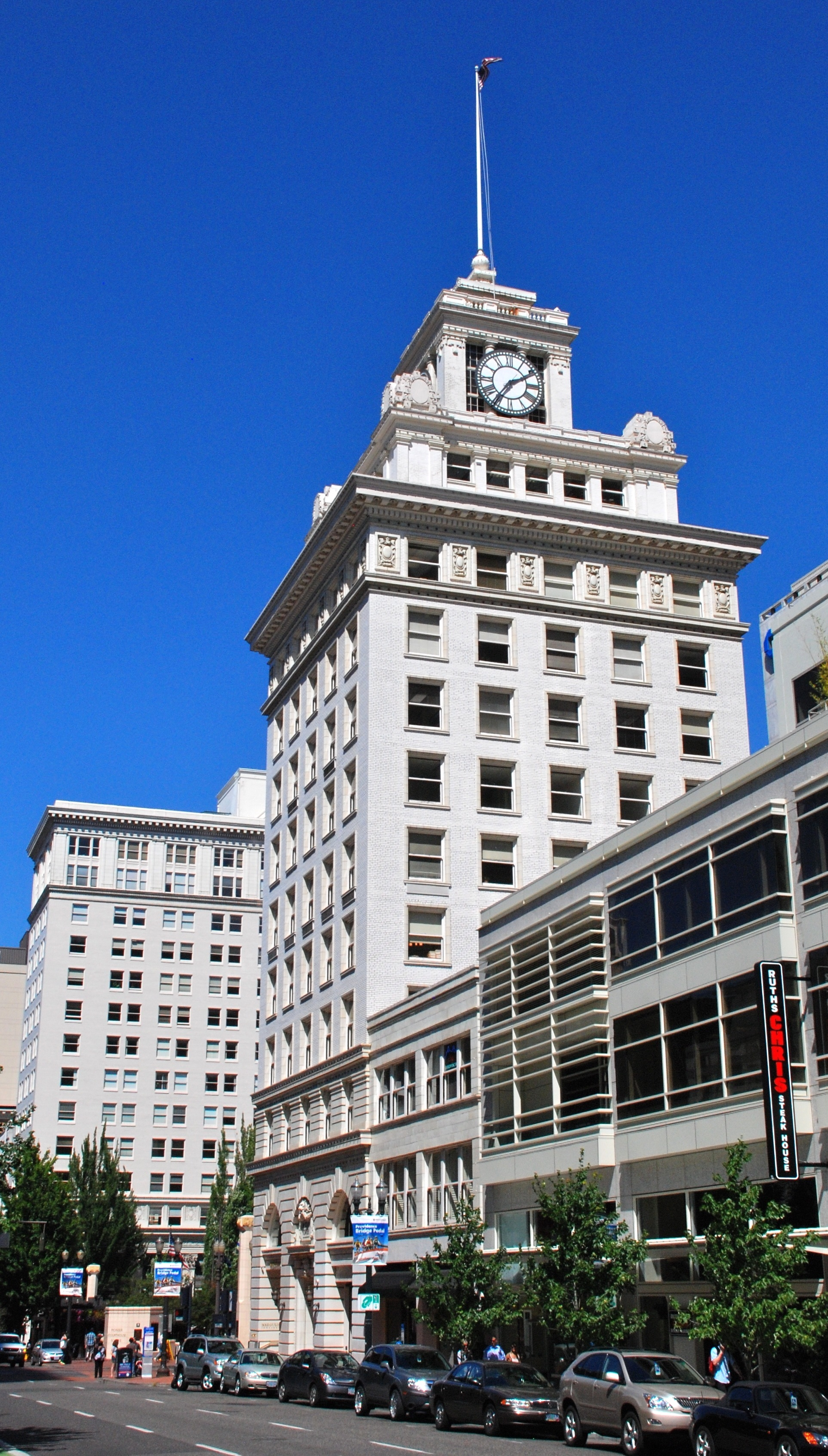
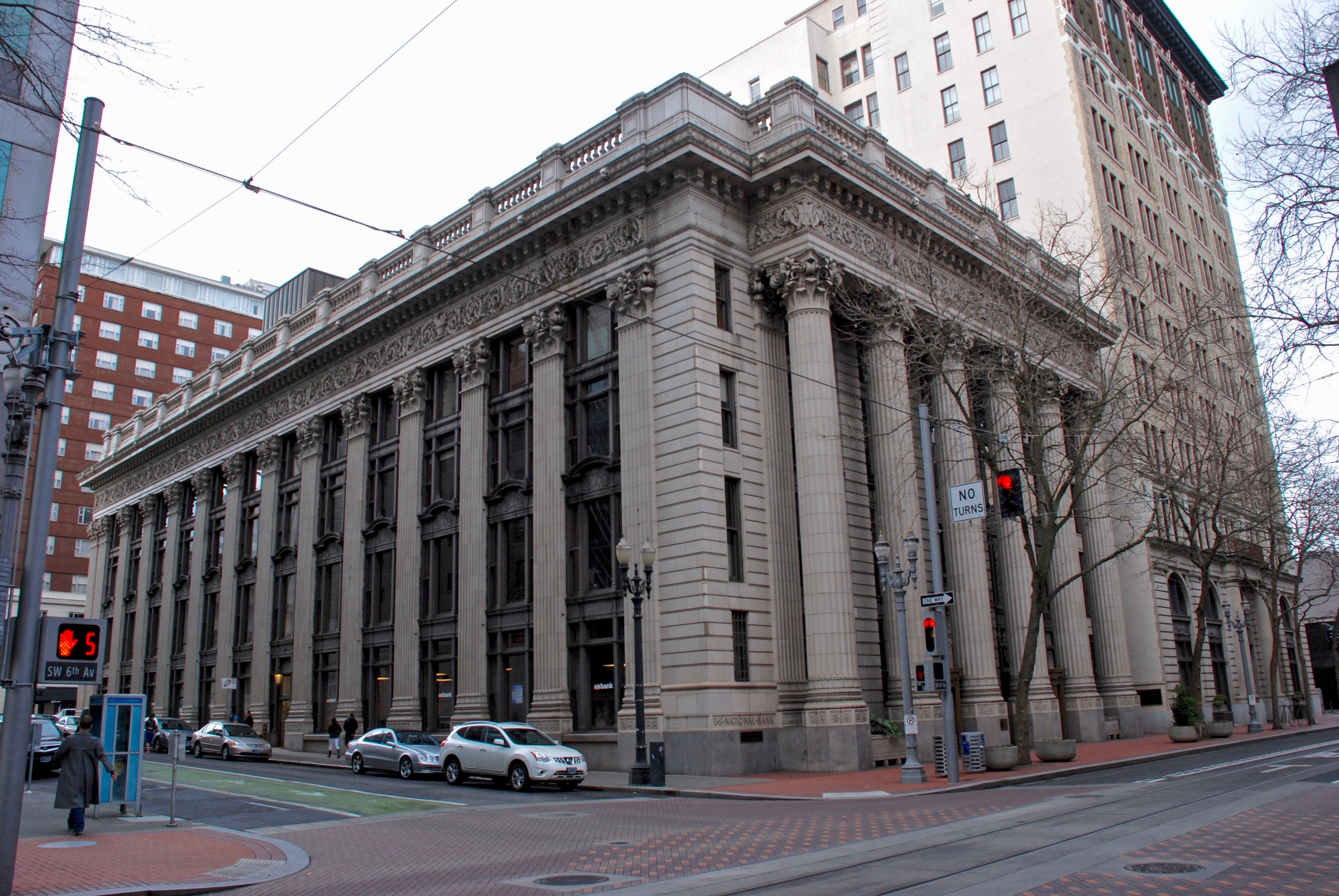
Meier & Frank Building (1909), Seward Hotel (1909), American Bank Building (1913), Oregon Journal Building (1912), United States National Bank Building (1917)

=== Late 20th century ===
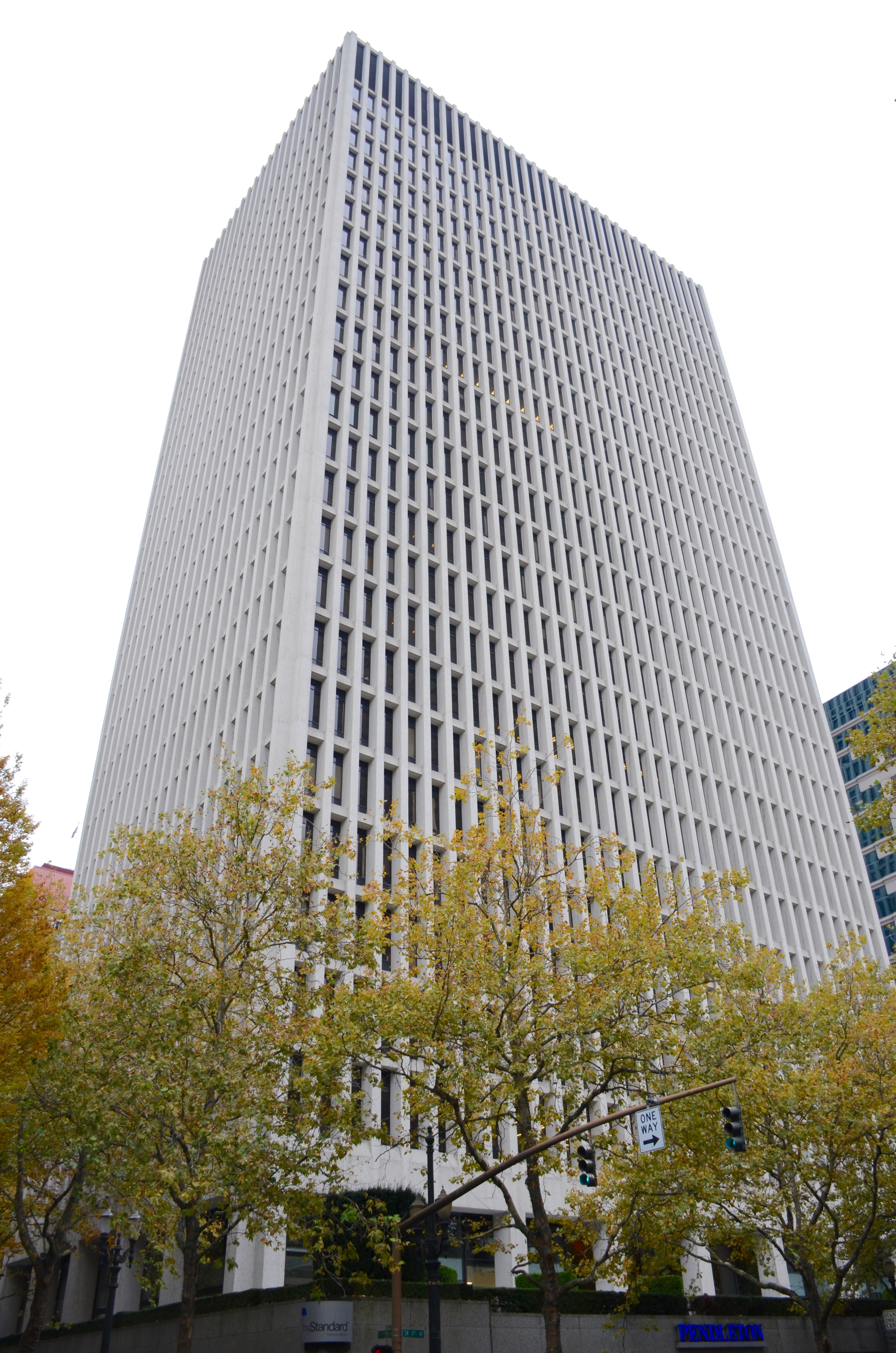
Standard Insurance Center (1970)

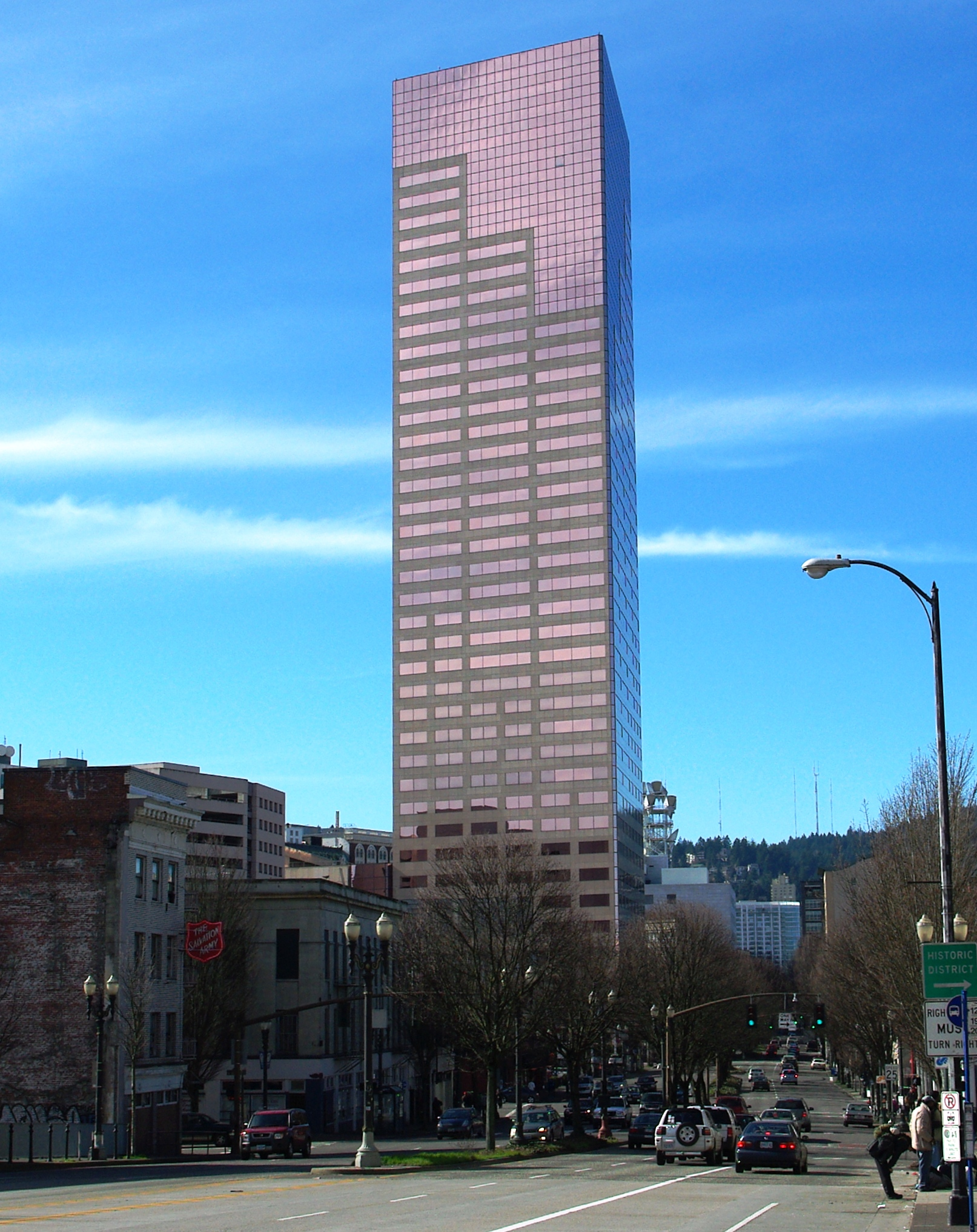
U.S. Bancorp Tower (1983)

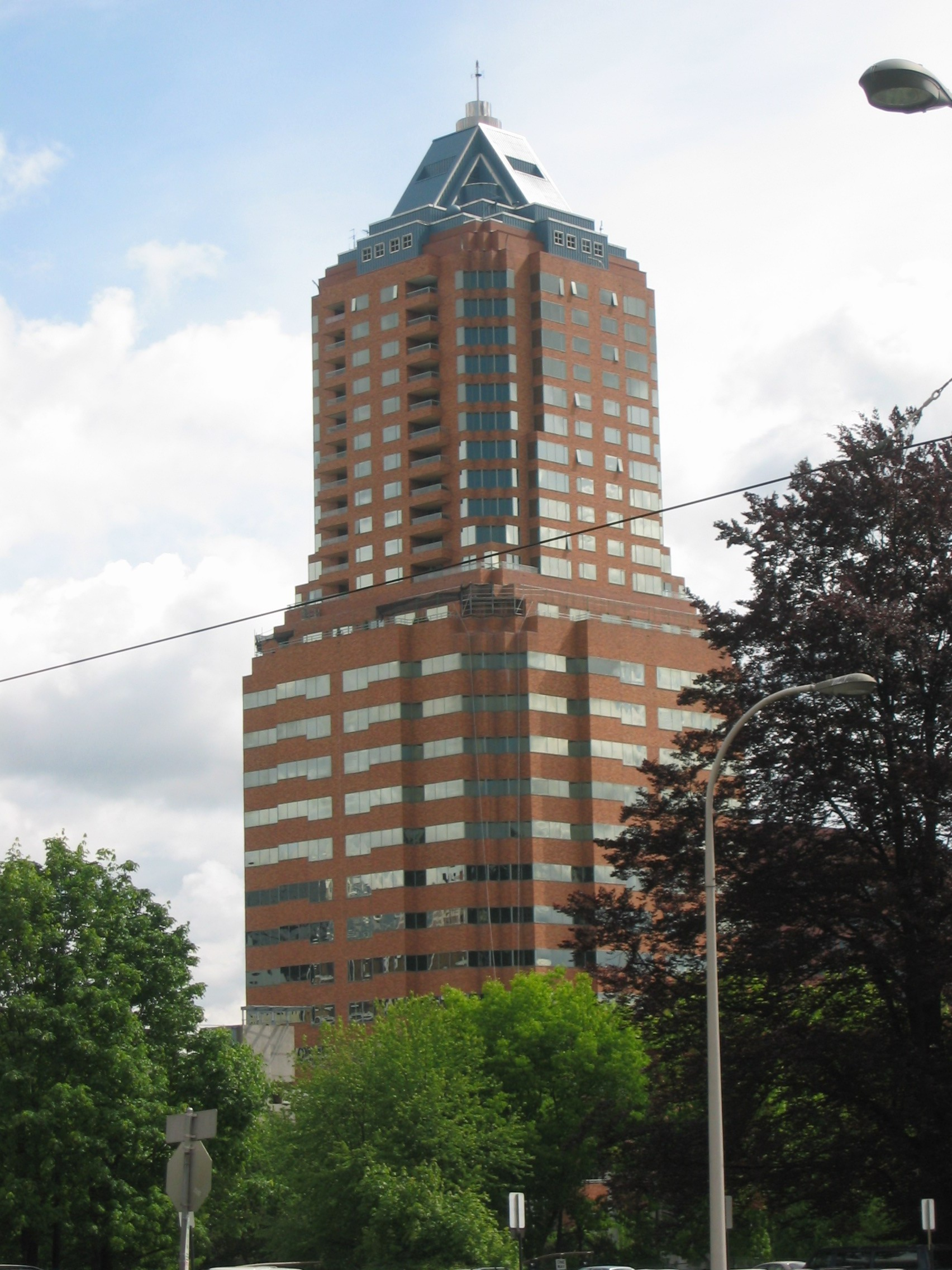
KOIN Tower (1984)

The late 20th century saw a massive increase of modern skyscrapers. International style and modernist architecture dominated most of the buildings in this time period. Beginning in 1962, multiple buildings were completed, seemingly competing for tallest building. In Portland's timeline of tallest buildings, half of them were built in the 1960s and 1970s. The Hilton Portland Hotel was the tallest from 1962 to 1965. A carpenters strike halted the project temporarily during construction. The West Tower of the Harrison Tower Apartments, a modernist building reminiscent of New York City housing projects, was tallest from 1965 to 1969. The Union Bank Tower, followed by the Standard Insurance Center, both International style office buildings, were tallest for less than one year and two years, respectively.

In 1972, the Wells Fargo Center was completed, and has been the tallest building in the city since.

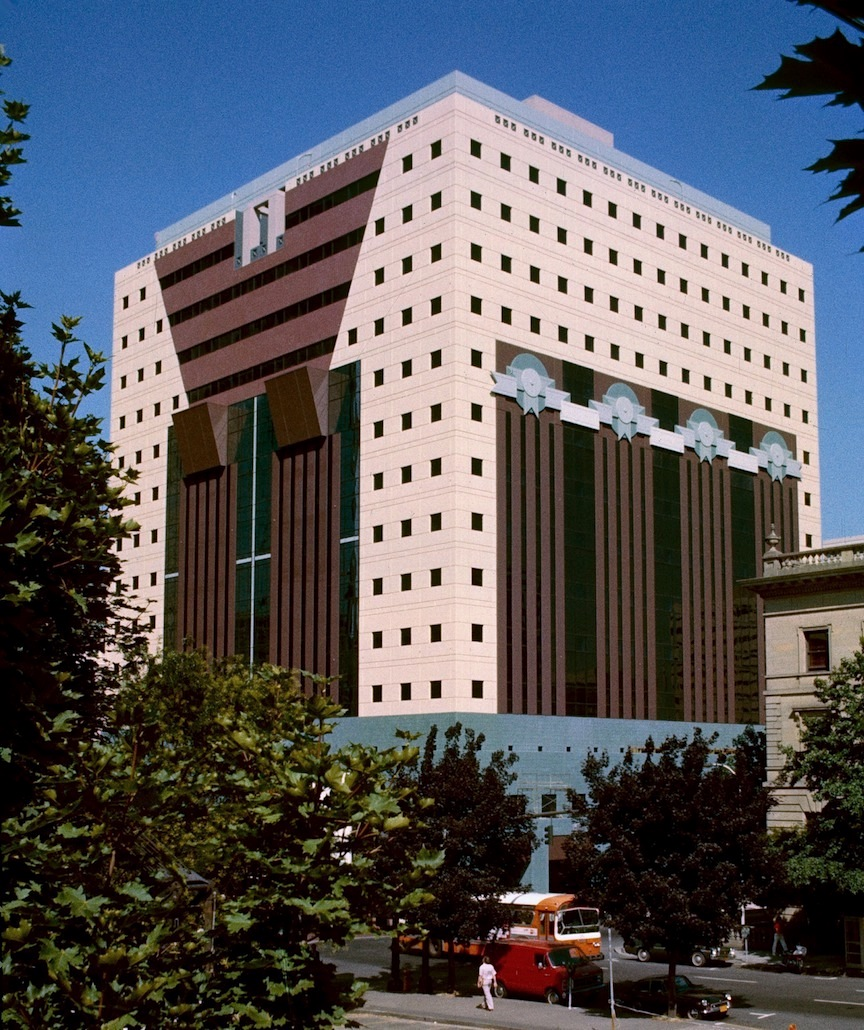
The Portland Building is often considered one of the "ugliest buildings in the world".

In 1982, the City of Portland completed the Portland Building. The building provides office space for city employees to supplement the limited space in Portland City Hall. The building, designed by Michael Graves, was unique for its inclusion of a variety of surface materials and colors, small windows, and inclusion of prominent decorative flourishes. When designing the building, Mayor Frank Ivancie wanted a building that stood out, echoing concerns from many in the community that the modernist style made downtowns look boring and lacking of character. The west side of the building is perched by the statue of Portlandia, the "personification of Portland" featured on the Seal of Portland. It is the second largest copper repoussé statue in the United States, after the Statue of Liberty. The Portland Building is often referred to as "one of the ugliest buildings in the world."

In 1983, the U.S. Bancorp Tower was completed. Designed by Pietro Belluschi, the building is notable for its unique pink color and windows that can absorb or reflect light differently depending upon how much light is upon them, earning it the nickname "Big Pink" by locals. Because of the unique street grid and the way the building was designed, the building looks either extremely slender or wide depending upon one's viewing angle. Since its construction, "Big Pink" has remained the second tallest building in Portland.

The next year, the KOIN Tower, Portland's third tallest building, was completed as part of a redevelopment project. The building is unique for its orange brick exterior and steel, sloping roof.

=== Tallest buildings ===
The city has had 9 recorded tallest buildings, the longest of which has been the Wells Fargo Center since 1972. The current tallest high-rises and skyscrapers in Portland (as of January 2025) are:

Rank	Name	Year	Location	Height ft (m)	Floors	Type	Source
1	Wells Fargo Center	1972	Downtown	546 (166.4)	40	Office	
2	U.S. Bancorp Tower "Big Pink"	1983	Downtown	536 (163.4)	42	Office	
3	KOIN Tower	1984	Downtown	509 (155.2)	35	Office	
4	Park Avenue West Tower	2016	Downtown	501 (153)	30	Office/Residential	
5	Block 216 Ritz-Carlton, Portland	2023	Downtown	460 (140.2)	35	Office/Hotel	
6	PacWest Center	1984	Downtown	418 (127.4)	30	Office	
7	Fox Tower	2000	Downtown	376 (113.4)	27	Office	
8	Standard Insurance Center	1968	Downtown	367 (111.9)	27	Office	
9	Cosmopolitan on the Park	2016	Pearl District	338 (103.6)	28	Residential	
10	The Ardea	2008	South Waterfront	330 (102.1)	31	Residential	
11	John Ross Tower	2007	South Waterfront	325 (99.1)	32	Residential	
11	Mirabella Portland	2010	South Waterfront	325 (99.1)	30	Residential	
12	Multnomah County Central Courthouse	2020	Downtown	324 (98.8)	17	Government	
13	Congress Center	1980	Downtown	321 (97.8)	23	Office	
14	Mark O. Hatfield United States Courthouse	1997	Downtown	318 (96.9)	16	Government	
15	Moda Tower	1999	Downtown	308 (93.9)	24	Office	
16	The Meriwether (West Building)	2006	South Waterfront	303 (92.4)	24	Residential	
17	Eleven West	2023	Downtown	300 (91)	24	Residential/Office	
18	Lloyd Center Tower	1981	Lloyd District	290 (88.4)	20	Office	
19	1000 Broadway	1991	Downtown	288 (87.8)	23	Office	
20	NV	2016	Pearl District	288 (87.7)	26	Residential	

== Other notable buildings ==
Other notable buildings in Portland include:

- The Armory, a Romanesque Revival former armory now used as a theater space.
- The Arlene Schnitzer Concert Hall, a restored historic theater (formerly The Paramount) and accompanying Heathman Hotel.
- The Benson Hotel, an elegant, restored historic hotel.
- Pietro Belluschi's Equitable Building was the first aluminum-clad building and the first to be completely sealed with an air-conditioned environment.
- Lloyd Center mall, Oregon's largest mall, opened in the summer of 1960.
- The Meier & Frank Building – Meier & Frank's full-block, glazed terra-cotta flagship department store.
- The Moda Center, home of the Portland Trail Blazers.
- The Oregon Convention Center's twin spires are a prominent feature on the eastside skyline.
- The Pioneer Courthouse, the oldest federal building in the Pacific Northwest and the second-oldest west of the Mississippi River.
- The Pittock Mansion is a popular tourist attraction.
- The Portland Building, by Michael Graves, the major post-modern building constructed in the U.S.
- The Seward Hotel, better known as the Governor Hotel (east wing), now part of the Sentinel Hotel.
- Union Station, an active Florentine-style train station with a 150 ft. clock tower.
- The United States National Bank Building, a large classical-style bank building built in 1917 that remains in near-original condition. This is the oldest extant branch of US Bank.
- One of the largest collections of cast iron architecture in the United States, primarily in Old Town. A classic example of such construction is the Grand Stable and Carriage Building, built by Oregon business pioneer Simeon Gannett Reed.

== Bridges ==
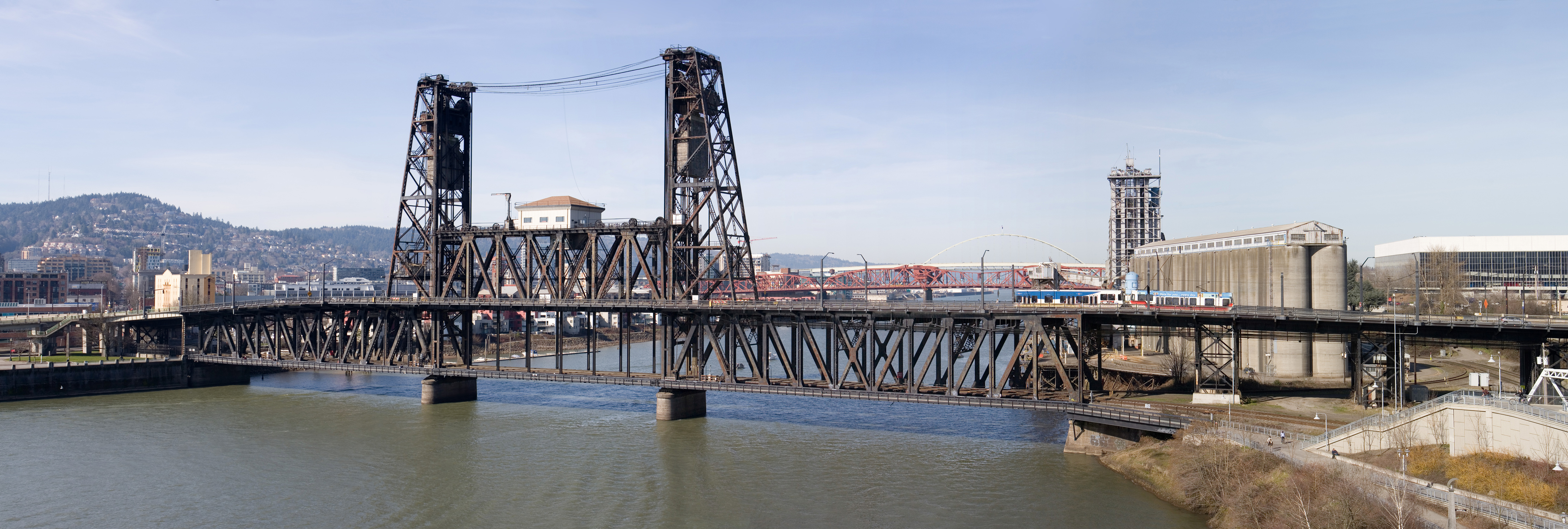
The Steel Bridge over the Willamette River

Portland has many bridges:

=== Bridges on the Willamette River ===
- St. Johns Bridge (1931; suspension)
- Burlington Northern Railroad Bridge 5.1 (1908 swing span converted in 1989 to vertical-lift)
- Fremont Bridge (1973; tied-arch)
- Broadway Bridge (1913; bascule truss)
- Steel Bridge (1912; steel through-truss, double-deck vertical lift)
- Burnside Bridge (1926; bascule draw)
- Morrison Bridge (1958; bascule draw)
- Hawthorne Bridge (1910; through truss, vertical lift)
- Marquam Bridge (1966; through truss)
- Tilikum Crossing (2015; cable-stayed)
- Ross Island Bridge (1926; cantilever truss)
- Sellwood Bridge (2016; deck arch)

=== Bridges on the Columbia River ===
- Glenn L. Jackson Memorial Bridge (1982; segregated concrete box girder)
- Interstate Bridge (1917/1958; through truss, vertical lift)
- Burlington Northern Railroad Bridge 9.6 (1908; with a 450-foot swing section)

=== Other bridges ===
- Vista Bridge

== See also ==
- List of sports venues in Portland, Oregon
- National Register of Historic Places listings in Portland
