= TMT Development =

- Type: Privately held company
- Industry: Commercial real estate
- Founded: 1988; 38 years ago
- Founder: Thomas P. Moyer
- Headquarters: Fox Tower; Portland, Oregon
- Key people: Vanessa C. Sturgeon, President
- Website: www.tmtdevelopment.com

TMT Development was a real estate development company based in Portland, Oregon. It was founded in 1988 by Tom Moyer.

The company used to own and operate 8.5 million square feet of commercial real estate throughout Oregon and southwest Washington state. It was among the largest real estate companies in Portland.

== History ==
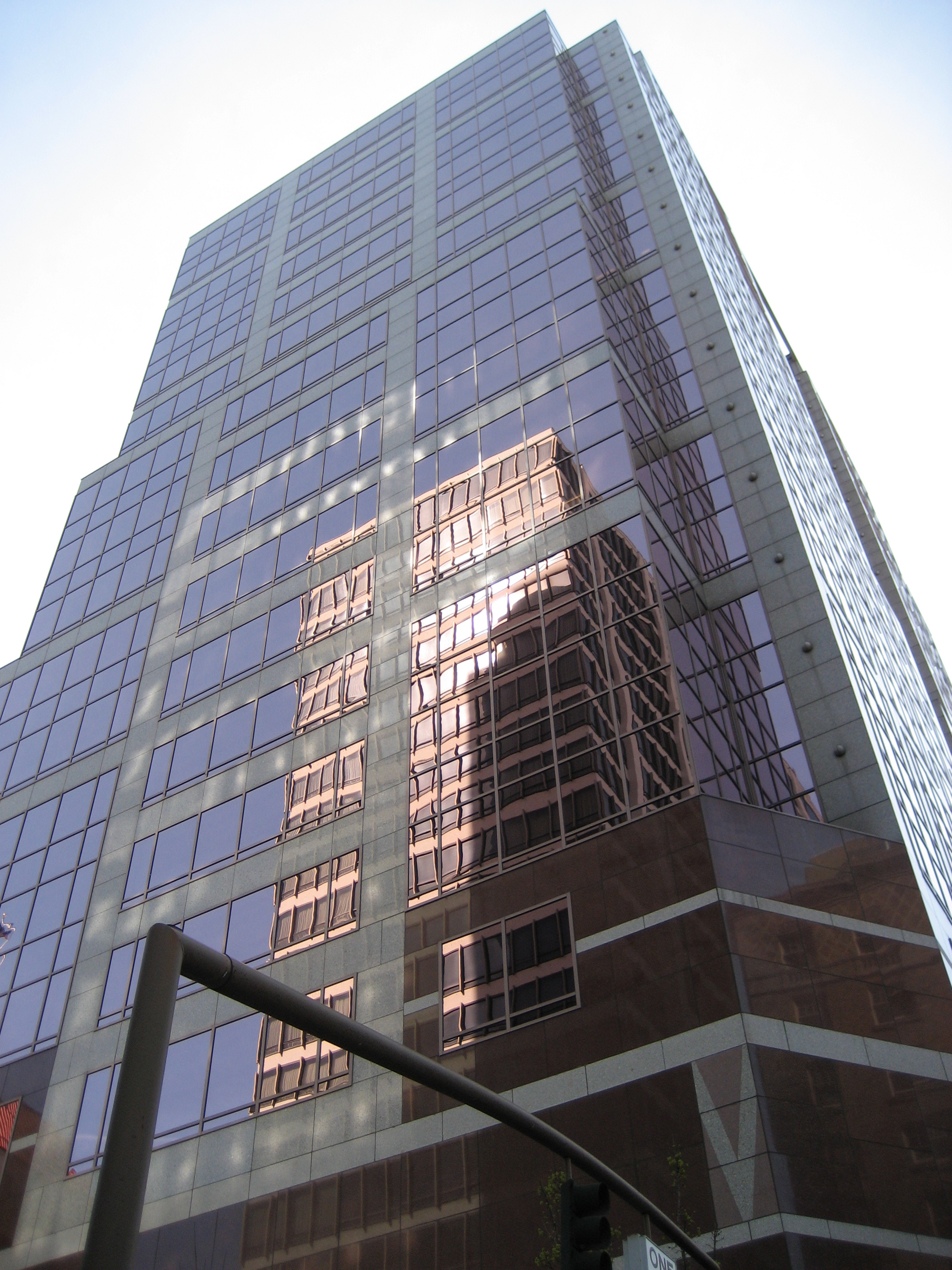
1000 Broadway

In 1988, the company was founded by Tom Moyer.

In 1991, the company partnered with the Hillman Group to develop a 24-story office building in downtown Portland at 1000 Broadway, blocks from Pioneer Courthouse Square. The Hillman Group later sold its interest in the building to TMT Development.

In 2000, the company completed Fox Tower, designed by TVA Architects and built by Hoffman Construction Company.

In 2011, the family of the founder was engaged in a legal dispute over control when the founder was suffering from alzheimer's disease.

The 30-story mixed-use Park Avenue West, located next to Director Park and the Fox Tower in downtown Portland, was completed in 2016. By May 2016, the office space had been leased. By August 2017, the residential portion was 90% leased. The building was taller than normally allowed by the building code, however TMT made a deal with the city that in exchange for exception from the zoning code on building height, the building would utilize union janitors and security, however these union jobs were not fulfilled. In June 2019, Service Employees International Union Local 49 filed a lawsuit seeking to make this happen.

=== Shooting by contracted security guard ===
In 2021, Freddy Nelson Jr was shot and killed by Logan Gimbel at Delta Park Center, a shopping center managed by TMT Development on behalf of Hayden Meadows in North Portland. Gimbel was employed as an armed security guard by Cornerstone Security Group, a private security company contracted by TMT Development to patrol Delta Park Center in response to drug dealing and fights at an OBRC BottleDrop located on site. When a reporter from The Oregonian visited the site in May 2025, she observed open air drug use and suspected dealing at the BottleDrop. Nelson had an arrangement with the branch of Lowes at Delta Park Center to collect their used pallets and was regularly confronted by Cornerstone security guards. On the 29 May 2021 Nelson and his wife were in their vehicle in Lowes' parking lot when Gimbel approached and confronted Nelson. Gimbel escalated the situation and deployed pepper spray before shooting Nelson four times through the windshield as he tried to escape, dying at the scene. Gimbel was not licensed to carry a firearm in the course of his duties at the time of the shooting. Despite claiming self defence, he was convicted of second degree murder, unlawful use of a firearm and unlawful use of Mace in May 2023 and sentenced to life in prison.

Nelson's wife brought civil suit against TMT Development, Meadows, three representatives of Cornerstone and Gimbel for negligence and wrongful death. In 2024, a jury found Cornerstone and Gimbel’s conduct reckless while negligence was attributed 80% to TMT Development, 10% to Lowes and 10% to Nelson. The jury awarded $20 Million in compensatory damages and $1.25 Million in punitive damages against Gimbel and two Cornerstone officials.
