= McKenzie Apartments =

Residential high-rise building in Seattle, Washington

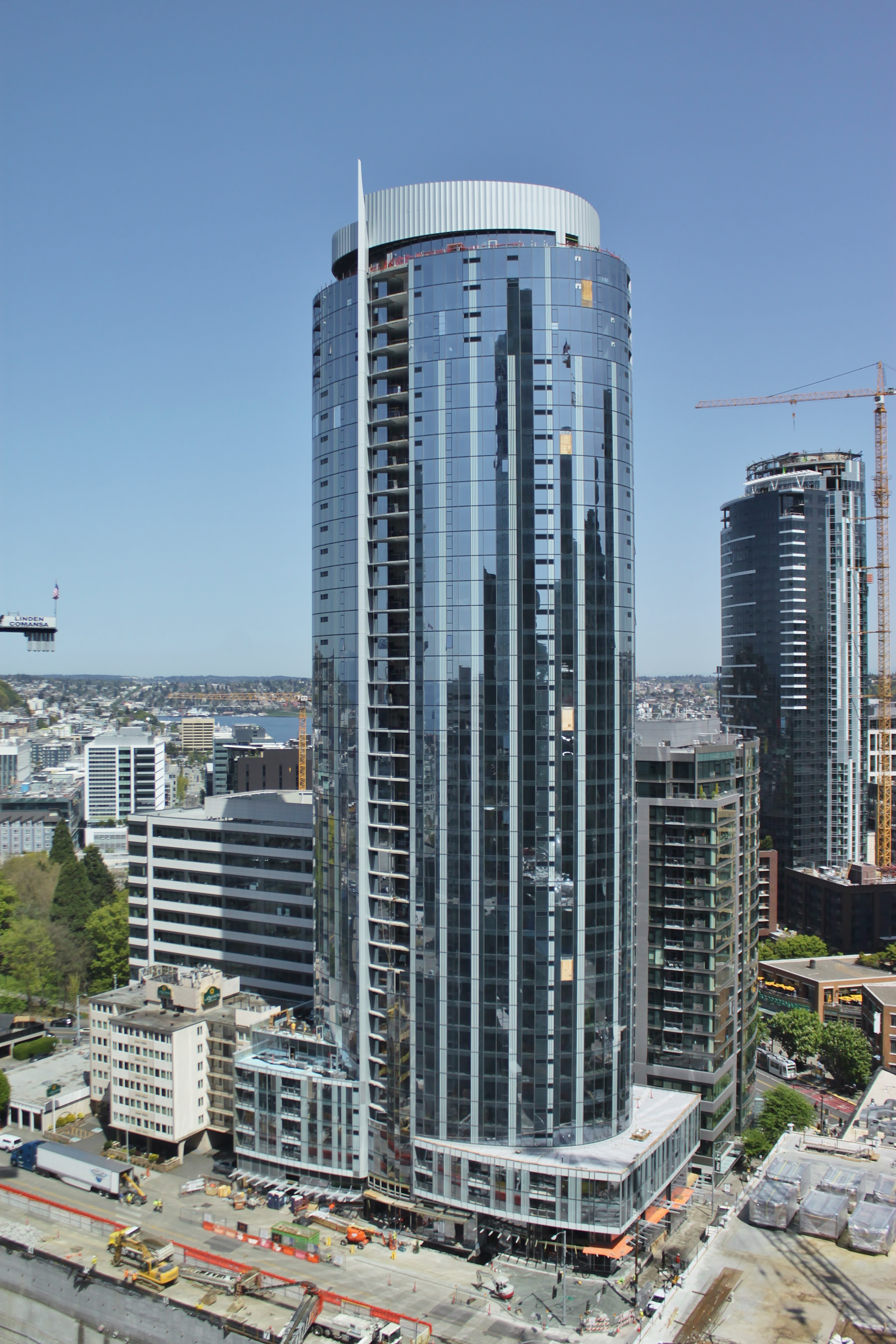
- Under construction in April 2018

- Location within downtown Seattle

General information
- Status: Completed
- Type: Residential
- Location: 2208 8th Avenue; Seattle, Washington
- Coordinates: 47°37′03.68″N 122°20′21.50″W
- Construction started: January 2016
- Estimated completion: July 2018

Height
- Antenna spire: 450 feet (140 m)
- Roof: 400 feet (120 m)

Technical details
- Floor count: 40

Design and construction
- Architecture firm: Graphite Design Group
- Developer: Clise Properties
- Main contractor: Hoffman Construction

Other information
- Number of units: 450 apartments
- Parking: 350 parking stalls

The McKenzie Apartments is a residential high-rise building in Seattle, Washington. The 40-story skyscraper, located in the Denny Triangle neighborhood, was completed in 2018 and has 450 apartments.

== History ==
Clise Properties, which owned much of the Denny Triangle prior to the 2010s development boom, proposed a 40-story high-rise residential building on the site in early 2014. An elliptical design was unveiled in October 2014, at the request of a design review committee and residents of a nearby condominium building.

The $284 million project, partially funded by a loan from the Bank of the Ozarks, broke ground in December 2015. It opened in July 2018.

== Details ==
The ground floor includes a Wild Ginger restaurant, the company's third location in the Seattle area, which opened in August 2018.
