= Tom Moyer =

American businessman

- Born: March 2, 1919; Portland, Oregon, U.S.
- Died: November 28, 2014 (aged 95); Portland, Oregon, U.S.

Thomas P. Moyer (March 2, 1919 – November 28, 2014) was an American movie theater chain magnate, real estate developer, and philanthropist from Oregon. Moyer was known for his lightweight boxing career, his career in entertainment, and for developing several real estate projects, including the 1000 Broadway Building, Fox Tower and Park Avenue West Tower.

== Biography ==
Moyer was born on March 2, 1919, in Portland, Oregon. He grew up in the Sellwood area of Portland and went to St. Agatha's Catholic School until eighth grade and then dropped out of school as a freshman to start an amateur boxing career. Known as "Tommy," he was a lightweight boxer with 145 victories of 156 amateur fights. Moyer is recognized as one of the greatest boxers ever produced by the state of Oregon, and was inducted into the Oregon Sports Hall of Fame in 1999. He was undefeated as a welterweight in 22 professional fights. He was Northwest Champion from 1935 to 1941, a five-time Pacific Coast Champion, a National AAU State Champion, a National Diamond Belt Champion, and an International Diamond Belt Champion. He fought Sugar Ray Robinson in a five-round amateur bout in Rochester, New York; the winner would go to the 1940 Olympics. Robinson was the winner in a close decision; Moyer was later named to the team after Robinson turned professional. This was Moyer's last defeat in his boxing career. Moyer trained as a member of the U.S. Olympic Boxing team for the Helsinki, Finland Olympics of 1940 but the games were cancelled because of the breakout of World War II.

In 1941, Moyer joined the U.S. Army and served for four years in the I Company, 186th Regiment, 41st Infantry Division. He was stationed in the Southwest Pacific territory that covered Australia, New Guinea and the Philippines. In 1946, Moyer married Marilyn Byrne; they had four children. Moyer's parents, Harry and Rose, owned a movie theater in Sellwood where Moyer worked and learned the theater business.

In 1966, Moyer opened Eastgate Theater in Portland, the first multi-screen theater in the region. During the 1970s and 1980s, he grew the theater chain throughout Oregon, Washington, Alaska, Nevada and California. By 1989, he owned 298 screens, making the chain the nation's tenth-largest theater circuit at the time, and the largest privately owned theater circuit in the United States. Moyer also purchased much of the land that theaters were on and later leased the land back to the theaters, spurring his interest in real estate.

In 1989, Moyer sold his theater circuit to Act III Cinemas (now Regal Cinemas) a year after his wife, Marilyn Moyer, died.

In 2011, due to advanced age, he was declared legally incompetent.

In 2012, it was reported that Moyer needed to designate a trustee for his real estate trust, because he was unable to fill that role any longer due to Alzheimer's disease. The Oregonian reported the week-long trial was "one of Portland's most high-stakes and emotional family squabbles."

Tom Moyer died on November 28, 2014, at the age of 95.

== TMT Development ==
In 1991, Moyer formed TMT Development, a real estate development and property management firm, in Portland. Moyer partnered to develop the 1000 Broadway Building in 1991. The Fox Tower was completed in 2000 and the Park Avenue West Tower, located next to Director Park, was completed in 2016. Moyer retired in 2010. Moyer's granddaughter, Vanessa Sturgeon, is currently President of TMT Development.
