= RingSide Steakhouse =

Restaurant in Portland, Oregon, U.S.

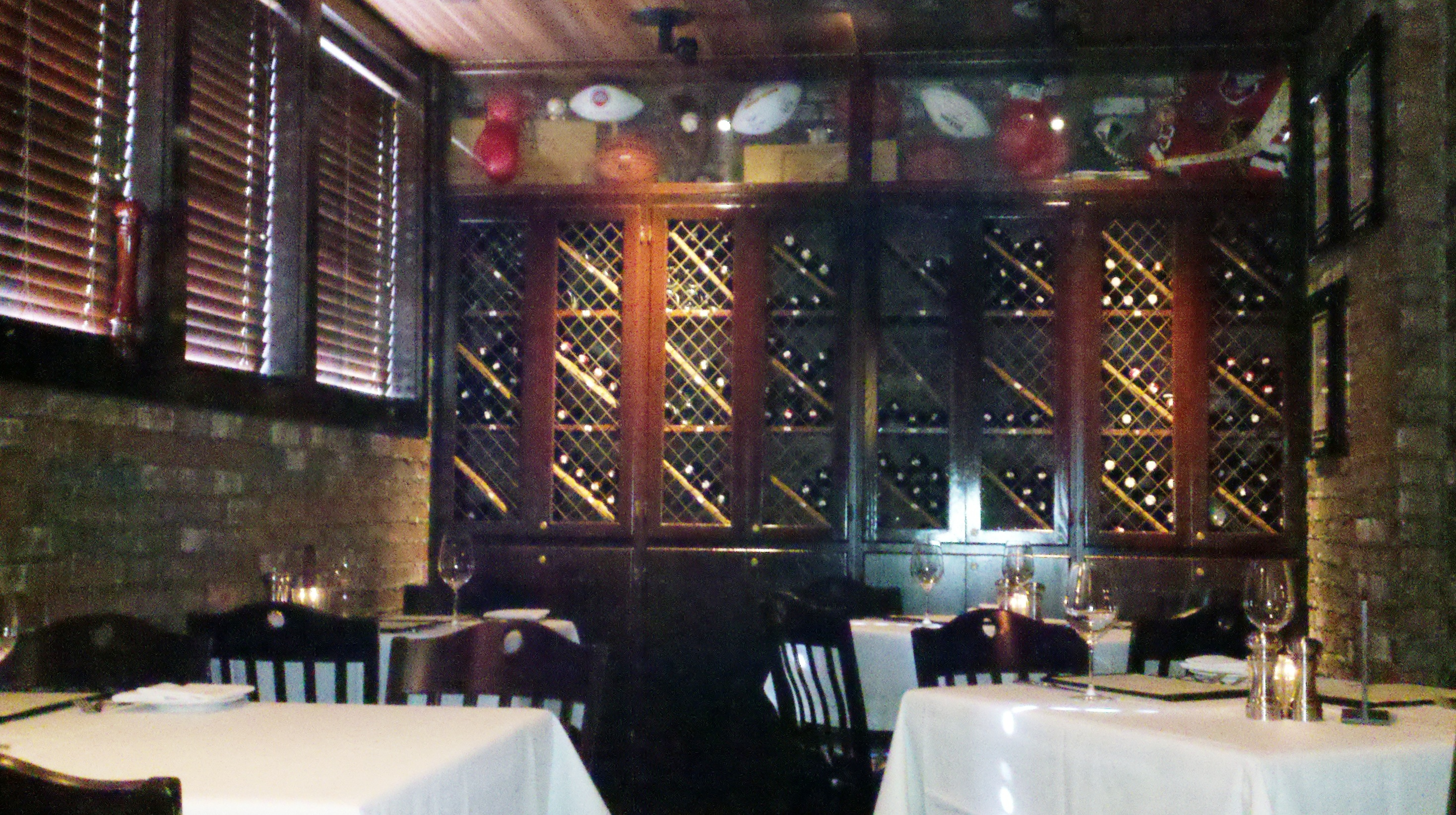
- Dining room in 2011
- Interactive map of RingSide Steakhouse

Restaurant information
- Established: 1944
- Location: 2165 West Burnside Street, Portland, Oregon, 97210, United States
- Coordinates: 45.5235°N 122.6958°W
- Other locations: 14021 NE Glisan Street; Portland, Oregon 97230
- Website: www.ringsidesteakhouse.com

RingSide Steakhouse is a restaurant located in Portland, Oregon, United States.

== History ==
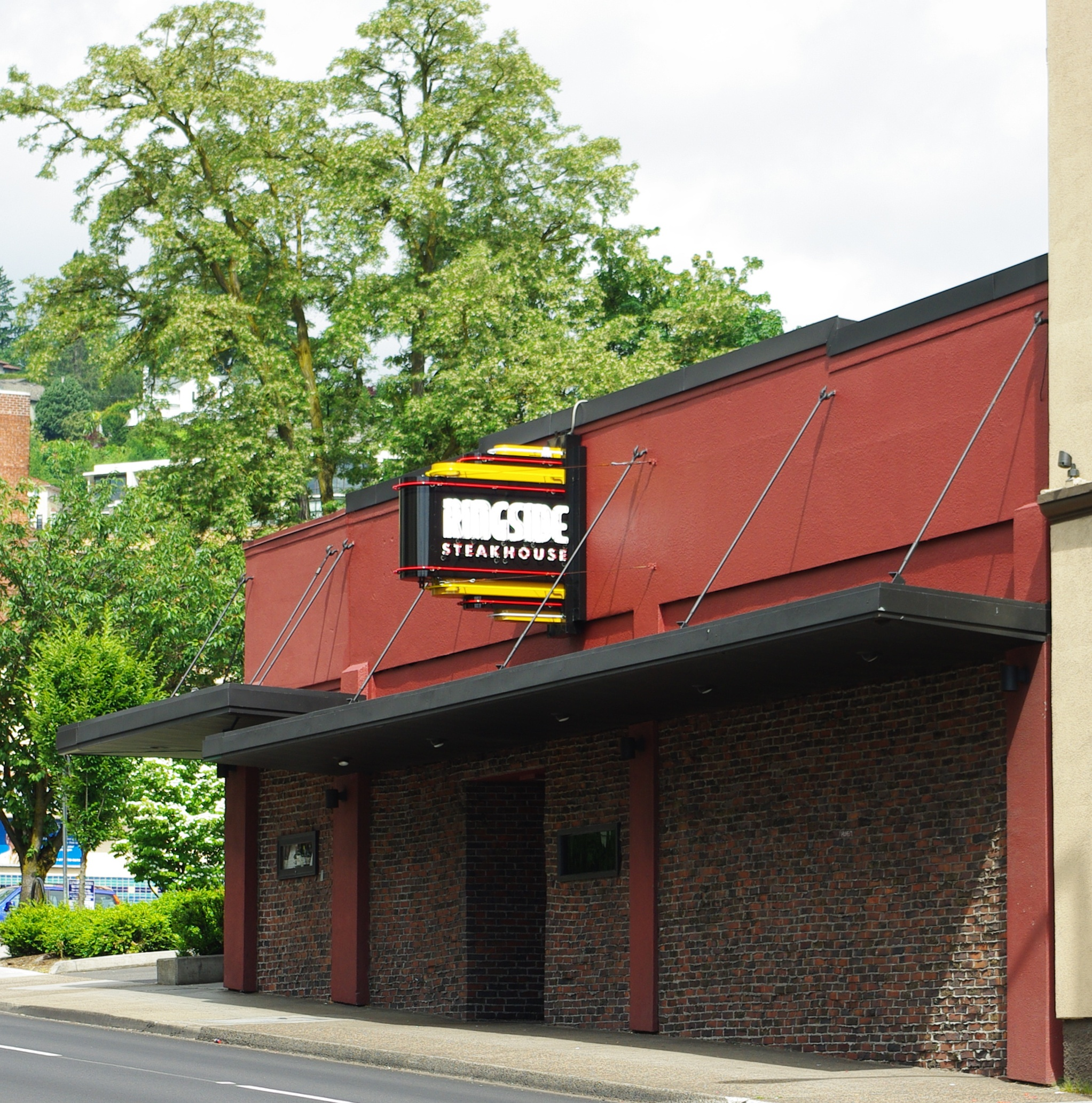
Exterior of the West Burnside location, 2014

The RingSide has been one of the city's most famous steakhouses for more than 60 years and, in addition to the original location on West Burnside Street, it has opened a second restaurant on the East side of the Willamette River. The name refers to the establishment's boxing decor theme. In 2010, the restaurant temporarily moved the original location to the Fox Tower while the Burnside location was remodeled. A year later, they opened RingSide Fish House at the Fox Tower location. The east side location at the Glendoveer Golf Course was set to close for a remodel in January 2015.

The Glendoveer location reopened as the Ringside Grill. The Ringside Grill's last day of business was August 30, 2017.

In late April 2020, during the COVID-19 pandemic, RingSide sold frozen boxes of steak directly to the general public for the first time in 75 years. The move caused a mile-long traffic jam along West Burnside Street, and products sold out in less than 2.5 hours.

Later in 2020, RingSide filed a lawsuit against their insurer, Cincinnati Financial, for $236,000 for the loss of business and expenses caused by the COVID-19 pandemic.

In 2021, Cincinnati Financial sued RingSide seeking a judgement declaring RingSide's revenue losses from lower customer traffic as a result of wildfire smoke were not covered by their policy.

In April 2025, a kitchen fire forced the restaurant to close temporarily. It is slated to reopen on August 4.

== Reception ==
RingSide has garnered more than 40 regional and national awards throughout its history. Willamette Week readers ranked RingSide first place in the following categories: "Best Meat-Eater's Palace" (2004), "Best Steakhouse" (2005), and "Best Steak" (2006). RingSide was a runner-up in the "Best Happy Hour" category of Willamette Week's "Best of Portland Readers' Poll 2020". Brooke Jackson-Glidden included the onion rings in Eater Portland's 2024 overview of "iconic" Portland dishes. The business was included in Time Out Portland's 2025 list of the city's eighteen best restaurants.

== See also ==
- Food Paradise (season 13)
