= RingSide Fish House =

Defunct seafood restaurant in Portland, Oregon, U.S.

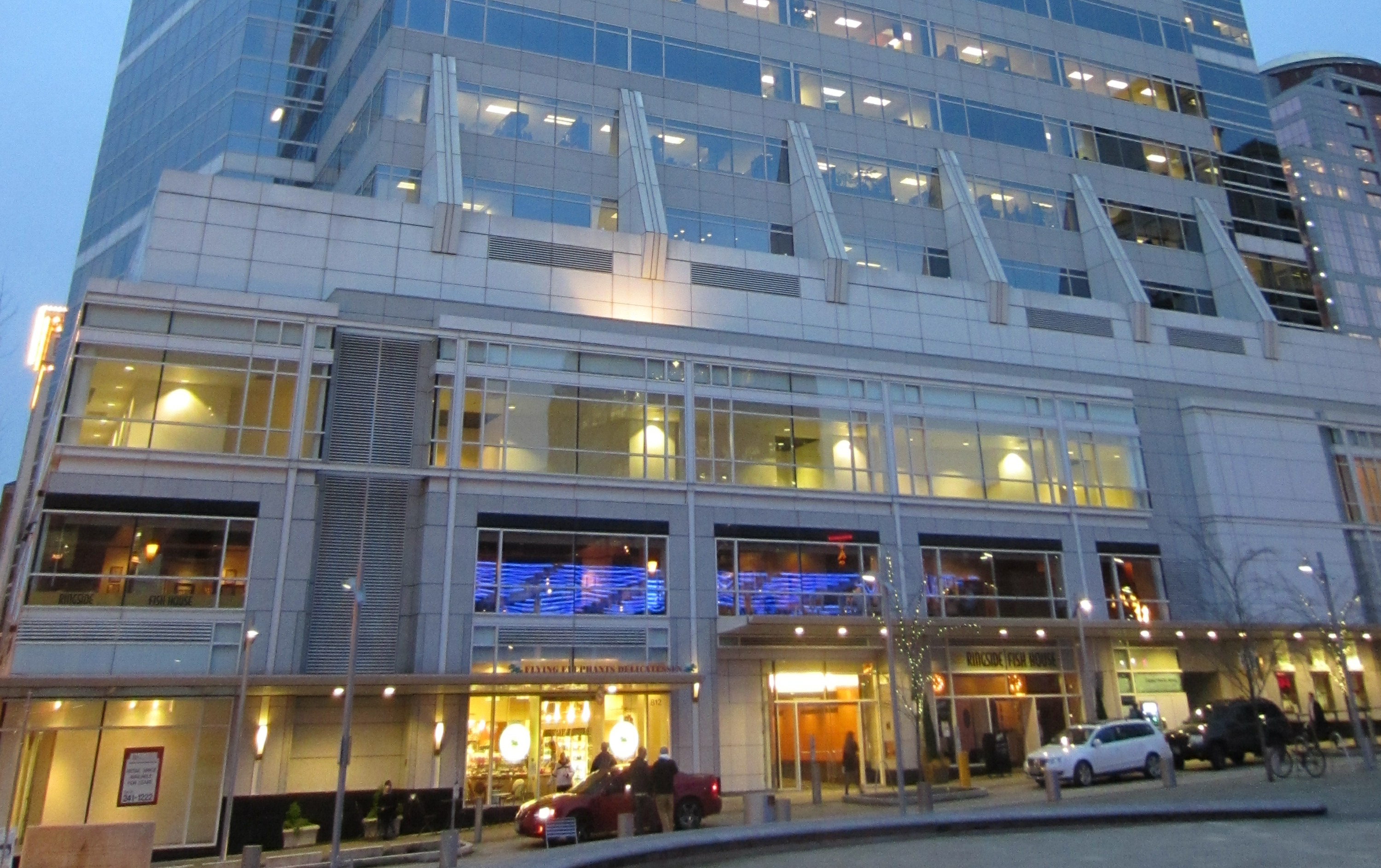
- The restaurant was housed in the Fox Tower (pictured in 2012)
- Interactive map of RingSide Fish House

Restaurant information
- Established: July 18, 2011
- Closed: August 12, 2018
- Owner: RingSide Hospitality Group
- Food type: Seafood
- Location: 838 Southwest Park Avenue, Portland, Multnomah, Oregon, 97205, United States
- Coordinates: 45.5187°N 122.6809°W

RingSide Fish House was a seafood restaurant in Portland, Oregon. The business operated in southwest Portland's Fox Tower from 2011 to 2018.

== Description ==
Mattie John Bamman of Eater Portland described RingSide Fish House as an "old-school" seafood restaurant in the Fox Tower next to southwest Portland's Director Park. In addition to fish, the restaurant served steak, oysters, Crab Louie, lobster, cioppino, poke, and onion rings.

The happy hour menu included hibiscus punch, as well as oysters for $1 each, as of 2017. Other drinks included in the El Diablo (tequila, blackberry syrup, ginger beer) and the "Five" O "Three" (pear brandy, apple brandy, lemon juice, cinnamon syrup, apple syrup, lemon twist).

== History ==
In 2011, the owner of RingSide Steakhouse confirmed plans to convert a temporary Fox Tower location into a seafood restaurant. The 240-seat restaurant opened on the building's second floor on July 18, 2011, with Johnny Nunn as the initial executive chef. RingSide started with happy hour and dinner service.

Jennie Peterson, the daughter of RingSide owner Craig Peterson, was the general manager, as of 2014, and David Ezelle was executive chef, as of April 2015. Jonathan Gill was the executive chef from 2016 to 2018. Trever Gilbert was also a chef at the restaurant.

In 2016, Ringside Fish House hosted Take Your Kids to Work Day, offering lunch to children at no cost.

In July 2018, Peterson and RingSide Hospitality Group announced plans to close the seafood restaurant on August 12, after operating for seven years.

== Reception ==
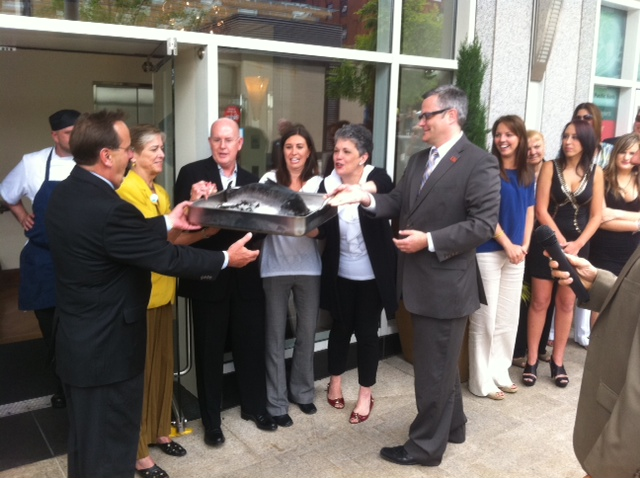
Mayor Sam Adams at the restaurant's opening, 2011

In 2015 and 2018, RingSide Fish House received a Best Of Award of Excellence from Wine Spectator as part of the magazine's annual restaurant awards.

Eater Portland included RingSide Fish House in a 2015 overview of "where to get your East Coast lobster fix in Portland". The website's Heather Arndt Anderson included the restaurant in a 2017 overview of "where to eat and drink Like a pirate in Portland". She wrote, "If you want Salty's menu options and buttoned-up atmosphere without that pesky riverfront view, there's always Ringside. It's a nice spot for a fancy downtown dinner date."

Michael Russell included Ringside Fish House in The Oregonian's 2016 list of Portland's 12 best oyster bars. The restaurant ranked third in the Best Seafood Restaurant category of Willamette Week's annual "Best of Portland" readers' poll. In Unique Eats and Eateries of Portland, Oregon (2018), Adam Sawyer called RingSide Fish House "the perfect Yin to the steakhouse's Yang" and said the restaurant "proudly sports one of the best early and late-night happy hour menus in Portland". RingSide Fish House received "honorable mention in Russell's list of "Portland's 25 most painful restaurant closures of 2018".

== See also ==
- List of seafood restaurants
