= Broadway Theatre (Portland, Oregon) =

Former theater in Portland, Oregon, U.S.

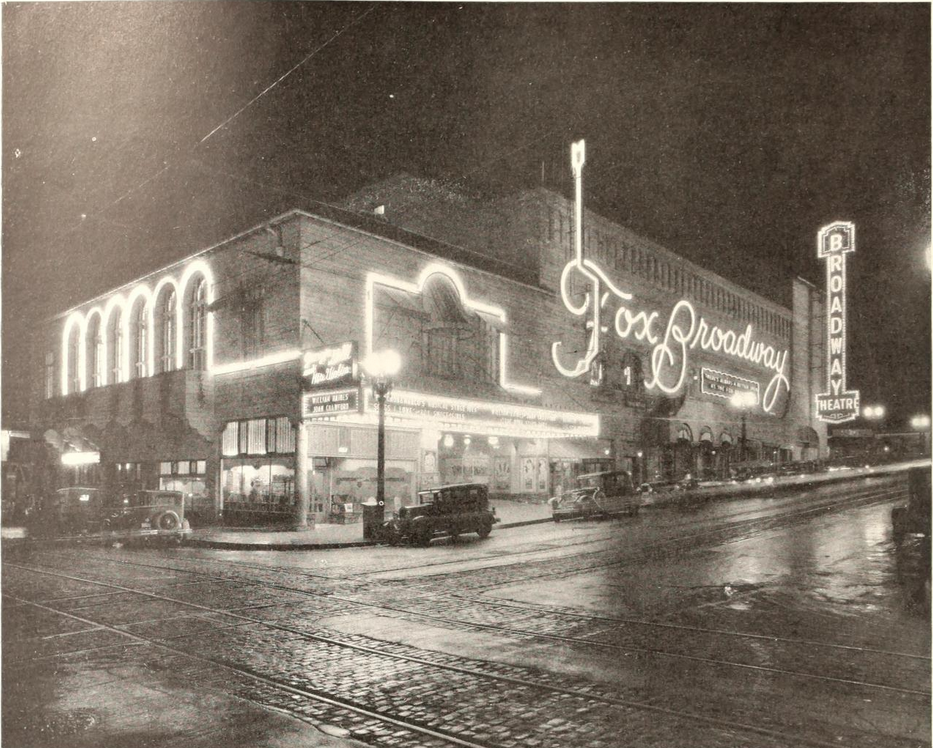
- The theatre's exterior in 1929
- Interactive map of Broadway Theatre
- Location: Portland, Oregon, United States
- Coordinates: 45.5172863°N 122.6829282°W

Construction
- Opened: 1926
- Demolished: 1988

Broadway Theatre was a theatre in downtown Portland, Oregon, operating from 1926 until the 1980s. The building was demolished in 1988 and replaced with the 1000 Broadway building.
