= Wild Ginger (restaurant) =

Restaurant in Washington, U.S.

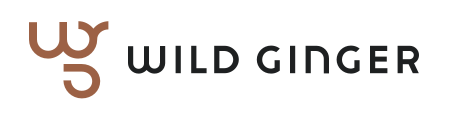

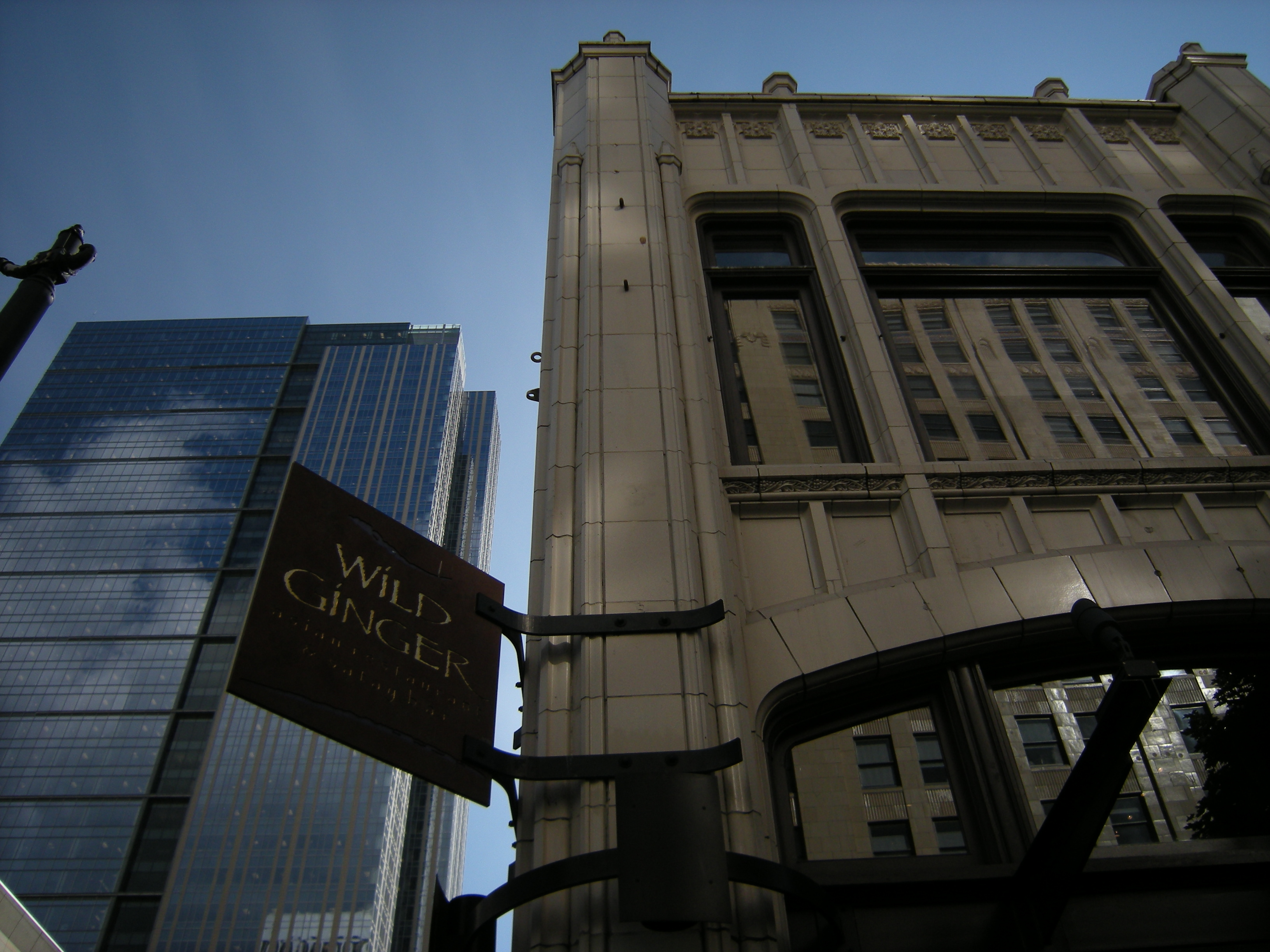
- Sign for the restaurant in Downtown Seattle, 2008
- Interactive map of Wild Ginger

Restaurant information
- Coordinates: 47.6088°N 122.3375°W
- Website: www.wildginger.net

Wild Ginger is a restaurant with multiple locations in the Seattle metropolitan area, in the U.S. state of Washington. The business was established in 1989 and has been recognized by the James Beard Foundation for its wine program.

== History ==
The business was established in 1989. The original chef was Jeem Han Lock, a 53 year old Chinese-born chef who immigrated to San Francisco at the age of 12, and who previously worked at restaurants Rosellini's Four-10, The Other Place, Four Seasons, and Bellevue Red Lion. Lock left Wild Ginger in 2001.

In 2018, Wild Ginger opened their third location at the base of McKenzie Apartments, a high-rise building in Seattle's Denny Triangle neighborhood adjacent to the Amazon headquarters campus.

== Menu ==
Wild Ginger serves a "Pan-Asian" menu that the restaurant describes as based on China and Southeast Asia. Its specialties include "seven-flavor beef" and Szechuan green beans.

== Reception ==
Executive chef Jeem Han Lock received the 1997 James Beard Award for "Best Chef in the Pacific Northwest and Hawaii", after being nominated in the 1996 edition.

In 2007, The New York Times said Wild Ginger was "often ranked among Seattle's best restaurants". Wild Ginger was ranked Seattle's most popular restaurant in Zagat's 2009 survey. In 2017 and 2018, Wild Ginger was a semifinalist for the James Beard Foundation Award for Outstanding Wine Program.

In 2014, the Seattle Post-Intelligencer rated Wild Ginger's second location 1.5/4 stars for food, 2.5/4 for service, and 2/4 for ambiance, respectively.

== See also ==
- List of restaurant chains in the United States
