= Park Avenue West Tower =

Mixed-use high-rise tower in Portland Oregon

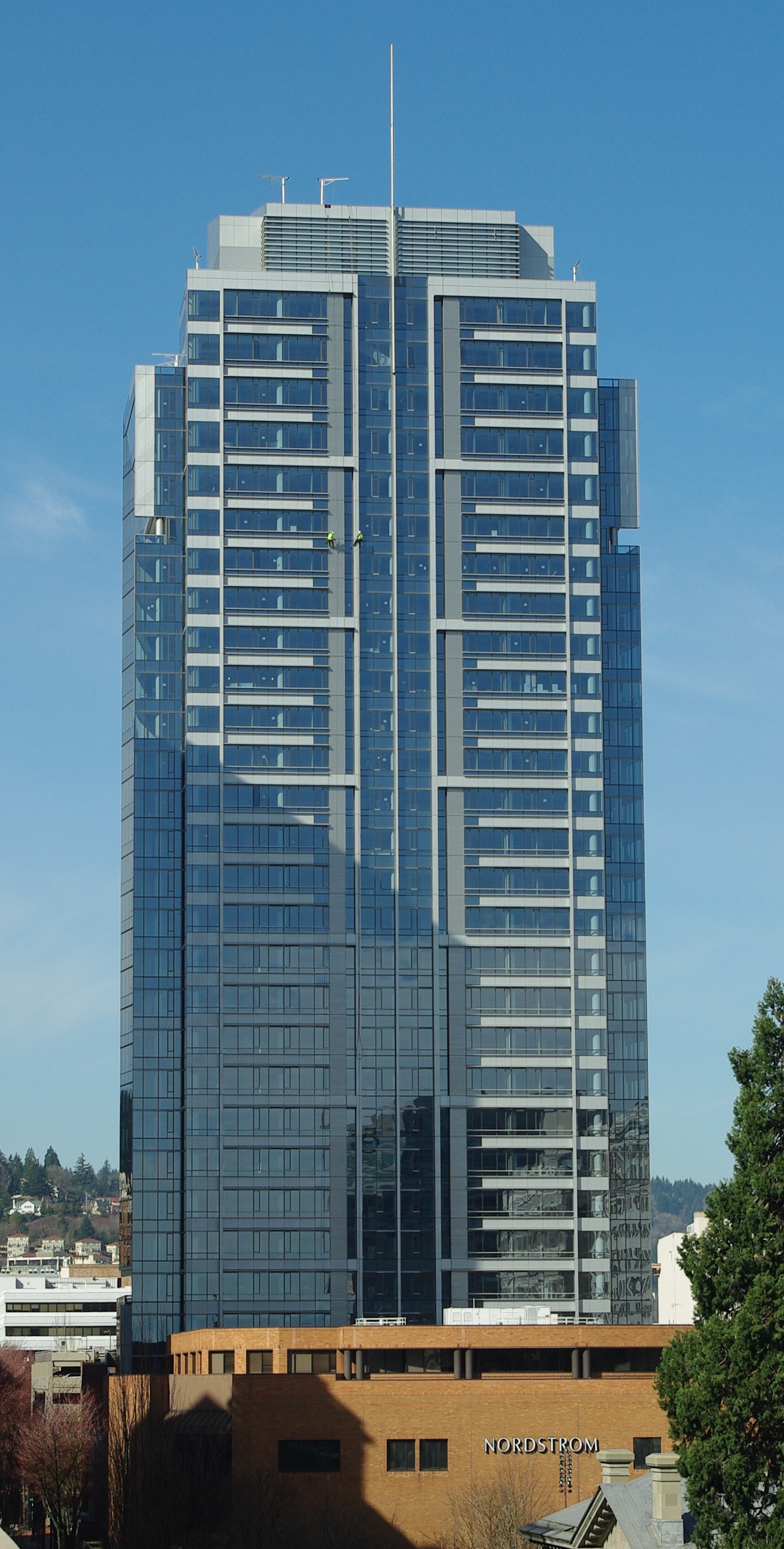
- Park Avenue West Tower eastern face

- Location within Portland, Oregon

General information
- Status: Completed
- Type: retail, office, apartments
- Location: 750 SW 9th Ave, Portland, Oregon, United States
- Coordinates: 45.519368°N 122.681067°W
- Completed: 2016
- Opening: 2016
- Owner: TMT Development

Height
- Antenna spire: 502 feet (153 m)
- Roof: 460 feet (140 m)

Technical details
- Floor count: 30
- Floor area: 474,000 sq ft (44,000 m^{2})
- Lifts/elevators: 10

Design and construction
- Architect: TVA Architects
- Developer: TMT Development
- Main contractor: Hoffman Construction

Park Avenue West Tower is a high-rise in downtown Portland, Oregon, United States. The 30-floor tower consists of commercial office space, ground floor retail, and apartments. It is the fourth tallest building in Portland behind the Wells Fargo Center, KOIN Center and the US Bancorp Tower. Developed by TMT Development and designed by TVA Architects. The building is taller than allowed by the zoning code at the time. A deal was made with the city for a variance in exchange for employing union workers—fulfillment is still under dispute.

== History ==
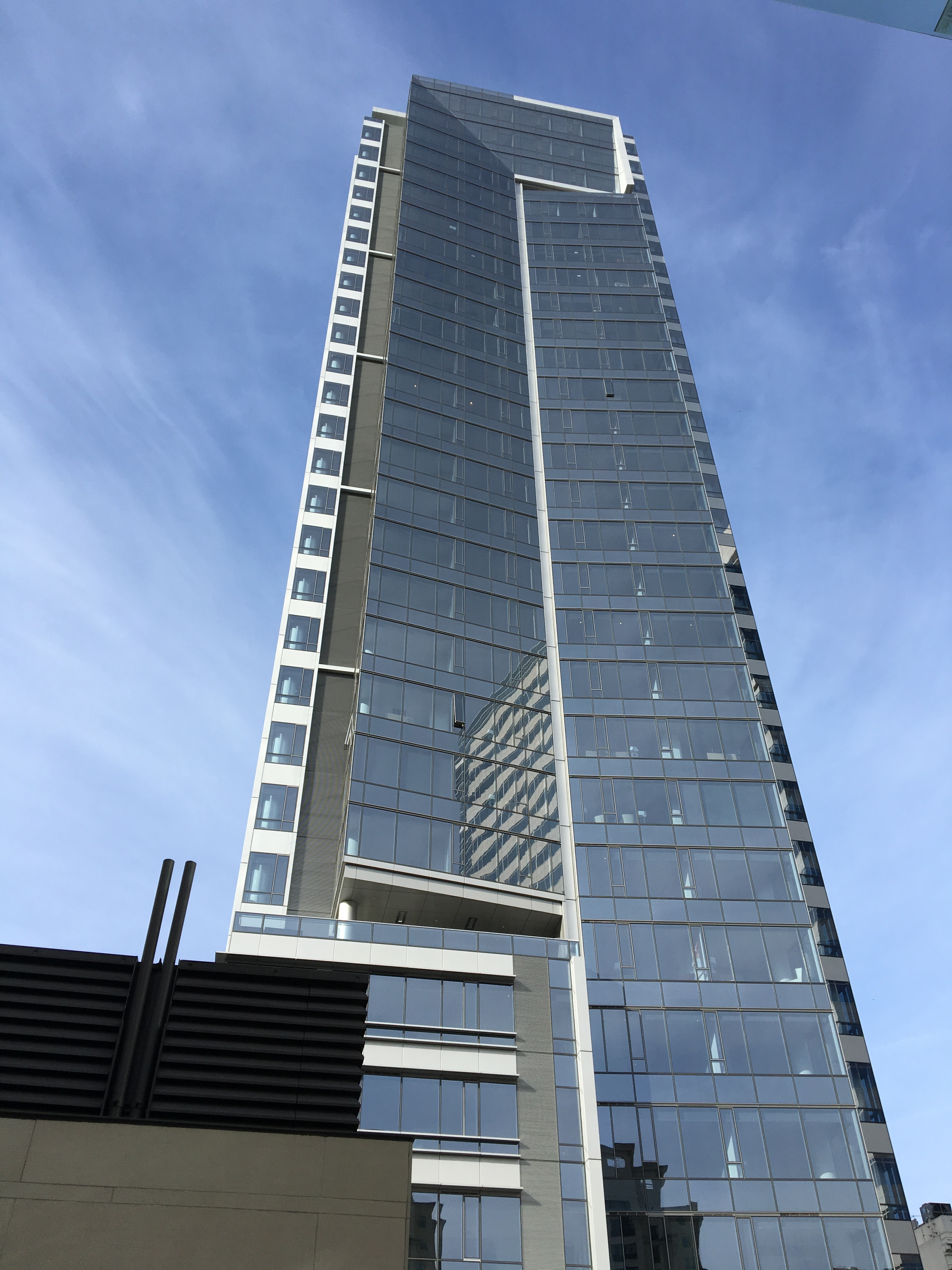
The western face of the tower from Director Park

Park Avenue West Tower was initially scheduled to be completed in 2010 and was being developed by TMT Development. The tower was to have a total of 33 floors and offer retail space, office space and 85 housing units. The housing component was later dropped from the plans. It was also to have a six floor underground garage with 325 parking spaces. The building gained the top four floors when developers agreed to add 1,650 square feet (153 m^{2}) of bike facilities (including public bicycle commuter showers, bike parking, and locker space) under the connected Director Park subsurface parking, gaining the tower a 40-to-1 bonus.

Construction on the building was suddenly suspended in April 2009 Despite the suspension of construction, the developer was hopeful to get the building back on track by reducing the number of stories in the structure resulting from removal of the top ten floors which would have been condominium space. The building was about 50% leased, with Stoel Rives as the primary tenant (11 floors, 157,000 square feet), as well as a NikeTown store. The Park Avenue site was considered an eyesore as there was only a foundation and construction debris visible for 4 1/2 years, earning the nickname "Moyer's Ruins".

TMT Development announced in December 2011 that work would resume in late 2013. Construction resumed in October 2013 after additional re-designs, with completion expected in early 2016. Plans called for 30 floors, with 15 of those housing 202 apartments. It topped out in February 2015 with a final height of 502 feet (153 m). The tower opened in February 2016 and was 92% occupied. Shortly after opening, MetLife provided $130 million in permanent financing for the building.

== Zoning code and union labor deal ==
The 30 story tower is taller than permitted by statutes of the zoning code. In 2014, city officials and the developer negotiated a deal to let them build 30 stories in exchange for utilizing union cleaners and security guards. These union jobs however did not happen. In March 2019, the labor union SEIU Local 49 hung a banner from the 11th floor windows as part of their protest and they have done so by renting a two-bedroom short term rental for two days. In August 2018, The Oregonian identified more than 20 out of 202 units at the Park Avenue West were utilized as short term rentals without permit. In June 2019, the SEIU Local 49 filed a lawsuit for union jobs to be created.

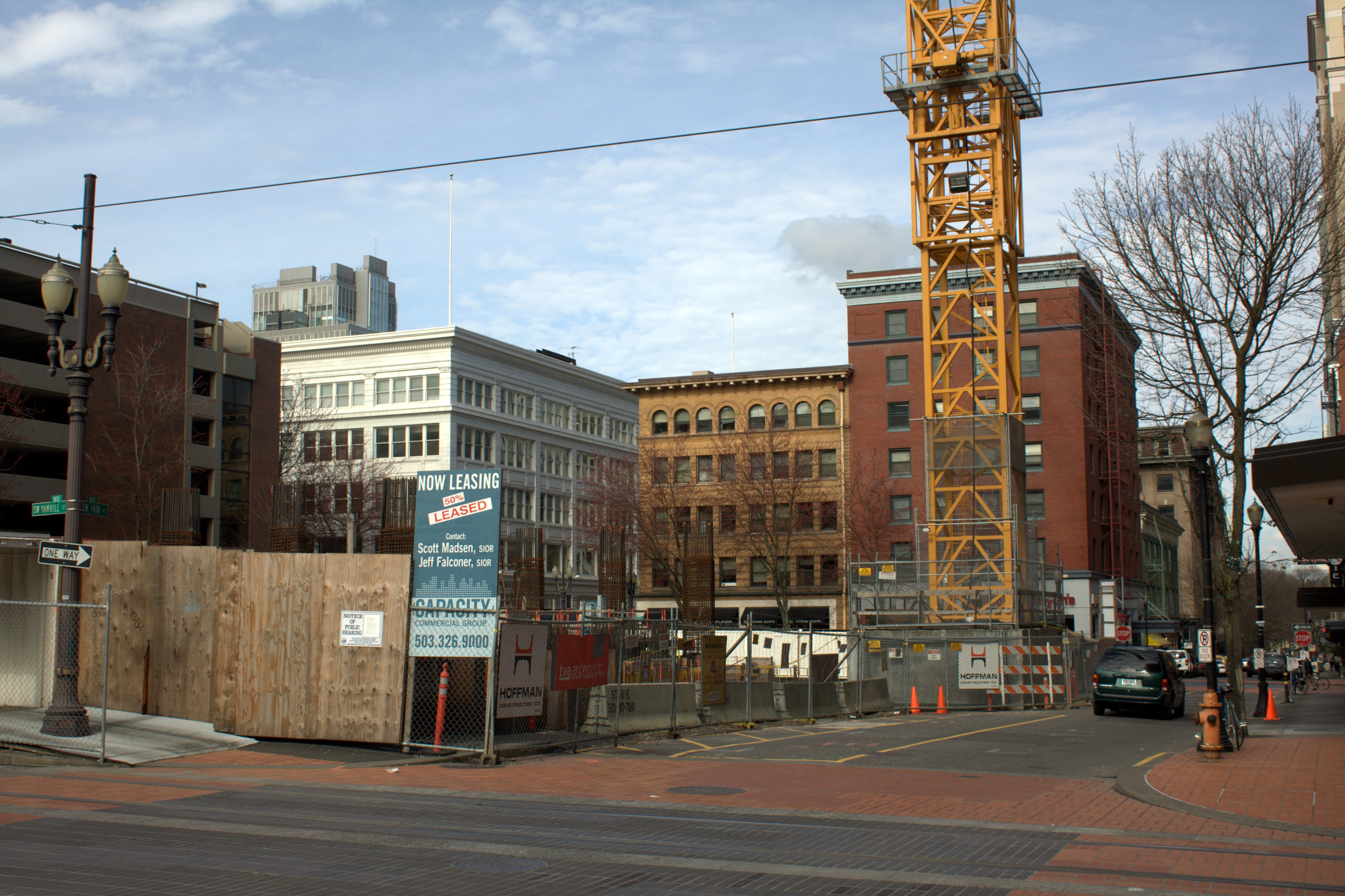
Construction site (ground level view), February 2010

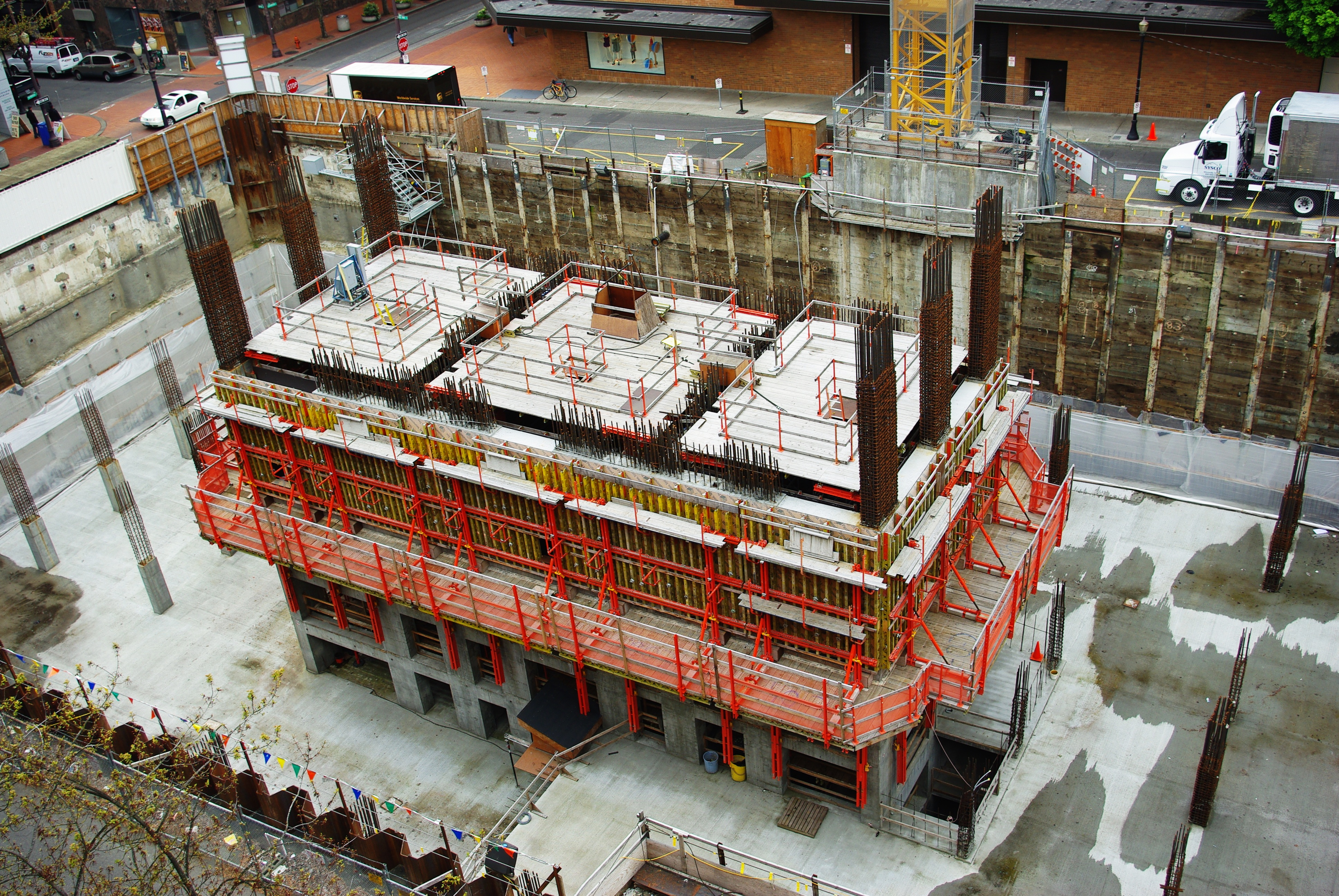
Construction site, May 2010

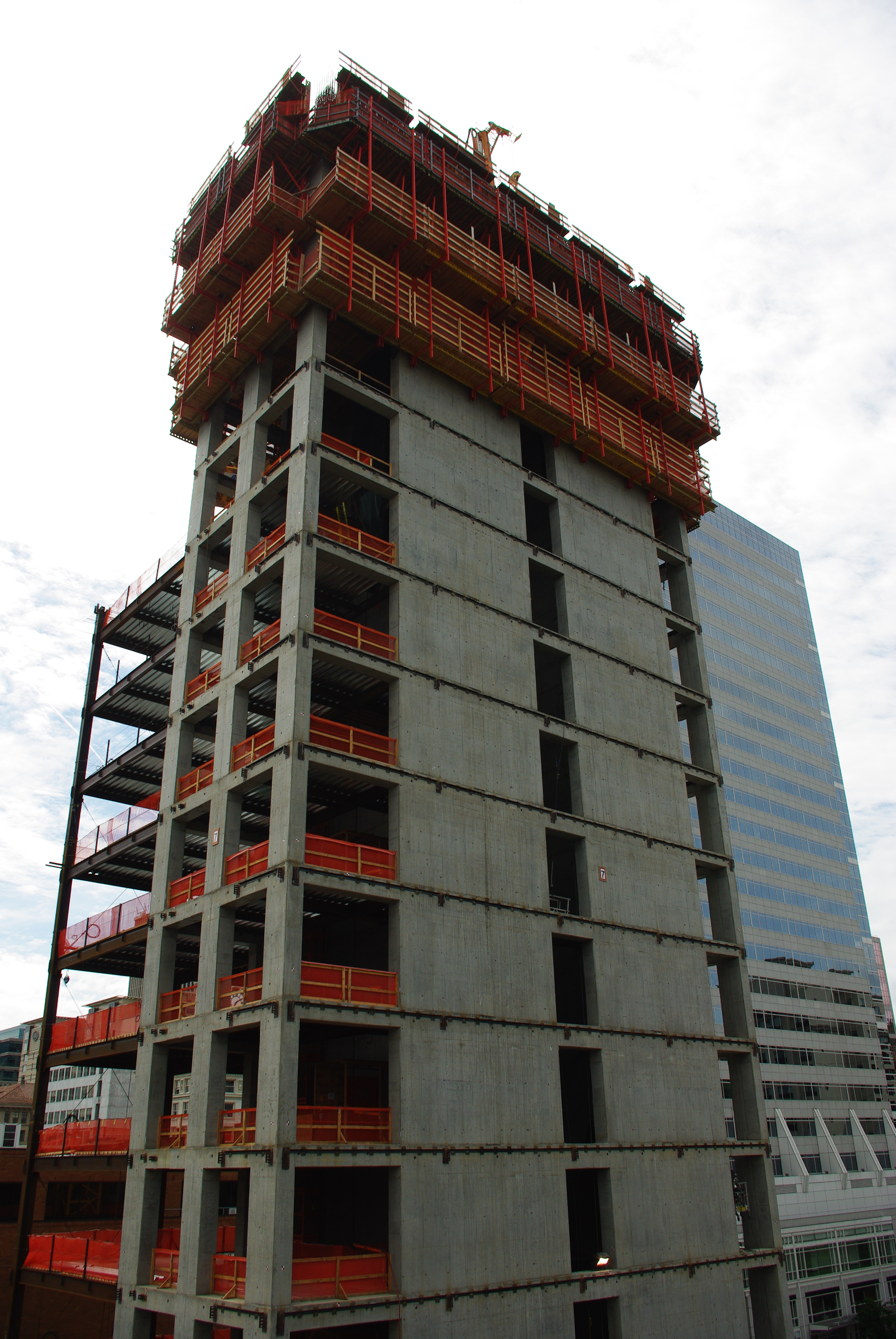
Construction, May 2014

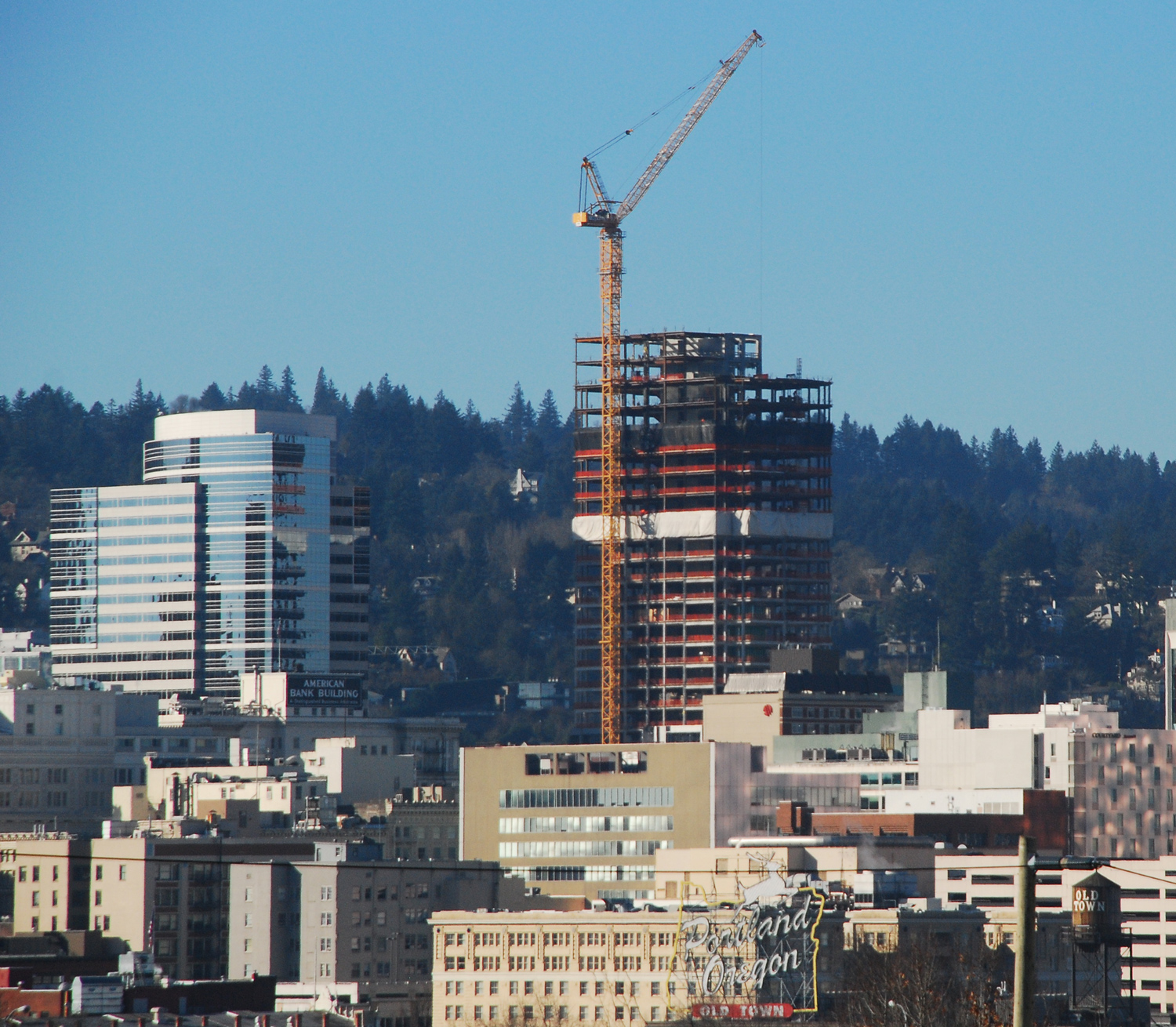
Construction, January 2015

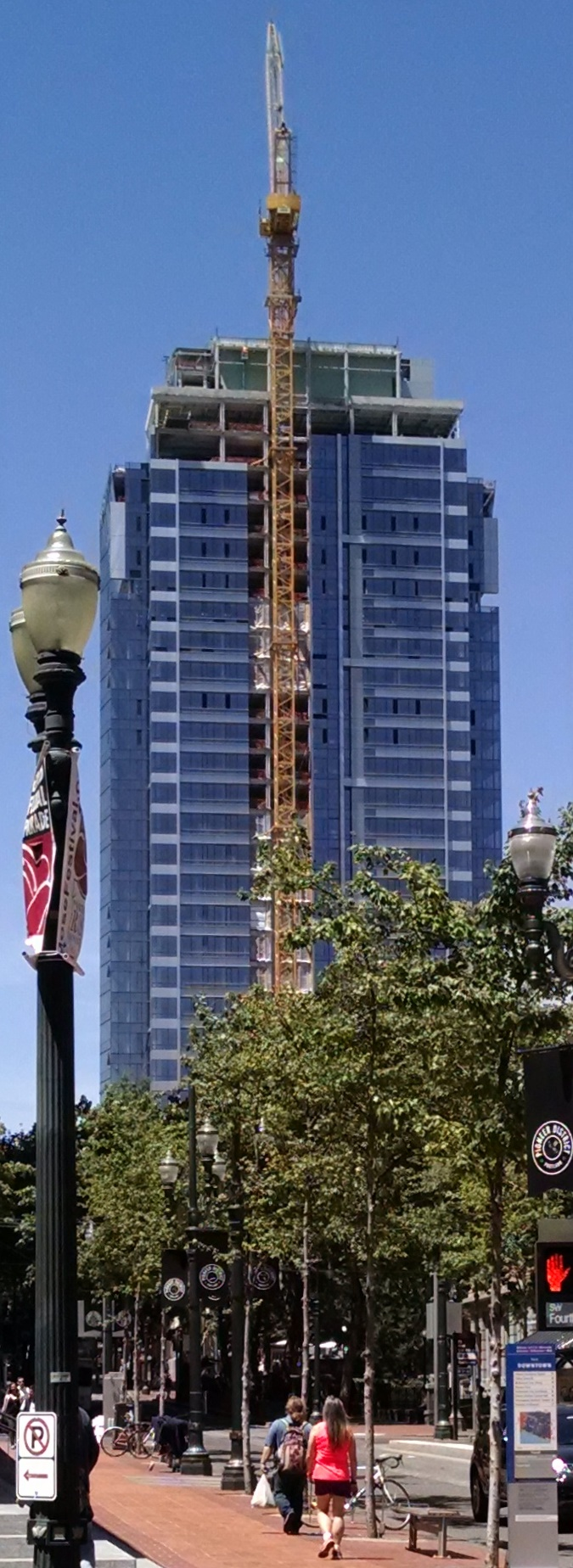
Construction, June 2015

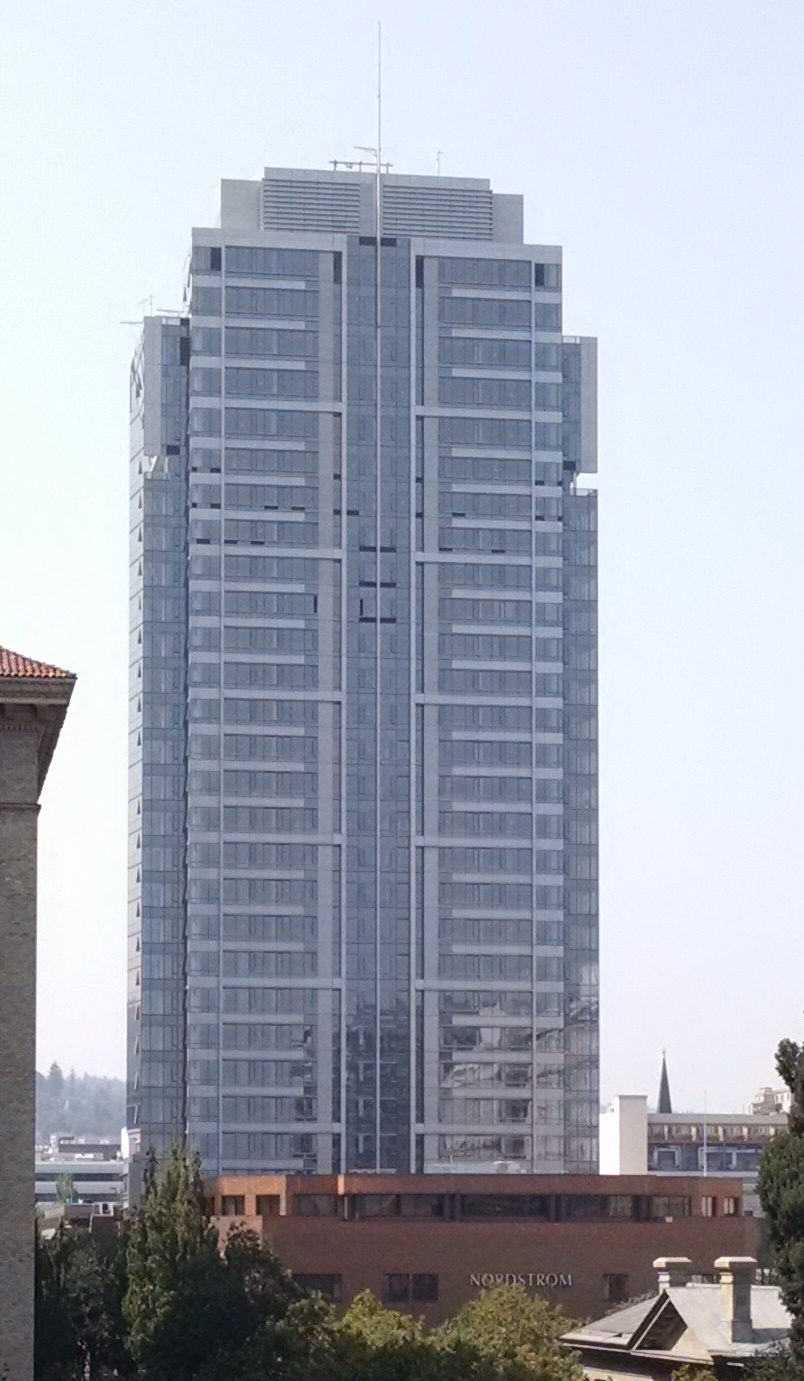
The near-complete tower, August 2015

== See also ==
- Architecture in Portland, Oregon
- List of tallest buildings in Portland, Oregon
