= Fox Tower =

Skyscraper in Portland, Oregon, U.S.

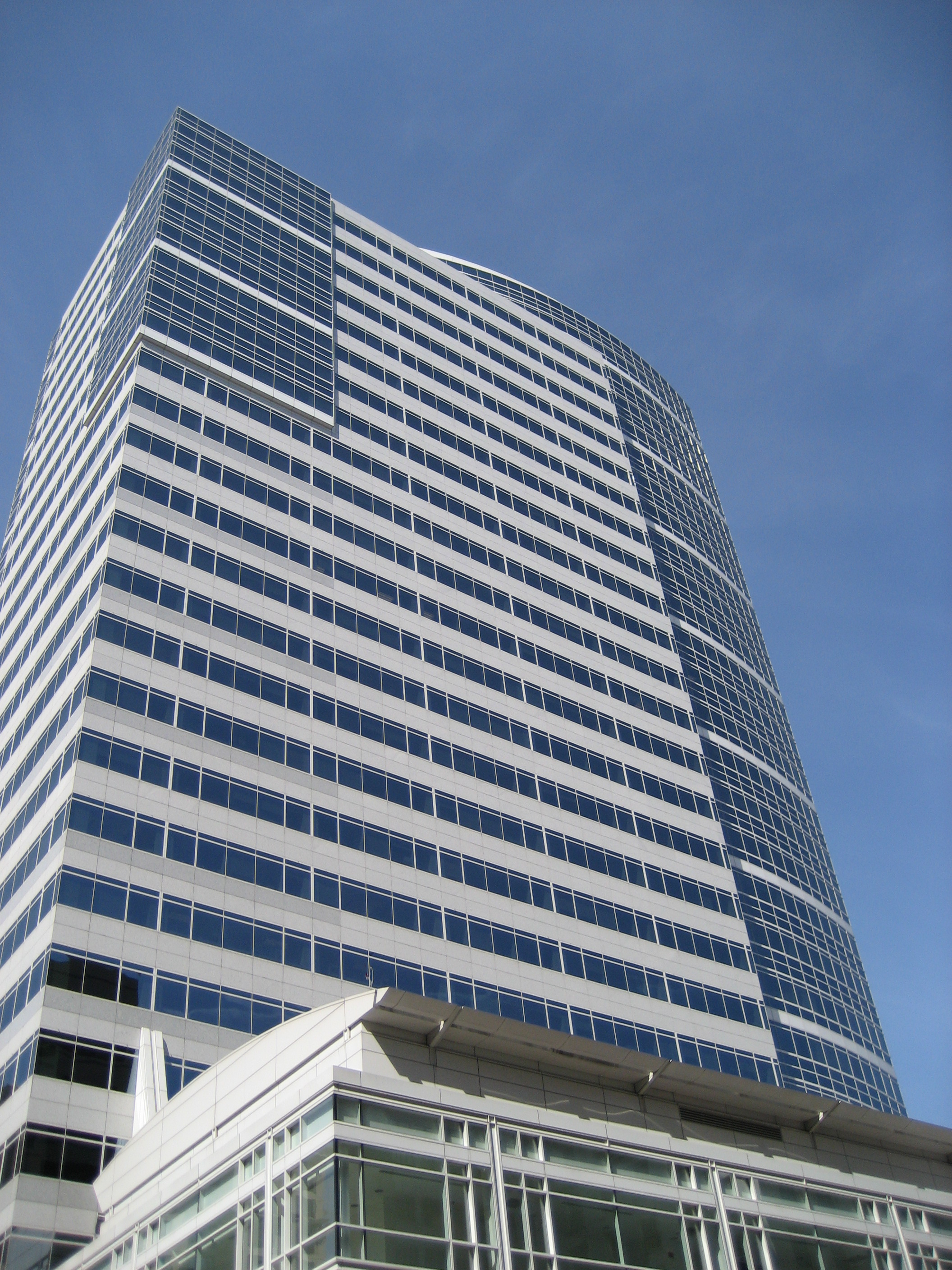

- Location within Portland, Oregon

General information
- Type: Commercial offices
- Location: 805 SW Broadway; Portland, Oregon
- Coordinates: 45.5183°N 122.6809°W
- Completed: 2000
- Cost: US$64 million
- Owner: TMT Development
- Management: TMT Development

Height
- Roof: 113.39 m (372.0 ft)

Technical details
- Floor count: 27
- Floor area: 599,388 sq ft (55,685.0 m^{2})

Design and construction
- Architect: TVA Architects
- Developer: TMT Development
- Main contractor: Hoffman Construction

The Fox Tower is a 27-story, 113.39 m (372.0 ft) office skyscraper in downtown Portland, Oregon, along Broadway between Yamhill and Taylor streets. The tower was completed in 2000 at a cost of $64 million, and was named after the Fox Theatre that occupied the site from 1911 until the late 1990s. TVA Architects designed the building and Tom Moyer developed the property.

== History ==
Original designs for the tower included seven floors of above-ground parking. Plans for the above-ground parking levels were removed in 1998 to add space for what was originally to be a movie theater operated by Act III Theaters. The building earned Gold Leadership in Energy and Environmental Design (LEED) certification from the U.S. Green Building Council in 2012 for its sustainability.

== Details ==
The building is most notable for the contrast between its curving east side and boxy west side. The juxtaposition of the building's angles create a unique profile from each side. This multiplanar and set-back design is meant to prevent as much of the building's shadow as possible from falling upon Pioneer Courthouse Square on the opposite corner.

The ground floor houses retail stores, and Regal's Fox Tower 10 movie theater is located on the second floor. The 462-space underground parking garage was the deepest in Portland when built. In 2006 the Fox Tower's developer, Tom Moyer, started construction of an underground garage on the block to the west, connected to the Fox Tower garage. This new parking structure opened in December 2007 making the total underground parking space count 1132. Because the west block lies slightly uphill from the Fox Tower, the west garage is deeper than the Fox Tower garage, relative to ground level. The new garage is an underground facility, with a City of Portland park on top of the garage. Construction and landscaping for the park was started by the City of Portland in March 2008. The underground parking is also planned to be connected to the Park Avenue West Tower.

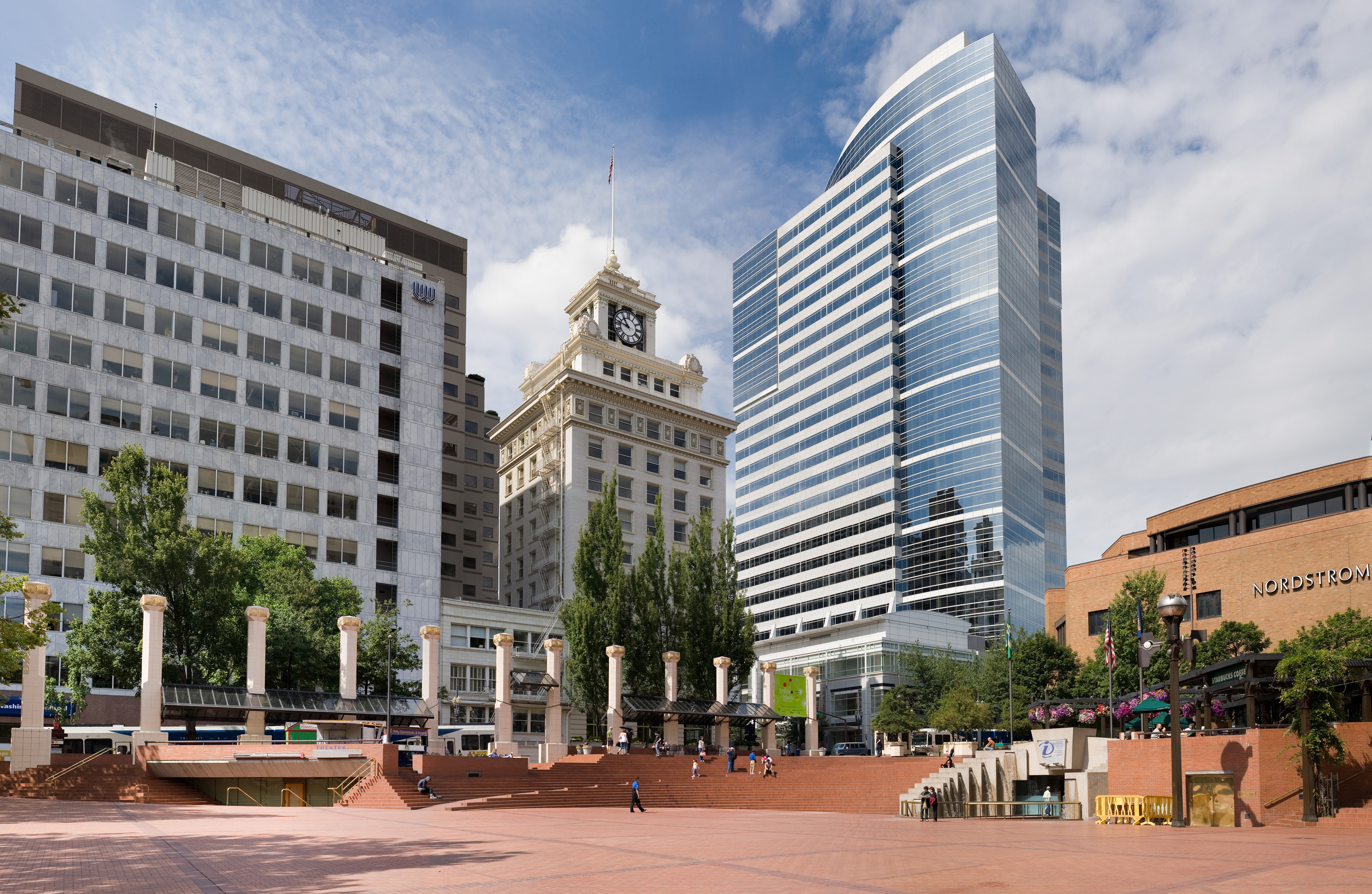
The Fox Tower (right) viewed from Pioneer Courthouse Square

== See also ==
- Architecture of Portland, Oregon
- Fox Theatre (Portland, Oregon)
- List of tallest buildings in Portland, Oregon
- RingSide Fish House
- RingSide Steakhouse
