= 1000 Broadway =

Office building in Portland, Oregon, U.S.

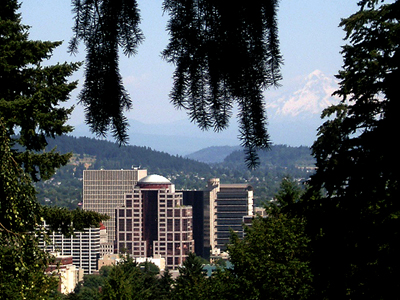
- View of 1000 Broadway from the West Hills with Mount Hood rising above downtown Portland

- Location within Portland, Oregon

General information
- Type: Commercial offices
- Location: Portland, Oregon
- Coordinates: 45.5167°N 122.6809°W
- Completed: 1991
- Cost: US$90 million

Height
- Roof: 88 m (289 ft)

Technical details
- Floor count: 24

Design and construction
- Architect: Broome, Oringdulph, O, Toole, Rudolph, and Associates

1000 Broadway is a 24-story office building in Portland, Oregon. The distinguishing feature of the building is a series of rings that form a dome over the center portion of its roof. Because of this, the building is nicknamed "The Ban Roll-on Building".

The architectural firm of Broome, Oringdulph, O'Toole, Rudolph, and Associates designed the building. It was also Portland developer Tom Moyer's first major project. It reportedly cost US$90 million to build the tower. 1000 Broadway opened to the public in 1991.

The half-block lot formerly hosted the Broadway Theater, an art deco movie house. Plans to restore and include the old marquee never came to fruition. However, a 4-screen multi-plex movie theater was built inside the new tower. Originally the new theater was operated by Act III Theaters, which had been formed from the chain started by Moyer. The 1000 Broadway theater, along with all Act III theaters, was later acquired by Regal Cinemas in 1998, which in turn closed the 1000 Broadway four-plex in September 2011.

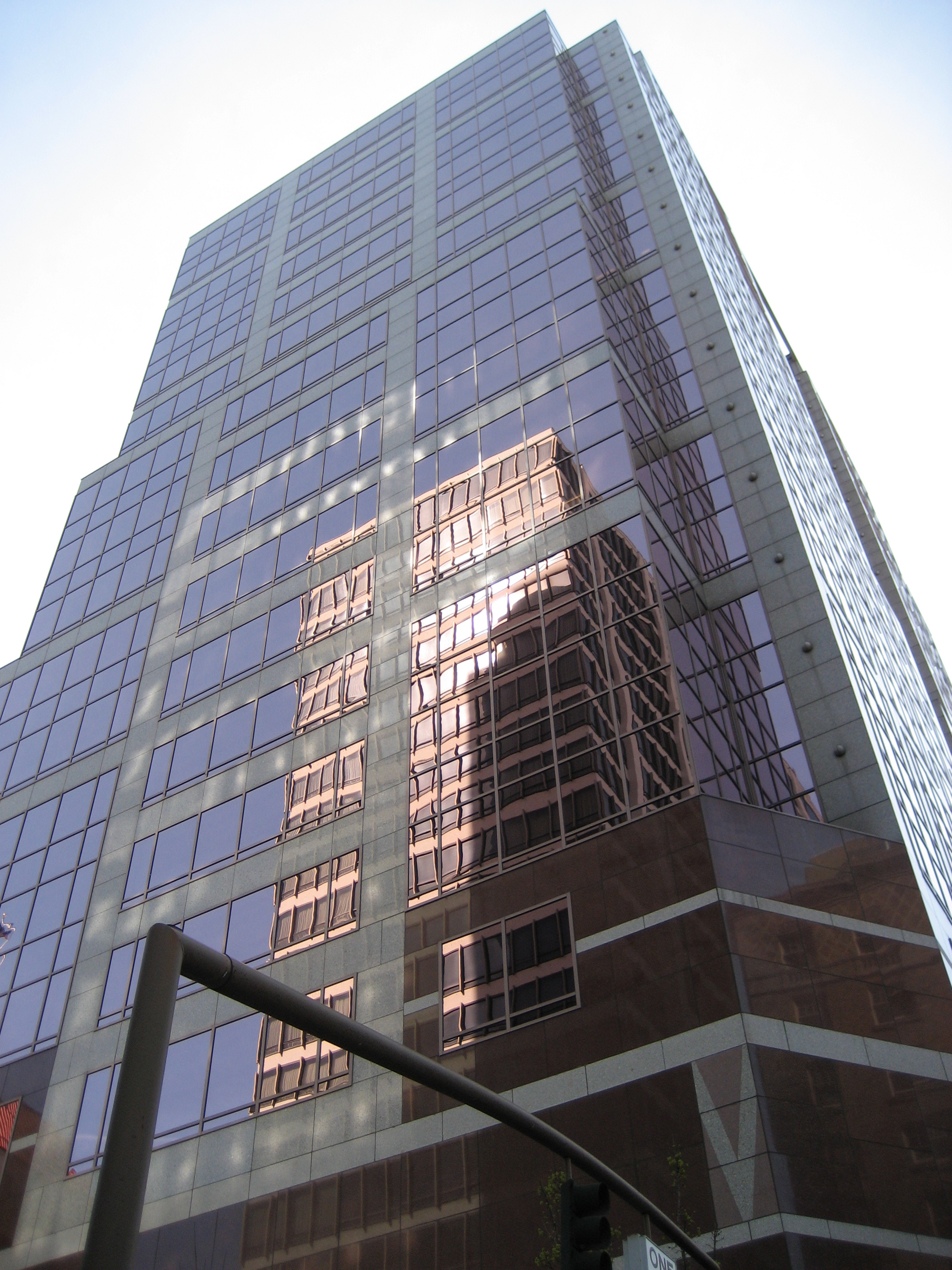
Street view

== See also ==
- Architecture of Portland, Oregon
- List of tallest buildings in Portland, Oregon
