= Director Park =

Public park in Portland, Oregon, U.S.

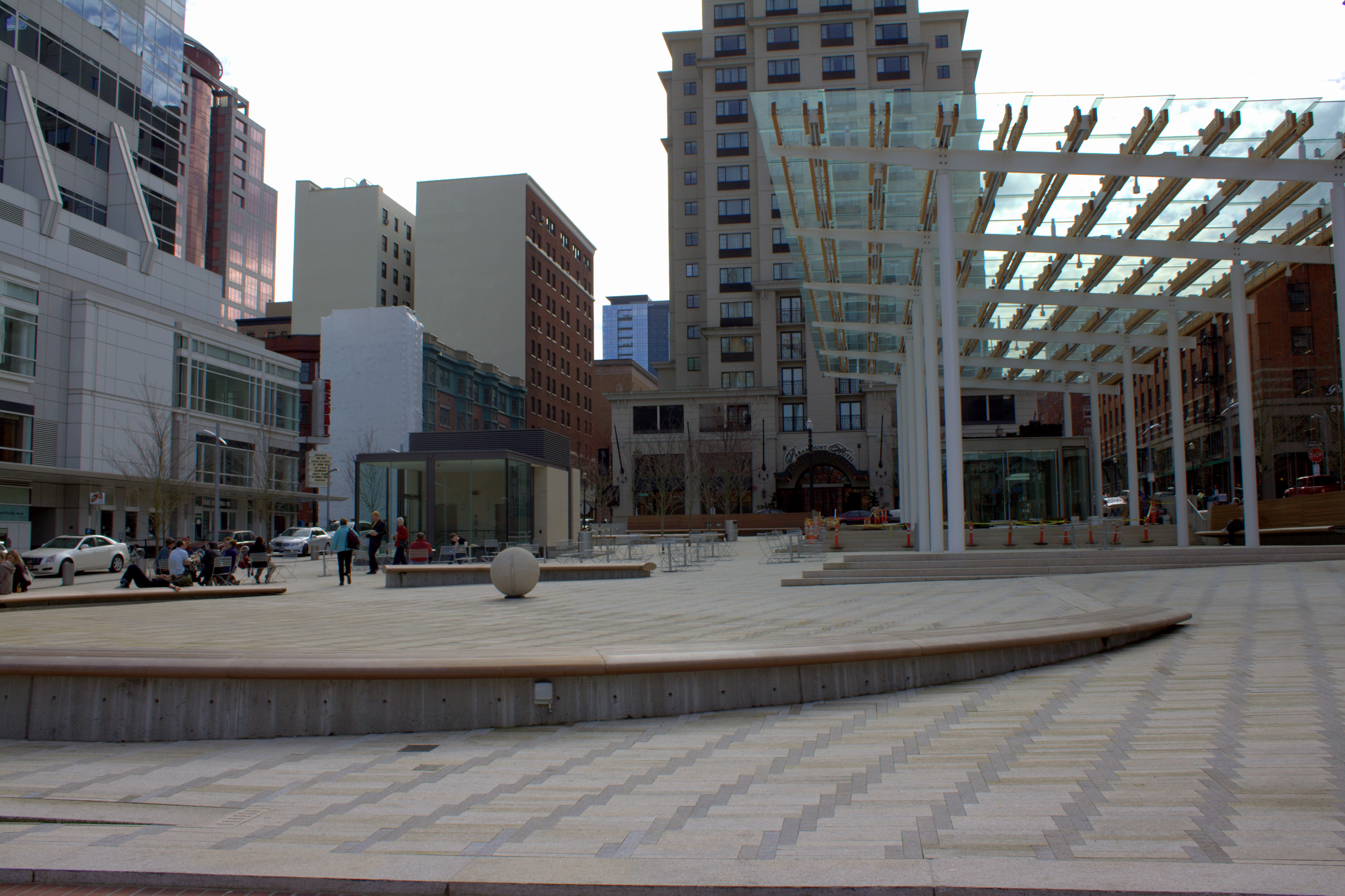
- The park in February 2010; Fox Tower is on left

- Location within Portland, Oregon
- Type: Urban park
- Location: 815 SW Park Ave. Portland, Oregon
- Coordinates: 45.518624°N 122.681389°W
- Area: 0.71 acres (0.29 ha)
- Created: 2009
- Operator: Portland Parks & Recreation
- Open: 5 a.m. to 11 p.m. daily
- Parking: 700-space underground parking garage
- Public transit: Library/SW 9th Ave and Galleria/SW 10th Ave

Director Park (officially Simon and Helen Director Park) is a city park in Portland in the U.S. state of Oregon. Opened in 2009 at a cost of $9.5 million, it covers a 700-space underground parking garage, which connects underground to the Fox Tower and the Park Avenue West Tower. Located in downtown on Southwest Park Avenue, the nearly half-acre urban park lacks any natural areas and contains little vegetation.

Features at the park include a fountain, artworks, a cafe, and a distinctive glass canopy. Director Park was designed by Laurie Olin of the design firm OLIN, and the Portland-based architectural firm ZGF Architects. The park is part of what had originally been planned as a corridor of consecutive public parks stretching across downtown Portland. This plan included what are today the South Park Blocks and the North Park Blocks. Proposals to connect the two sets of park blocks arose in the 1970s, and in 1998 businessman Tom Moyer made a proposal for what became Director Park. Planning began in the mid-2000s, and construction began in 2008.

== Design ==
The park is paved in light granite and includes a 1,000 square feet (93 m^{2}) glass canopy with space for a cafe, meeting Moyer's requirement that 30% of the space be devoted to commercial activity. It is curbless on 9th Avenue and 10th Avenue, allowing pedestrians to take a greater priority, and for the avenues to be closed for larger events.

In 2011, Director Park was one of five finalists for the Urban Land Institute's Amanda Burden Urban Open Space Award. The award is meant to "[recognize] an outstanding example of a public open space that has enriched and revitalized its surrounding community." The other four finalists were Portland's Jamison Square, Houston's Discovery Green and Raymond and Susan Brochstein Pavilion, and St. Louis' Citygarden, the last of which ultimately won the prize on May 19, 2011.

The wood beams under the glass canopy were determined to be defective in 2014, and a plan was made to replace them in September 2015 with steel beams. ZGF agreed to pay $602,000 to replace the wood beams, with the city paying an additional $188,000 to upgrade to steel beams.

== History ==
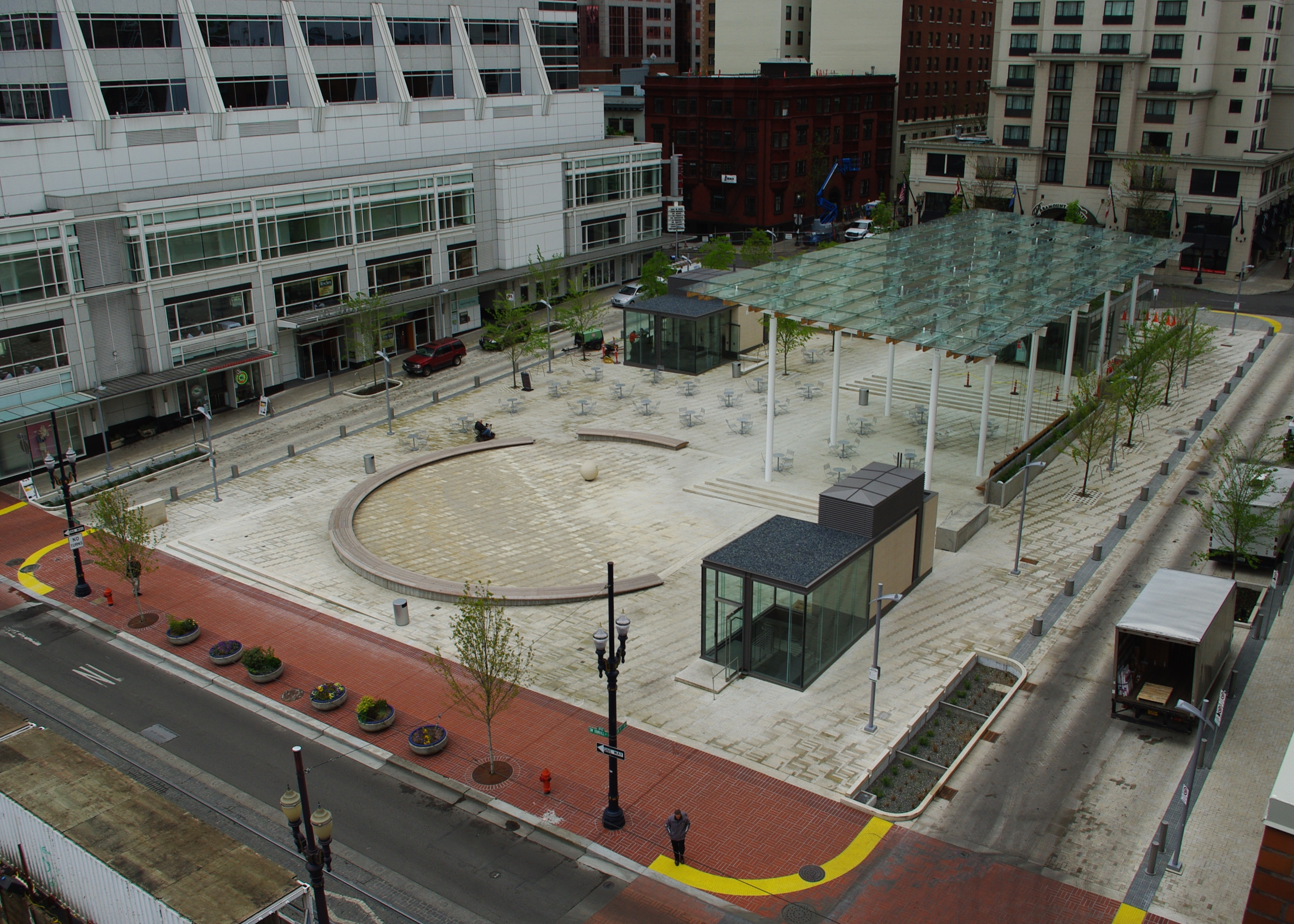
View of entire park from above

Daniel H. Lownsdale reserved the Park Blocks for public use in his 1848 platting of Portland, but didn't actually donate land to the city. As historian E. Kimbark MacColl stated, "By no stretch of the imagination could he be cited as a 'philanthropist.' He was greedy like most of his partners.... The record is clear: Daniel Lownsdale was a visionary but shifty character whose land speculation helped to spawn more litigation in Portland than in any other western city of comparable size." Chet Orloff wrote an editorial in 2001 stating "six crucial blocks were lost to greed, government reluctance, poor estate planning and an adverse court decision." The park land was previously used for surface parking, and contained an early "food cart institution", the Snow White House crêperie.

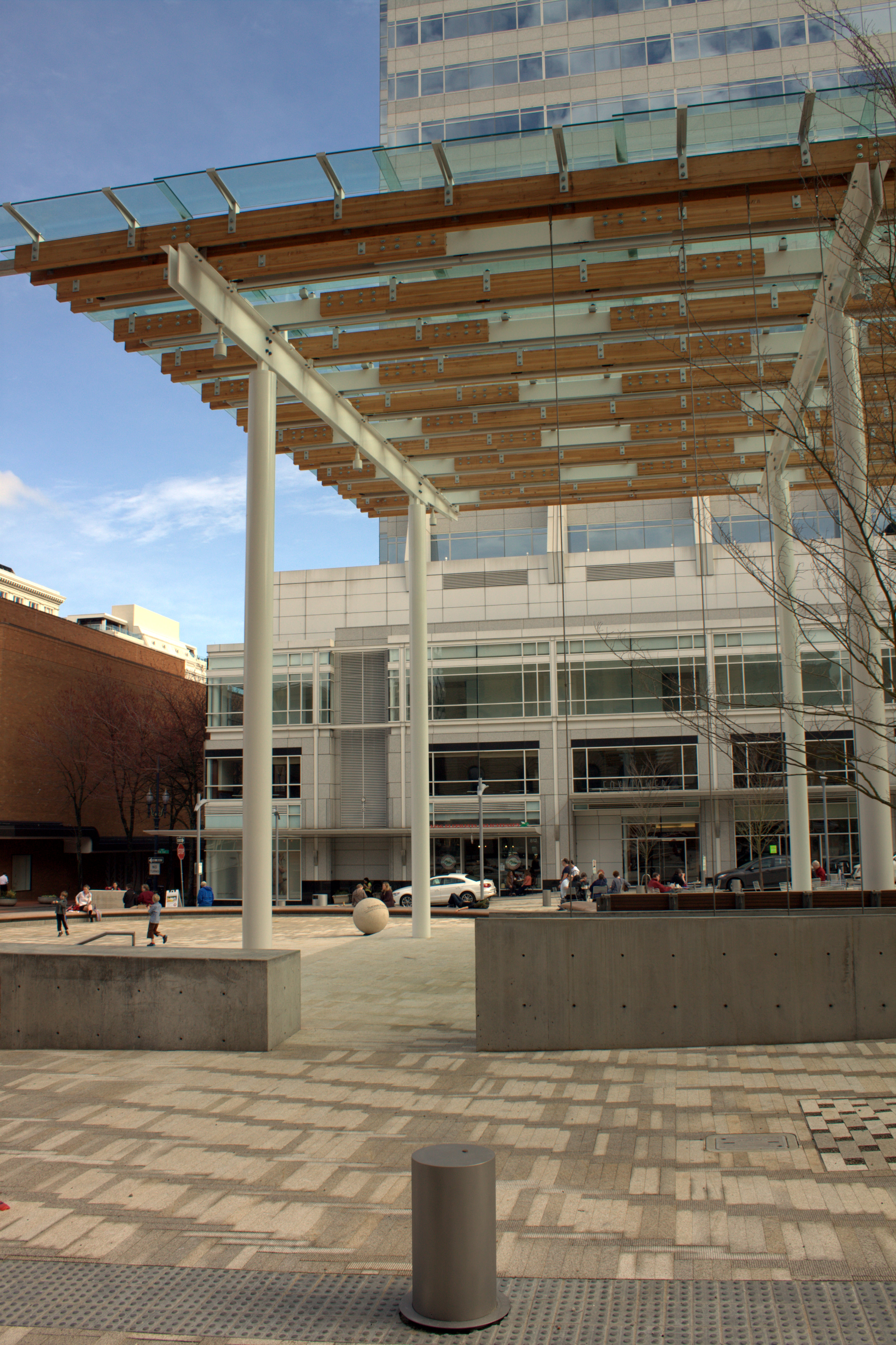
Glass canopy, with Fox Tower in background

Developer Tom Moyer wanted to redevelop the block since the 1970s. The City Club of Portland held a significant meeting in 1992 about the fate of the Central Park Blocks, also called the Commercial Park Blocks. Moyer and the PDC opposed "the downtown parking magnate" Greg Goodman's plans to turn the block into a 550-space 12-story parking structure in 1995, which was to be called the Park Avenue Plaza. Neil Goldschmidt said the parking structure would be "like putting lipstick on a dead corpse" and Bill Naito said that a "12-story garage won't go away. This is a chance to do something special. We should try to do something special every decade."

Moyer proposed the park in February 1998, in a move later described as Moyer's "march to reunite" the North and South Park Blocks. Both the Portland Development Commission and the Portland Parks Foundation (Moyer, Goldschmidt) were in favor of Portland Planning Director Gil Kelley's 2001 recommendation for the area, which favored a new midtown Park Block as well as "thematically consistent development" along the blocks. The foundation raised $500,000 from 20 patrons, and had an agreement from building owner Joe Weston to donate a building to make way for the park blocks.

Others, including the Portland chapter of American Institute of Architects, Vera Katz, Laurie Olin, and Michael Powell (of Powell's Books) were against the plan, with Powell saying "I was sort of under the impression that people came downtown to work and shop, not to gain a rural experience". By 2004, the idea to reunite the Park Blocks through midtown was dead, due to Neil Goldschmidt moving out of the spotlight during his sex abuse scandal, Vera Katz's disapproval of the plan, and because Moyer was "tired of swimming upstream" against the city council.

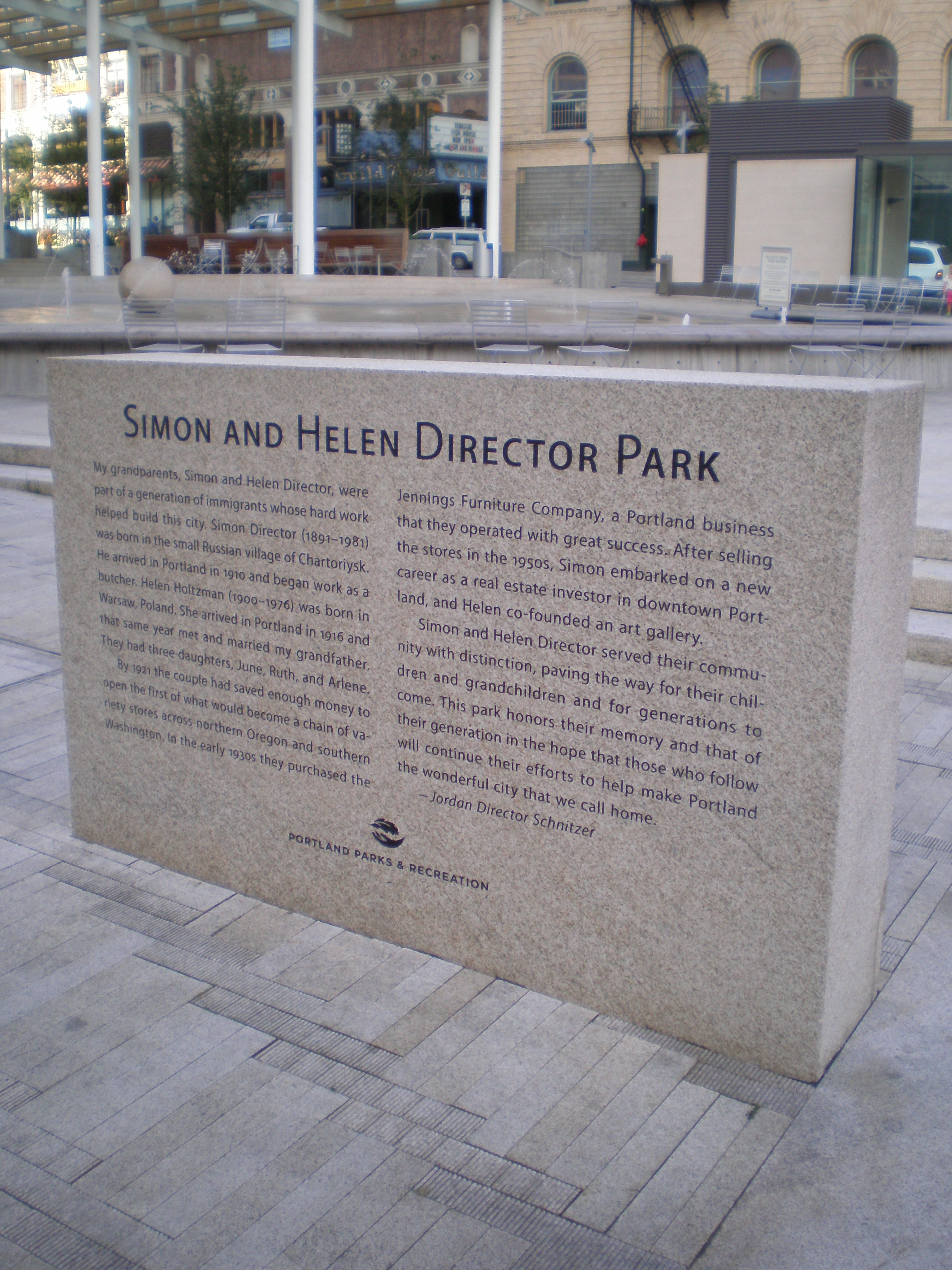
Park signage (2011)

The park was originally titled South Park Block 5. It was designed by Laurie Olin and ZGF Architects. Olin also designed Bryant Park in New York, as well as the redesigns of Pershing Square in Los Angeles and Columbus Circle in New York. ZGF and Olin had competed against the team of Robert Murase, SERA Architects, and Christian Moeller. The budget in 2006 was $2.1 million, which included renovations to O'Bryant Square and Ankeny Park (which have not been renovated, as of 2010). Developer Tom Moyer had previously donated $1 million and asked the park be named Marilyn Moyer Park, after his deceased wife. Moyer also donated the surface space for the park, using the space underground for 700 spaces of additional parking, connecting the parking of Moyer's Fox Tower and Park Avenue West Tower.

During a time of budget shortfalls, the city, the public steering committee (headed by Chet Orloff), and Tom Moyer were willing to give away naming rights in exchange for further funding. Jordan Schnitzer, a local developer, donated $1.97 million for the plaza and asked city commissioners to name it for his maternal grandparents, Simon and Helen Director. Simon was born in Russia, Helen was born in Poland, and they met in Portland in 1916. Since plans for reconnecting the midtown Park Blocks had been squelched due to Moyer's announcement of Park Avenue West Tower, which "drove a stake through its heart", the Park Blocks Foundation, started by Goldschmidt and Moyer but headed by Jim Westwood by 2007, suspended conversations to donating Park Blocks Foundation cash to build the surface of Park Block 5.

With Schnitzer's funding, the budget increased to $5.5 million when construction began in May 2008. The park, originally expected to be completed by late 2008, was dedicated on October 27, 2009, with a performance by BodyVox. The total cost was nearly $9.5 million, with $4.5 million from the Portland Development Commission, $1.9 million from the City of Portland, and $2.9 million in private donations, mainly from Schnitzer and Moyer. In June 2015, it was announced that the park needed $790,000 in repairs to replace the wooden beams in the glass canopy with steel beams.

=== Operations ===
The cafe Violetta was run by local restaurateur Dwayne Beliakoff. Elephant's in the Park, a branch of the local chain Elephants Delicatessen, replaced Violetta as the cafe tenant early in 2012. As of 2015, Elephants pays $23,292 in rent per year. The park will cost an estimated $475,000 to run per year.

== See also ==
- List of parks in Portland, Oregon
