= Hoffman Construction Company =

Privately held construction company

Coordinates: 45.518083°N 122.680318°W

- Type: Private
- Industry: Heavy construction; Engineering; Project management
- Founded: 1922
- Founder: Lee Hawley Hoffman
- Headquarters: 805 SW Broadway, Suite 2100, Portland, Oregon, U.S.
- Area served: Pacific Northwest
- Key people: David Drinkward, President, CEO
- Products: Construction contracting
- Revenue: US$5.69billion (2023)
- Number of employees: 1,200 (2023)
- Website: www.hoffmancorp.com

Hoffman Construction Company is an American privately held construction and general contracting company founded in 1922 and headquartered in Portland, Oregon.

Established by Lee Hawley Hoffman, the company specializes in commercial, industrial, institutional, and infrastructure construction, providing construction management, engineering, and general contracting services.

== History ==
Lee Hoffman (May 15, 1850 – August 8, 1959) moved to Portland in the 1870s with his family and worked constructing bridges and other projects, including the Bull Run pipeline.

The company started out building primarily apartment buildings and industrial structures in Portland. It had grown to more than 400 employees by 1928.

Hoffman expanded to Seattle in 1929. The firm also built Cushman Dam No. 2 that year near Shelton, Washington, for Tacoma Power and Light.

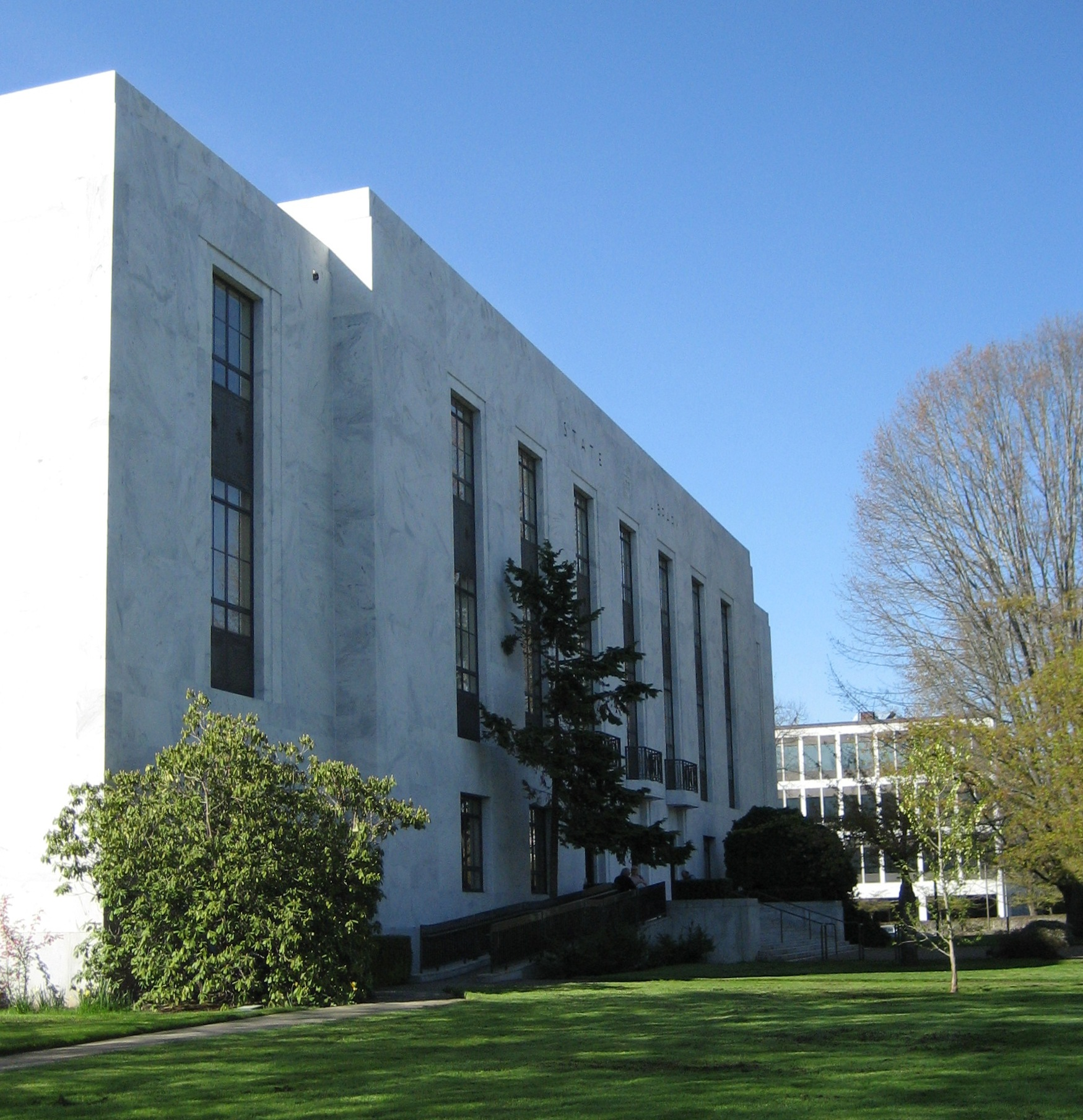
Oregon State Library in Salem

Eric Hoffman (1923–2016) became president of the company in 1956 and chair in 1974. Lee Hawley Hoffman died on August 8, 1959. Cecil Drinkward came to Hoffman in 1967 as a vice president, and his son Wayne joined in 1985. Cecil Drinkward became president in 1974. In the late 1960s, the company shifted emphasis from paper and forestry industry to commercial construction.

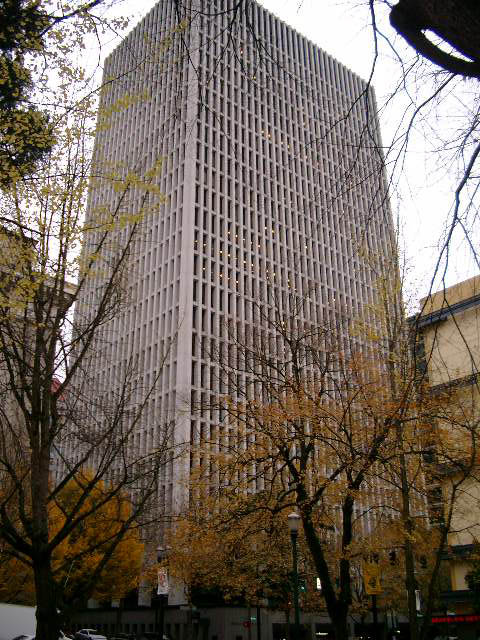
Standard Insurance Center in Portland, Oregon

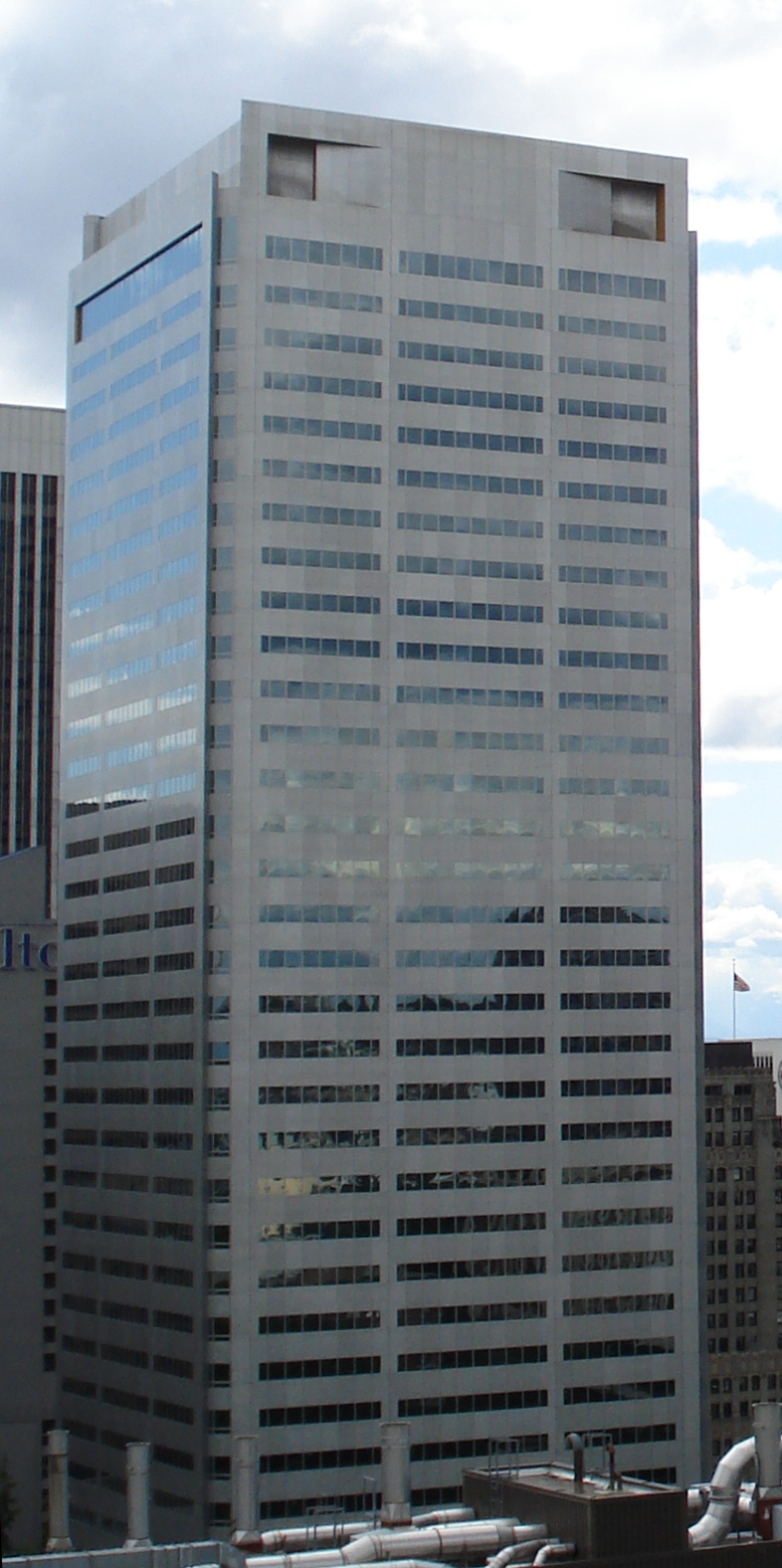
One Union Square in Seattle, Washington

After Hoffman completed an expansion at the Snake River Correctional Institute in Eastern Oregon, the state audited the work on the project in 1999. Auditors alleged some overpayments, while the company and the Oregon Department of Corrections disputed those allegations.

The Intel D1X project built by Hoffman was named as the largest construction project in Oregon history in 2017. Intel hired Hoffman for this project in 2010. The newspaper reports "several billion dollars" but the exact amount is a "closely guarded secret". In 2015, Hoffman filed a $50.8 million lien on the D1X. In December 2017, The Oregonian followed up to report that Hoffman had withdrawn the "mysterious $50 million lien". Intel said "The terms and conditions of the resolution are confidential,"

Hoffman moved into the Fox Tower in downtown Portland in 2000 after constructing the building and added a permanent lobby exhibit showcasing the company's history. The company is re-locating to Lake Oswego in 2025.

Hoffman Construction was issued a warning by the City of Portland in September 2020 for having utilized a subcontractor that obtained women-owned status fraudulently so they can be awarded jobs as a subcontractor on Portland city government projects under a program designed to help disadvantaged business. This came after the subcontractor under question was caught.

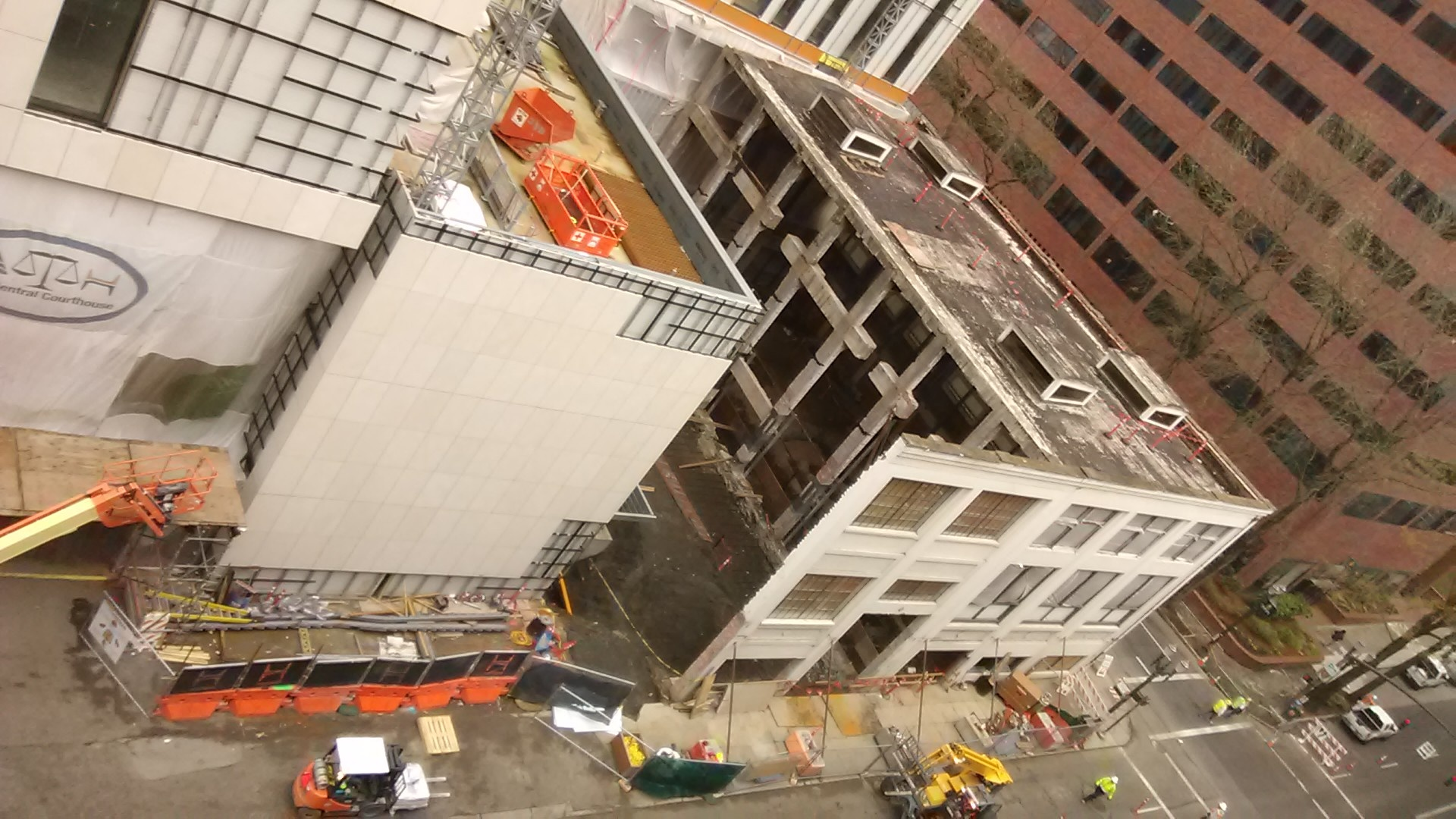
Multnomah County's New Courthouse in progress. (April 2019)

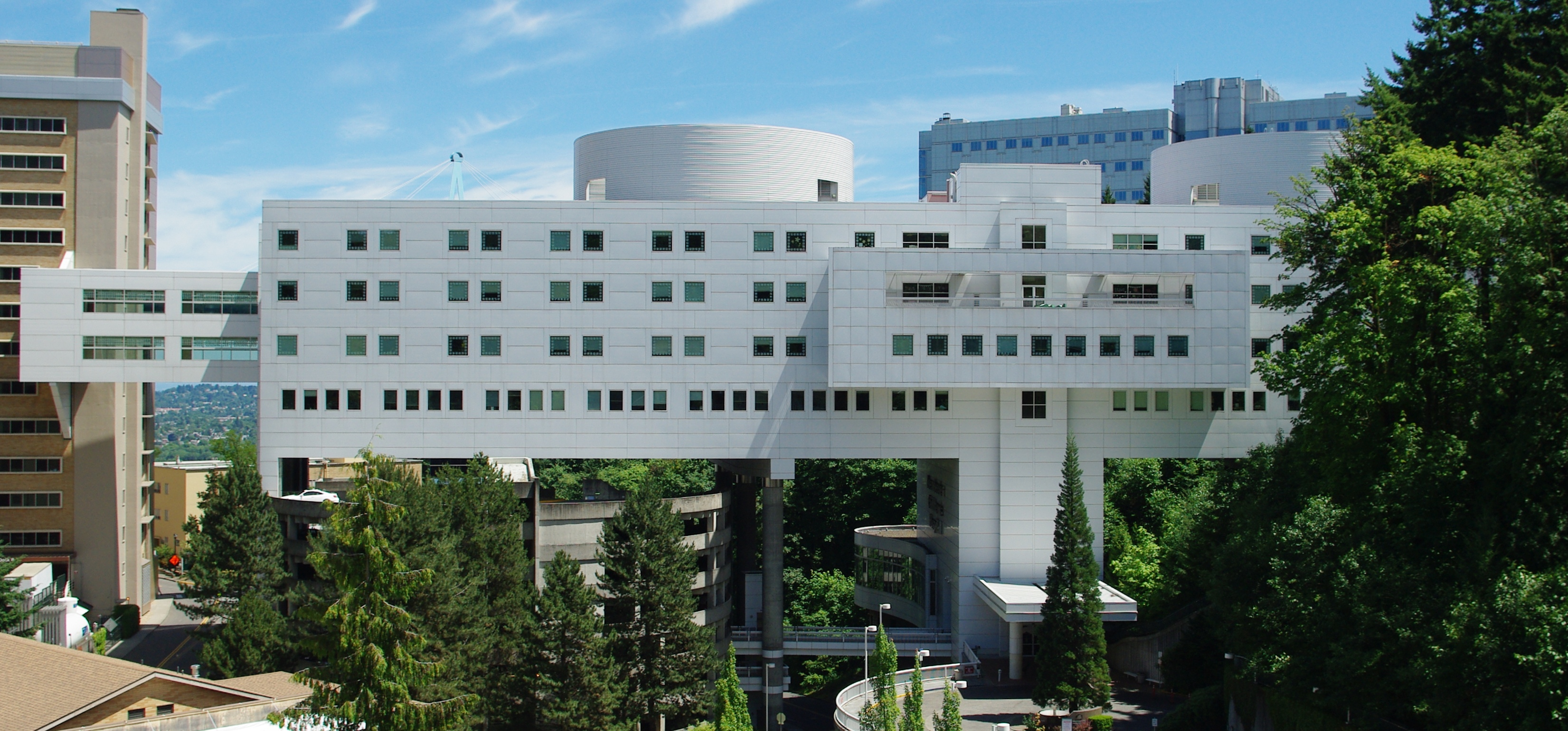
Doernbecher Children's Hospital in Portland

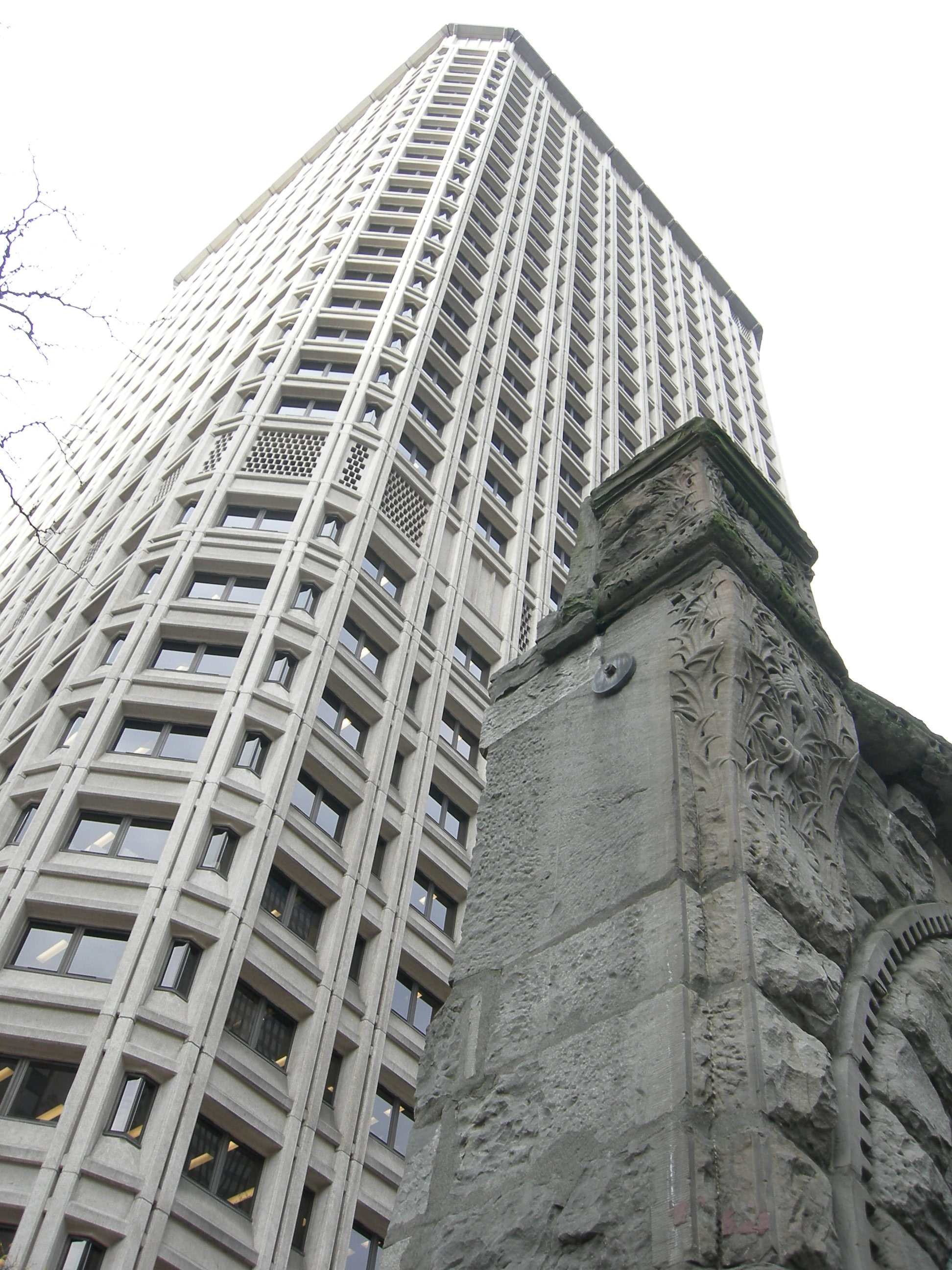
Henry M. Jackson Federal Building in Seattle

Hoffman is known for building the Fox Tower, Memorial Coliseum, the Oregon Convention Center and the Wells Fargo Center.

== Footnotes ==
- Beckham, Stephen Dow (1995). Hoffman Construction Company: 75 Years of Building. Hoffman Corporation. ISBN 0-930998-08-1.
