= Stearns House =

Stearns House may refer to:

- Stearns House (Denver, Colorado), listed on the National Register of Historic Places (NRHP) in Colorado
- Samuel Stearns House, part of the Broad Street Historic District (Middletown, Connecticut)
- Stearns–Wadsworth House, Blackberry Township, Illinois, listed on the NRHP
- R. H. Stearns Building, Boston, Massachusetts, listed on the NRHP
- Amos Stearns House, Waltham, Massachusetts, listed on the NRHP
- Dunbar–Stearns House, Waltham, Massachusetts, listed on the NRHP in Massachusetts
- Frederick K. Stearns House, Detroit, Michigan, listed on the NRHP
- Stearns House, the original building of St. Cloud State University, St. Cloud, Minnesota
- Edward R. Stearns House, Wyoming, Ohio, listed on the NRHP
- William Stearns House, Wyoming, Ohio, listed on the NRHP
- Roome–Stearns House, Portland, Oregon, listed on the NRHP in Oregon
