= F. E. Bowman Apartments =

Historic building in Portland, Oregon, U.S.

- U.S. National Register of Historic Places
- U.S. Historic district – Contributing property
- Portland Historic Landmark
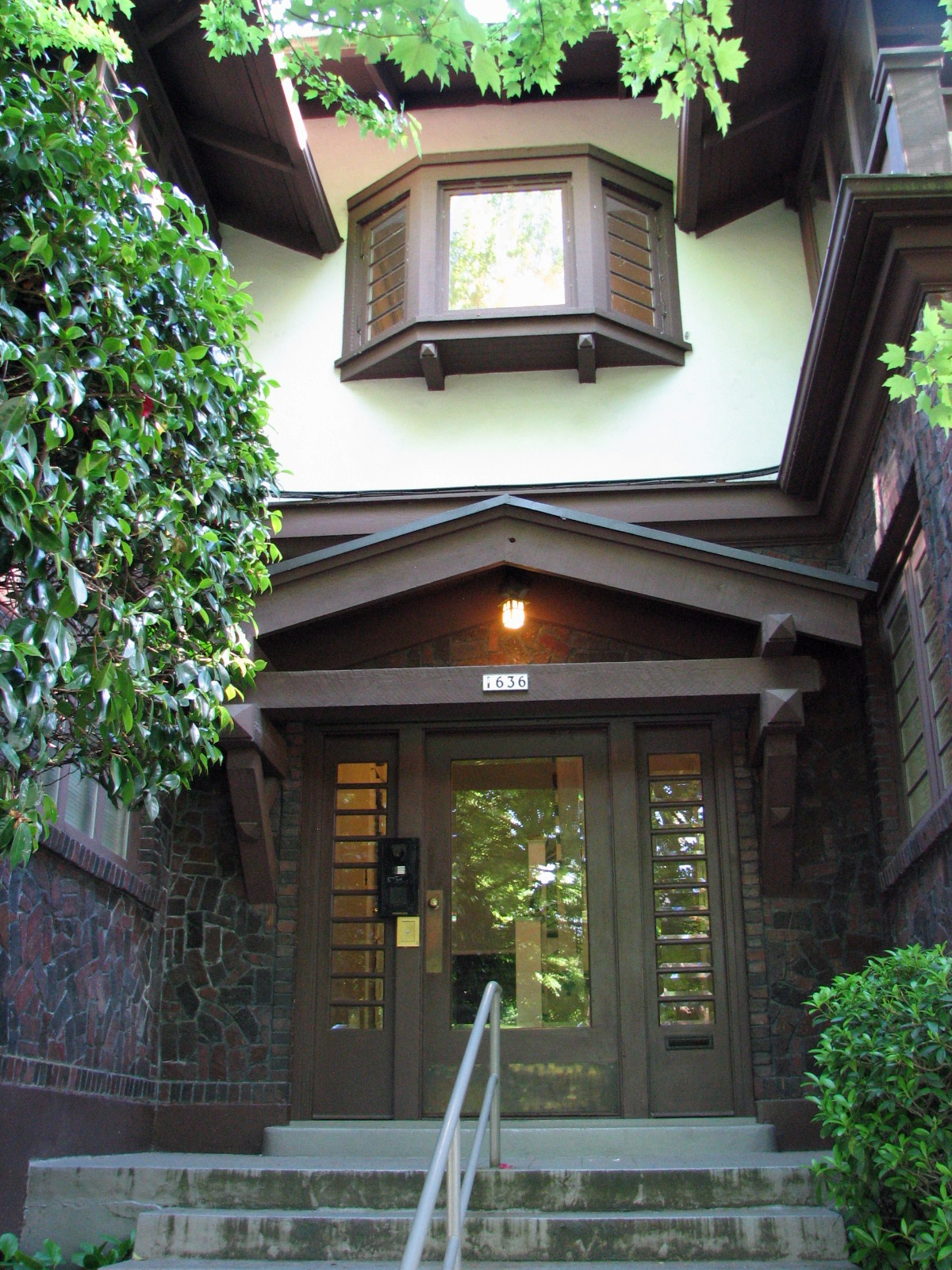
- The Bowman Apartments in 2008
- Location: 1624–1636 NE Tillamook Street; Portland, Oregon
- Coordinates: 45°32′14″N 122°38′55″W
- Built: 1913
- Built by: Frederic E. Bowman
- Architectural style: Craftsman, with Prairie School influences
- Part of: Irvington Historic District (ID10000850)
- NRHP reference No.: 89000511
- Added to NRHP: June 16, 1989

The F. E. Bowman Apartments is a historic apartment building located in the Irvington neighborhood of Portland, Oregon, United States. Constructed in 1913, it is one of the oldest apartment buildings in Irvington, and the best preserved from its era. Through its Craftsman styling, builder Frederic E. Bowman gave attention to blending the building into the neighborhood of pre-existing single-family homes. It is one of several apartment buildings of similar scale and/or style that Bowman added to Portland's urban landscape through his career.

The building was placed on the National Register of Historic Places in 1989.

== See also ==
- National Register of Historic Places listings in Northeast Portland, Oregon
- Irvington Bowman Apartments
