= Alfred C. and Nettie Ruby House =

Historic house in Oregon, United States

- U.S. National Register of Historic Places
- U.S. Historic district – Contributing property
- Portland Historic Landmark
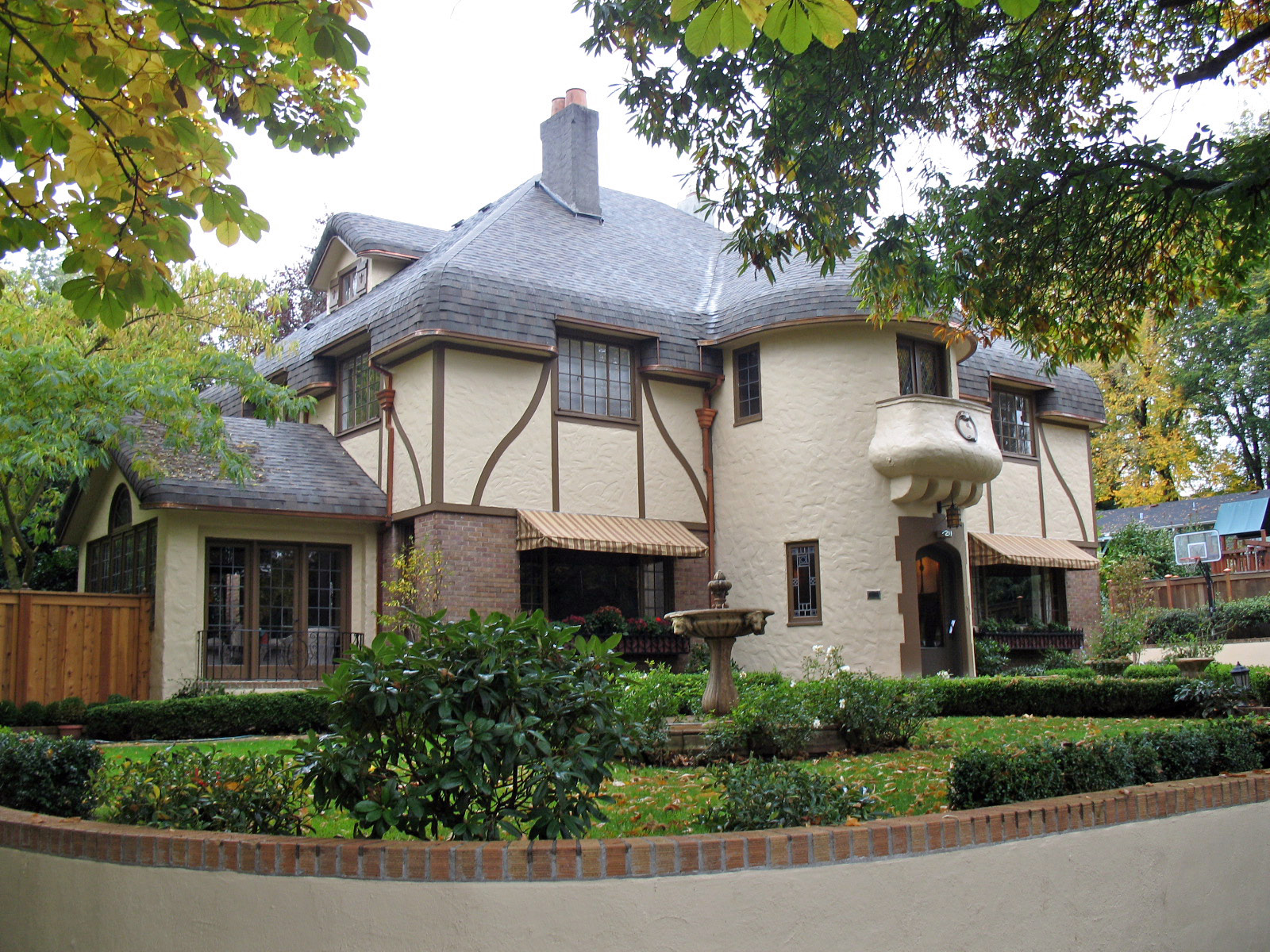
- The house in 2009

- Location within the United States Location within Oregon Location within Portland, Oregon
- Location: 211 NE César E. Chávez Boulevard; Portland, Oregon
- Coordinates: 45°31′31″N 122°37′24″W
- Built: 1926–1927
- Architect: Walter E. Kelly
- Architectural style: Tudor Revival
- Part of: Laurelhurst Historic District (ID100003462)
- NRHP reference No.: 05001559
- Added to NRHP: January 26, 2006

The Alfred C. and Nettie Ruby House is a historic residence in Portland, Oregon, United States. Built in 1926–1927, it is an exceptional example of the Tudor Revival style as interpreted by architect Walter E. Kelly. It exhibits classic Tudor hallmarks, such as decorative half-timbering, as well as features less commonly associated with the style, such as rolled eaves to simulate a thatched roof.

The house was entered on the National Register of Historic Places in 2006.

== See also ==
- National Register of Historic Places listings in Northeast Portland, Oregon
