= Frederick Turner Fourplex =

Historic building in Portland, Oregon, U.S.

- U.S. National Register of Historic Places
- Portland Historic Landmark
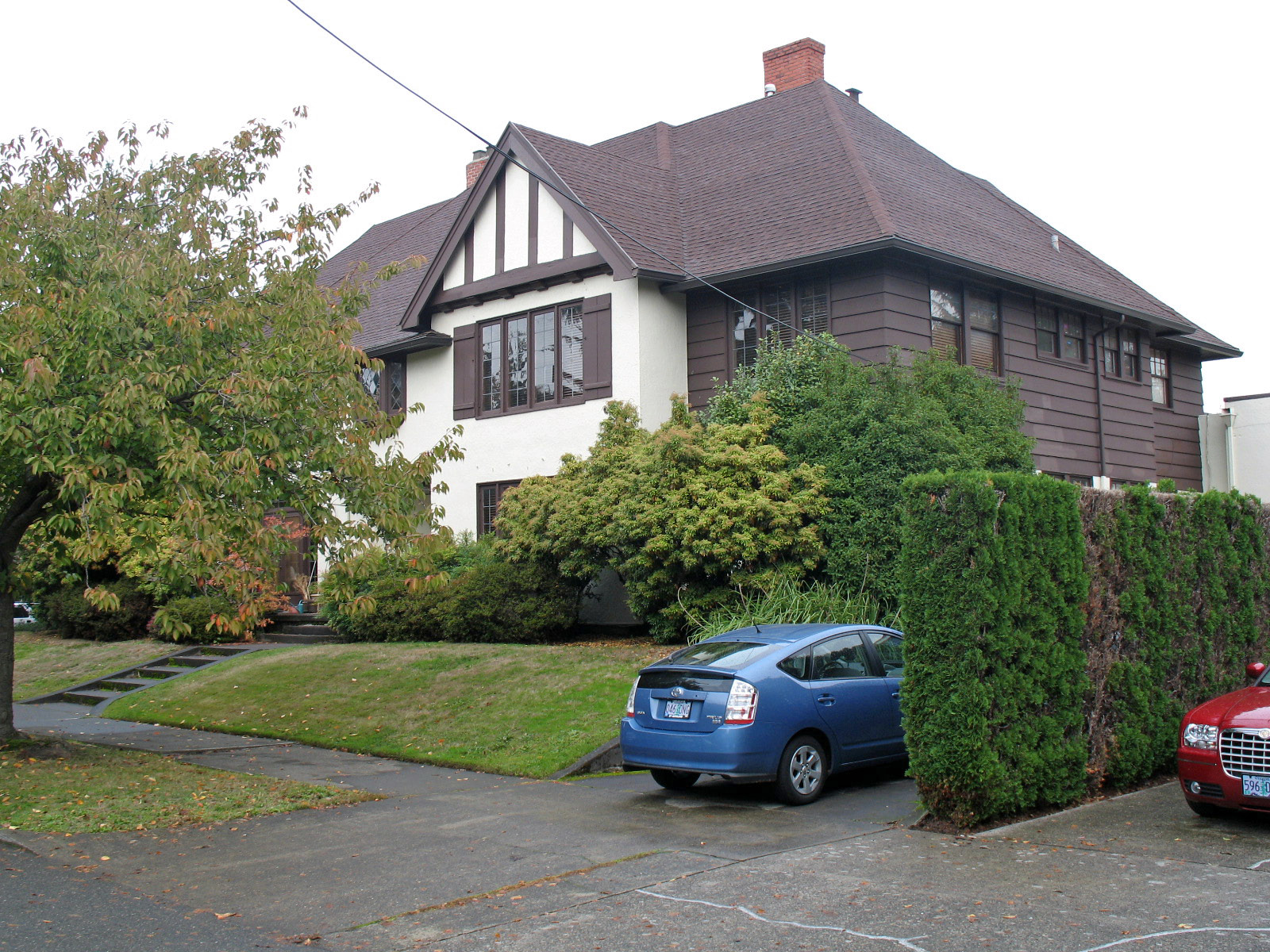
- The building in 2009

- Location within the United States Location within Oregon Location within Portland, Oregon
- Location: 1430 NE 22nd Avenue; Portland, Oregon
- Coordinates: 45°32′00″N 122°38′34″W
- Built: 1928
- Built by: Frederick B. Turner
- Architect: Roscoe Hemenway
- Architectural style: Tudor Revival
- NRHP reference No.: 92000135
- Added to NRHP: March 5, 1992

The Frederick Turner Fourplex is a historic apartment building located in Portland, Oregon, United States. Built in 1928 in the Tudor Revival style, it is an outstanding example of Portland architect Roscoe D. Hemenway's (1889–1959) work in period revival styles during the 1920s through the 1950s. Hemenway was well known for designing well-appointed single-family homes, and the Turner Fourplex is one of very few multi-unit residences he produced. (Note: The National Register nomination document for the Turner Fourplex states that it is the only one of Roscoe Hemenway's multi-unit residential buildings to survive down to 1991. This apparently is incorrect. See for example the Senate Court Apartments.)

The building was entered on the National Register of Historic Places in 1992.

== See also ==
- National Register of Historic Places listings in Northeast Portland, Oregon
