= Zimmerman–Rudeen House =

Historic building in Portland, Oregon, U.S.

- U.S. National Register of Historic Places
- Portland Historic Landmark
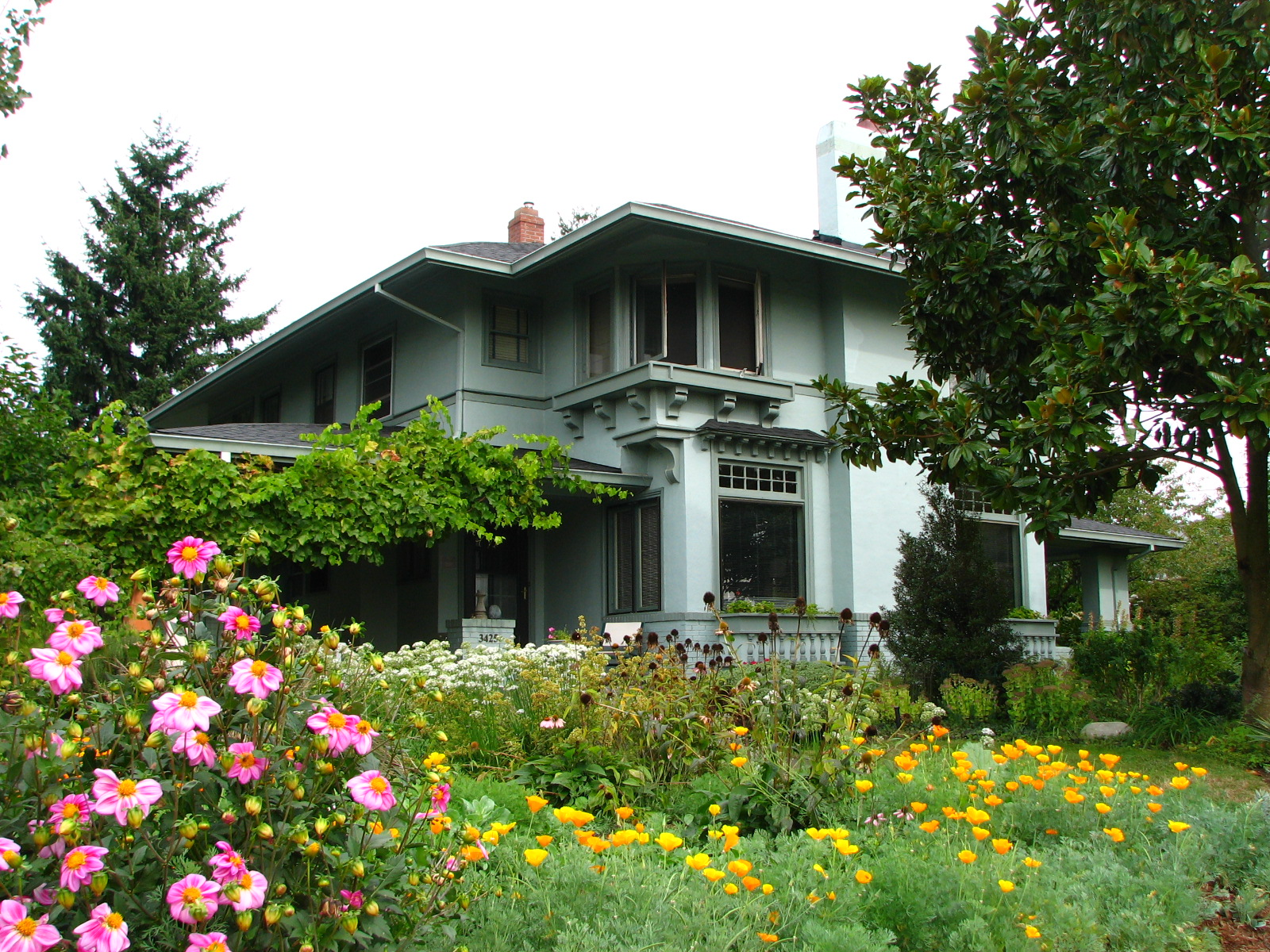

- Location within Portland, Oregon
- Location: 3425 NE Beakey Street; Portland, Oregon
- Coordinates: 45°32′51″N 122°37′42″W
- Built: 1913
- Architect: George A. Eastman
- Architectural style: Prairie School
- NRHP reference No.: 91000811
- Added to NRHP: June 19, 1991

The Zimmerman–Rudeen House is a historic house in Portland, Oregon, United States. It was designed by George A. Eastman and was built in 1913. This Prairie School house was added to the National Register of Historic Places in 1991.

== See also ==
- National Register of Historic Places listings in Northeast Portland, Oregon
