= Fred Tunturi House =

Historic house in Oregon, United States

- U.S. National Register of Historic Places
- Portland Historic Landmark
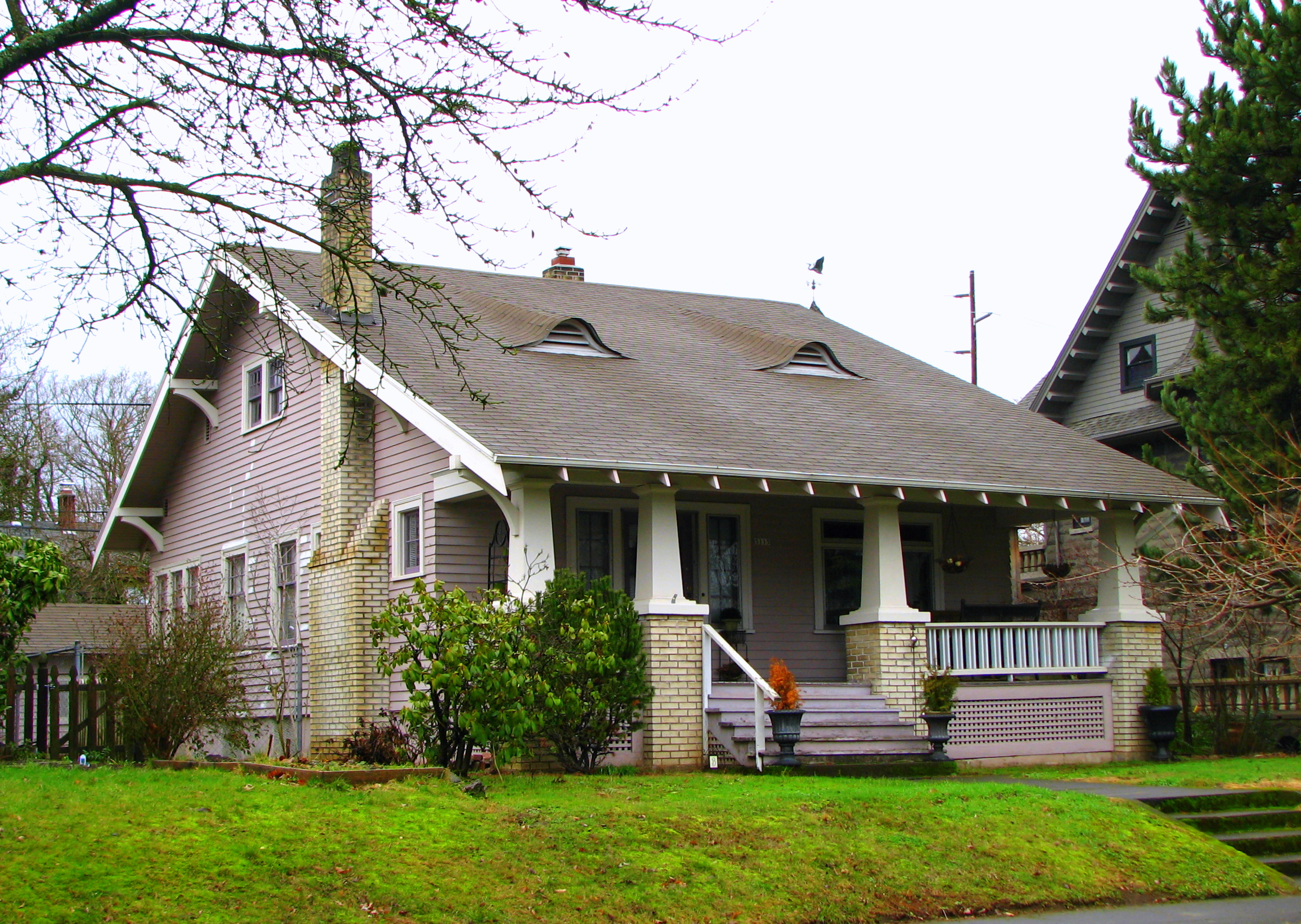
- The house in 2010

- Location within the United States Location within Oregon Location within Portland, Oregon
- Location: 5115 NE Garfield Avenue; Portland, Oregon
- Coordinates: 45°33′36″N 122°39′47″W
- Built: 1922
- Architect: unknown
- Architectural style: Craftsman bungalow
- NRHP reference No.: 96001072
- Added to NRHP: October 3, 1996

The Fred Tunturi House is a historic residence located in Portland, Oregon, United States. Built in 1922, it is the only well-preserved Craftsman bungalow in the Walnut Park district of Portland that exhibits two classic features of the bungalow type: a full-width porch and a low, continuous, gable roof.

The house was entered on the National Register of Historic Places in 1996.

== See also ==
- National Register of Historic Places listings in Northeast Portland, Oregon
