= National Register of Historic Places listings in Northeast Portland, Oregon =

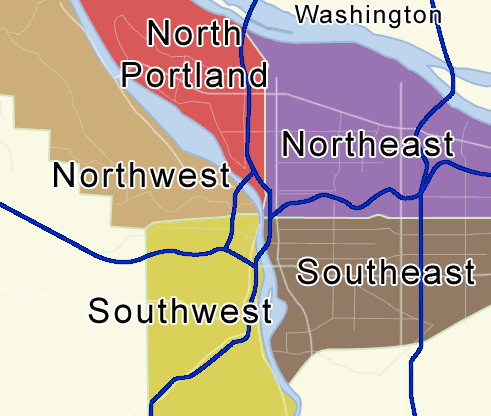
Locator map showing five of Portland's six quadrants. Click a quadrant to go to its National Register list. (South Portland listings are included on the Southwest Portland list.)

This list presents the full set of buildings, structures, objects, sites, or districts designated on the National Register of Historic Places in Northeast Portland, Oregon, United States, and offers brief descriptive information about each of them. The National Register recognizes places of national, state, or local historic significance across the United States. Out of over 90,000 National Register sites nationwide, Oregon is home to over 2,000, and over one-fourth of those are found partially or wholly in Portland. While these sites are widely spread across all six of Portland's quadrants, heavy concentrations are found in the Downtown and Southwest Hills neighborhoods of the Southwest quadrant, and the Northwest District neighborhood of the Northwest quadrant.

Only historic places within the municipal boundaries of Portland are shown in this list and its four companion lists for the other quadrants. Some sites beyond city limits will appear in other lists showing "Portland" as a general locality, but are excluded here. Although Portland's legal boundaries extend into Clackamas and Washington counties, all of the city's National Register sites lie within Multnomah County.

This National Park Service list is complete through NPS recent listings posted July 31, 2026.

== Current listings ==
	Name on the Register	Image	Date listed	Location	Description
1	Simon Abraham Duplex	Simon Abraham Duplex	August 5, 1999 (#99000945)	522–530 NE San Rafael Street; 45°32′13″N 122°39′36″W	This 1890 Queen Anne house is one of extremely few duplexes in the Eliot neighborhood remaining from the late 19th/early 20th centuries. Its early ownership by German Americans and Scandinavian Americans testifies to the settlement by ethnic immigrants in this part of the former city of Albina.
2	Alco Apartments	Alco Apartments	January 17, 2017 (#100000499)	100–110 NE Martin Luther King Jr. Boulevard; 45°31′26″N 122°39′41″W	Built in 1912, this commercial/apartment building typifies the mixed-use development that occurred along Portland's eastside streetcar lines during the early 20th century. Its origins are strongly echoed in the 21st-century renaissance of mixed-use construction and streetcars in Portland, with a new-generation streetcar line immediately opposite the west elevation.
3	Frederick Armbruster Cottage	Frederick Armbruster Cottage	February 16, 2001 (#01000130)	502 NE Tillamook Street; 45°32′16″N 122°39′38″W	This 1898 house is a locally-important example of the application of the Queen Anne style to simple housing for the European immigrant and working class families that flowed into the Eliot neighborhood during the 1880s to early 1900s. The German American Armbruster family operated a pretzel baking business from the back yard for nearly 30 years.
4	Alfred J. and Georgia A. Armstrong House	Alfred J. and Georgia A. Armstrong House	September 14, 2002 (#02001017)	509 NE Prescott Street; 45°33′21″N 122°39′37″W	Built in 1894, this elaborate Queen Anne house is one of very few intact examples of its type remaining from the early years of development in the King neighborhood. It exhibits more defining Queen Anne characteristics than other nearby houses of the same period, including a tower and the large quantity of jigsawed ornamentation.
5	Thomas J. Autzen House	Thomas J. Autzen House	March 9, 1992 (#92000088)	2425 NE Alameda Street; 45°33′06″N 122°38′26″W	This 1927 house is an outstanding example of the Tudor Revival style in both its exterior and interior, and is one of only two houses in Portland by architect Kirtland Cutter. Thomas J. Autzen (1888–1958) was a prominent businessman in the wood products industry, and a pioneer in the manufacture and marketing of plywood.
6	Frank C. Barnes House	Frank C. Barnes House	September 1, 1983 (#83002166)	3533 NE Klickitat Street; 45°32′49″N 122°37′39″W	Businessman Frank C. Barnes (1854–1931), prominent in Portland's grocery and fish processing industries, had this 1914 mansion built as part of a grouping of houses for himself and his wife and children. The house clearly demonstrates the architectural eclecticism of the era, with major elements in the Jacobethan, Colonial Revival, and Neoclassical styles.
7	Barnhart–Wright House	Barnhart–Wright House	June 13, 1997 (#97000582)	1828 NE Knott Street; 45°32′31″N 122°38′48″W	This 1914 house was built in Irvington by general contractor Frederic E. Bowman, who shaped several neighborhoods in the city. It stands as one of the best-preserved and most expensive single-family homes in his body of work, and is an outstanding example of the use of Arts and Crafts architecture with Prairie School influences in an upper-class Portland home.
8	Bay E, West Ankeny Car Barns	Bay E, West Ankeny Car Barns	October 10, 1978 (#78002307)	2706 NE Couch Street; 45°31′24″N 122°38′17″W	This brick building is the last remnant of the complex of maintenance facilities that supported several major streetcar lines in northeast Portland in the late 19th and early 20th centuries. (Note: The Ankeny Car Barns occupied several lots around the intersection of Burnside Street and 28th Avenue. Bay E was part of the western portion of the complex. Seven other barn complexes were located in different parts of Portland.) The complex was opened in 1901 and Bay E was built in 1911, continuing in operation until 1950. It is one of only two structures remaining in Portland from that era's streetcar network.
9	Boschke–Boyd House	Boschke–Boyd House	February 25, 2005 (#05000094)	2211 NE Thompson Street; 45°32′21″N 122°38′34″W	This c. 1910 house is most noted for its association with William E. Boyd (1880–1965), the co-owner and manager of the Benson Hotel for 36 years, during which time it flourished as one of Portland's premier hotels. Boyd lived in the house for 28 years from 1922 to 1950. It has a fine design in the Tudor and Jacobethan styles by Joseph Jacobberger.
10	George W. and Hetty A. Bowers House	George W. and Hetty A. Bowers House	September 23, 2011 (#11000702)	114 NE 22nd Avenue; 45°31′26″N 122°38′36″W	The finest of only three poured-concrete houses in Portland, this 1910 residence was built at the height of the short-lived national trend of experimentation with this building method. Although the method largely died out soon after and especially never gained popularity in Portland, this house was at the cutting edge in its time.
11	F. E. Bowman Apartments	F. E. Bowman Apartments	June 16, 1989 (#89000511)	1624–1636 NE Tillamook Street; 45°32′14″N 122°38′55″W	Constructed in 1913, this is one of the oldest apartment buildings in the Irvington neighborhood, and the best preserved from its era. Through its Craftsman styling, builder Frederic E. Bowman gave attention to blending the building into the neighborhood of pre-existing single-family homes.
12	John and Ellen Bowman House	John and Ellen Bowman House	January 9, 2008 (#07001377)	1719 NE Knott Street; 45°32′33″N 122°38′53″W	This 1916 Colonial Revival house is a prime example of the work of Ellis F. Lawrence (1879–1946), one of Portland's and Oregon's most influential architects. Sited on one of the largest lots in the Irvington neighborhood, it is perhaps Lawrence's grandest residential design. It stands out for fine craftsmanship and materials.
13	Jennie Bramhall House	Jennie Bramhall House	May 27, 1999 (#99000643)	5125 NE Garfield Avenue; 45°33′37″N 122°39′47″W	This house is significant for its highly unusual combination of Queen Anne styling with cast concrete block construction. Built in 1908–1909, it is one of the finest remaining Queen Anne houses in the Albina District, and one of only a few cast concrete houses in that area.
14	Brick House Beautiful	Brick House Beautiful	January 27, 2012 (#11001063)	4005 NE Davis Street; 45°31′31″N 122°37′18″W	This model house was built in 1922–1923 to showcase the product line of the Standard Brick & Tile Company, based in Portland. It was also a demonstration project for the brick hollow-wall method of construction, newly introduced in the Portland market to reduce cost and improve affordability of brick houses.
15	Burnside Bridge	Burnside Bridge	November 14, 2012 (#12000931)	Spanning the Willamette River at river mile 12.7; 45°31′23″N 122°40′03″W	Opened in 1926 as a centerpiece of Portland's transportation system, the Burnside Bridge was embroiled in a public corruption scandal during its development. Part of a three-bridge package funded by a public bond issue, it was one of the final works in bridge engineer Gustav Lindenthal's impressive career. (Note: The three bridges in the bond-funded package were the Burnside Bridge, Ross Island Bridge, and Sellwood Bridge (which has since been demolished and replaced). Lindenthal was the supervising engineer for the construction of all three bridges. He was responsible for the design of the Ross Island and Sellwood bridges, but for the Burnside Bridge he adapted a design by Ira G. Hedrick and Robert E. Kremers. Hedrick and Kremers were removed from the project due to the corruption scandal.) It is one of the country's heaviest bascule bridges, and the earliest to use a concrete deck on the lift span.
16	Beatrice Morrow and E. D. Cannady House	Beatrice Morrow and E. D. Cannady House	February 16, 2024 (#100009989)	2516 NE 26th Avenue; 45°32′27″N 122°38′20″W	
17	George Earle Chamberlain House	George Earle Chamberlain House	June 19, 1991 (#91000815)	1927 NE Tillamook Street; 45°32′16″N 122°38′46″W	George Earle Chamberlain (1854–1928) worked in public service for over 40 years, including as Oregon's 11th state Governor (1903–1909) and as U.S. Senator (1909–1921). He acquired this Colonial Revival house in 1904 and lived there nearly until his death, associating it with the later, most prominent portion of his career. (Note: The Chamberlain House was originally built in 1893 for Frank M. Warren Sr. (1848–1912), a well-known businessman in the salmon industry who later died aboard the Titanic.) He remodeled the house extensively and his imprint on the house has been preserved.
18	Clovelly Garden Apartments	Clovelly Garden Apartments	May 19, 1983 (#83002169)	6307–6319 NE Martin Luther King Jr. Boulevard; 45°34′05″N 122°39′42″W	This 1928 Tudor Revival building is a fine example of the garden apartments popular in Portland in the late 1920s and early 1930s. It was designed by prominent architect Carl L. Linde under commission to George Nease, an influential timber businessman. It contains light fixtures designed by Fred Baker, a master lighting designer in Portland in that period.
19	Coleman–Scott House	Coleman–Scott House	November 8, 1985 (#85003504)	2110 NE 16th Avenue; 45°32′16″N 122°38′57″W	Architect John V. Bennes designed this richly-appointed 1916 Colonial Revival house for engineer and businessman John D. Coleman. It later became the home of Coleman's son-in-law Leslie M. Scott (1878–1968). During his 49-year residency, Scott was vice president of The Oregonian, a scholar of Pacific Northwest history, and pursued a career in public service and politics, highlighted by two terms as Oregon State Treasurer.
20	James C. and Mary A. Costello House	James C. and Mary A. Costello House	September 28, 2001 (#01001068)	2043 NE Tillamook Street; 45°32′16″N 122°38′41″W	This 1910 house is an excellent example of the work of prominent architect Joseph Jacobberger at the height of the Arts and Crafts style in Portland residential architecture. During his prolific career Jacobberger contributed greatly to the spread of that style in Portland.
21	Virgil and Beulah Crum House	Virgil and Beulah Crum House	August 5, 1999 (#99000944)	4438 NE Alameda Street; 45°32′35″N 122°37′05″W	
22	Dean's Beauty Salon and Barber Shop	Dean's Beauty Salon and Barber Shop	February 23, 2022 (#100007455)	213–215 NE Hancock Street; 45°32′12″N 122°39′48″W	Purpose-built in 1956, this is one of the relatively few Black-owned businesses to survive the urban renewal, disinvestment, and gentrification that decimated the Black business district in lower Albina. It represents the history of African American entrepreneurship in the Albina area and the importance of the hair care industry in African American culture. As of 2021, it is the oldest continuously operated Black-owned business in Oregon.
23	Del Rey Apartments	Del Rey Apartments	February 20, 1991 (#91000040)	2555 NE Glisan Street; 45°31′37″N 122°38′22″W	
24	Henry B. Dickson House	Henry B. Dickson House	August 1, 1997 (#97000849)	2123 NE 21st Avenue; 45°32′16″N 122°38′41″W	
25	Frank Silas Doernbecher House	Frank Silas Doernbecher House	March 14, 1978 (#78002311)	2323 NE Tillamook Street; 45°32′16″N 122°38′30″W	Frank S. Doernbecher (1861–1921) was a prominent furniture manufacturer and philanthropist, notably as the benefactor of Doernbecher Children's Hospital. His c. 1903 house is an outstanding example of the Tudor Revival style in the upscale neighborhood of Irvington. Much of the interior paneling and woodwork was hand-carved at Doernbecher's own factory.
26	Emerson Apartments	Emerson Apartments	January 27, 2000 (#99001714)	5310 N Williams Avenue; 45°33′43″N 122°40′00″W	
27	Raymond and Catherine Fisher House	Raymond and Catherine Fisher House	March 2, 2006 (#06000096)	1625 NE Marine Drive; 45°36′02″N 122°38′54″W	
28	Gustav Freiwald House	Gustav Freiwald House	May 27, 1993 (#93000454)	1810 NE 15th Avenue; 45°32′09″N 122°39′00″W	
29	German Baptist Old People's Home	German Baptist Old People's Home	October 23, 2020 (#100005724)	850 NE 81st Avenue; 45°31′44″N 122°34′46″W	
30	Lewis T. Gilliland House	Lewis T. Gilliland House	February 23, 1989 (#89000063)	2229 NE Brazee Street; 45°32′27″N 122°38′33″W	This excellent 1910 example of the American Craftsman style was designed by prominent Portland architect Ellis F. Lawrence by closely adapting plans published by Gustav Stickley. (Note: Specifically, Lawrence based the Gilliland House on "A Bungalow of Irregular Form and Unusually Interesting Construction", published by Stickley in Craftsman Homes (1909).) Stickley was the leading national exponent of Craftsman architecture, and no other work by Lawrence so precisely captures Stickley's aesthetic.
31	Groat–Gates House	Groat–Gates House	February 23, 1989 (#89000062)	35 NE 22nd Avenue; 45°31′24″N 122°38′38″W	
32	Hancock Street Fourplex	Hancock Street Fourplex	February 11, 1993 (#93000023)	1414 NE Hancock Street; 45°32′10″N 122°39′04″W	
33	William A. Haseltine House	William A. Haseltine House	October 17, 1991 (#91001551)	3231 NE U.S. Grant Place; 45°32′17″N 122°37′56″W	
34	Hibernian Hall	Hibernian Hall	August 4, 2005 (#05000826)	128 NE Russell Street; 45°32′26″N 122°39′48″W	
35	Hollywood Theatre	Hollywood Theatre	September 1, 1983 (#83002172)	4122 NE Sandy Boulevard; 45°32′08″N 122°37′14″W	
36	Irvington Bowman Apartments	Irvington Bowman Apartments	September 14, 2002 (#02000968)	1825–1835 NE 16th Avenue; 45°32′10″N 122°38′59″W	
37	Irvington Historic District	Irvington Historic District	October 22, 2010 (#10000850)	Roughly bounded by NE Fremont Street, NE Broadway, and NE 7th and 27th Avenues; 45°32′31″N 122°38′54″W	Historic Residential Suburbs in the United States, 1830–1960 MPS
38	Irvington Tennis Club	Irvington Tennis Club	October 17, 1990 (#90001513)	2131 NE Thompson Street; 45°32′21″N 122°38′37″W	
39	Jantzen Knitting Mills Company Building	Jantzen Knitting Mills Company Building	June 24, 1991 (#91000812)	1935 NE Glisan Street; 45°31′38″N 122°38′46″W	
40	O. K. Jeffery Aircraft Factory	O. K. Jeffery Aircraft Factory	October 18, 2021 (#100007087)	3300 NE Broadway; 45°32′06″N 122°37′49″W	
41	Oliver and Margaret Jeffrey House	Oliver and Margaret Jeffrey House	September 21, 2005 (#05001059)	3033 NE Bryce Street; 45°33′06″N 122°38′04″W	
42	Jensen Investment Company Building	Jensen Investment Company Building	August 5, 1999 (#99000941)	2500–2522 NE Martin Luther King Jr. Boulevard; 45°32′26″N 122°39′41″W	
43	Charles E. Johnson Building	Charles E. Johnson Building	August 5, 1999 (#99000949)	442 NE Russell Street; 45°32′28″N 122°39′38″W	
44	H. C. Keck House – Mount Olivet Parsonage	H. C. Keck House – Mount Olivet Parsonage	October 10, 2002 (#02001124)	53 NE Thompson Street; 45°32′21″N 122°39′55″W	Built in 1899 by German American carpenter Henry C. Keck, this house illustrates the settlement of Albina by ethnic Europeans. As the presence of African Americans in Albina increased, it was purchased by Mount Olivet Baptist Church in 1929 to be its parsonage. In that role, the house was home to locally prominent civil rights leaders Rev. Jonathan L. Caston and Rev. J. James Clow.
45	Edward H. and Bertha R. Keller House	Edward H. and Bertha R. Keller House	November 20, 2009 (#09000943)	3028 NE Alameda Street; 45°32′59″N 122°38′06″W	This excellent 1924 example of an English Cottage revival house was one of the few single-family homes designed by Portland architect Elmer E. Feig. Many of the themes and features of the Keller house foreshadowed his later work with large apartment buildings.
46	John D. Kennedy Elementary School	John D. Kennedy Elementary School	November 22, 1995 (#88003472)	5736 NE 33rd Avenue; 45°33′52″N 122°37′49″W	
47	Albertina Kerr Nursery	Albertina Kerr Nursery	August 29, 1979 (#79002135)	424 NE 22nd Avenue; 45°31′34″N 122°38′35″W	
48	Laurelhurst Historic District	Laurelhurst Historic District	March 18, 2019 (#100003462)	Roughly bounded by SE Stark Street, NE Senate Street, and 32nd and 44th Avenues (See also Southeast Portland.); 45°31′32″N 122°37′27″W	Built starting in 1910, this is an exceptional case of a streetcar suburb planned, developed, and marketed by a single entity. Its winding streets combined with radial thoroughfares make an unusually full expression of the ideals of the City Beautiful movement. The c. 1700 houses in the district illustrate the popular trends in domestic architecture through the 1940s. Aimed at the middle and upper class market for single-family homes, Laurelhurst's exclusionary rules were accentuated by zoning codes and racially restrictive deed covenants.
49	Henry C. Leutgert Building	Henry C. Leutgert Building	May 27, 1999 (#99000642)	2323–2329 NE Rodney Avenue; 45°32′23″N 122°39′51″W	
50	Lindquist Apartment House	Lindquist Apartment House	February 19, 1993 (#93000022)	711 NE Randall Street; 45°31′41″N 122°38′19″W	
51	Robert F. Lytle House	Robert F. Lytle House	May 19, 1983 (#83002173)	1914 NE 22nd Avenue; 45°32′12″N 122°38′34″W	
52	Mallory Avenue Christian Church	Mallory Avenue Christian Church	February 25, 2021 (#100006187)	126 NE Alberta St. 45°33′32″N 122°39′50″W	
53	Anna Lewis Mann Old People's Home	Anna Lewis Mann Old People's Home	October 15, 1992 (#92001380)	1021–1025 NE 33rd Avenue; 45°31′50″N 122°37′53″W	
54	George W. and Hannah Martin – John B. and Minnie Hosford House	George W. and Hannah Martin – John B. and Minnie Hosford House	February 27, 2003 (#03000073)	2004 NE 9th Avenue; 45°32′13″N 122°39′22″W	
55	McAvinney Fourplex	McAvinney Fourplex	February 6, 2006 (#05001147)	2004 NE 17th Avenue; 45°32′13″N 122°38′53″W	
56	Daniel C. and Katie A. McDonald House	Daniel C. and Katie A. McDonald House	March 6, 2019 (#100003459)	2944 NE Couch Street; 45°31′24″N 122°38′06″W	
57	Elmer and Linnie Miller House	Elmer and Linnie Miller House	February 28, 2020 (#100005017)	89 NE Thompson Street; 45°32′21″N 122°39′52″W	
58	Fred O. Miller House	Fred O. Miller House	January 18, 2006 (#05001540)	2329 NE Thompson Street; 45°32′21″N 122°38′29″W	
59	Henry B. Miller House	Henry B. Miller House	October 30, 1989 (#89001865)	2439 NE 21st Avenue; 45°32′25″N 122°38′41″W	
60	Mt. Olivet Baptist Church	Mt. Olivet Baptist Church	February 23, 2022 (#100007457)	1734 NE 1st Ave. 45°32′08″N 122°39′53″W	
61	Nicolai–Cake–Olson House	Nicolai–Cake–Olson House	August 8, 2001 (#01000828)	1903 NE Hancock Street; 45°32′12″N 122°38′47″W	
62	Normandale Field	Normandale Field	May 20, 2024 (#100010362)	NE 57th Avenue and NE Hassalo Street; 45°31′49″N 122°36′19″W	Normandale Field has been called Erv Lind Stadium since 1964.
63	Northwest Fence and Wire Works	Northwest Fence and Wire Works	August 4, 2005 (#05000828)	400–418 NE 11th Avenue; 45°31′34″N 122°39′15″W	
64	Northwestern Electric Company – Alberta Substation	Northwestern Electric Company – Alberta Substation	March 5, 1998 (#98000207)	2701–2717 NE Alberta Street; 45°33′33″N 122°38′16″W	
65	Olsen and Weygandt Building	Olsen and Weygandt Building	February 11, 1993 (#93000024)	1421–1441 NE Broadway; 45°32′07″N 122°39′03″W	
66	August Olson House	August Olson House	June 3, 1996 (#96000624)	2509 NE 18th Avenue; 45°32′27″N 122°38′51″W	
67	Oregon State Bank Building	Oregon State Bank Building	July 12, 2000 (#00000801)	4200 NE Sandy Boulevard; 45°32′10″N 122°37′11″W	
68	Page and Son Apartments	Page and Son Apartments	March 8, 1989 (#89000113)	723–737 E Burnside Street; 45°31′23″N 122°39′28″W	
69	Parkview Apartments	Parkview Apartments	March 6, 1992 (#92000085)	1760 NE Irving Street; 45°31′38″N 122°38′55″W	
70	Pearson Mortuary	Pearson Mortuary	December 13, 2007 (#07001261)	301 NE Knott Street; 45°32′32″N 122°39′47″W	
71	Jim Pepper House	Jim Pepper House	June 15, 2023 (#100009051)	10809 NE Fremont St. 45°32′54″N 122°33′05″W	
72	Pipes Family House	Pipes Family House	December 23, 2005 (#05001150)	3045 NE 9th Avenue; 45°32′42″N 122°39′25″W	
73	John E. G. Povey House	John E. G. Povey House	August 28, 1998 (#98001121)	1312 NE Tillamook Street; 45°32′14″N 122°39′07″W	
74	Ira F. Powers Warehouse and Factory	Ira F. Powers Warehouse and Factory	August 31, 2011 (#11000625)	123 NE 3rd Avenue; 45°31′26″N 122°39′47″W	This 1925 building is one of the last remnants of two important phases in Portland's economic history: the city's once-prominent furniture manufacturing and distribution industry, and worker housing for the war industries of the World War II era.
75	Thomas Prince House	Thomas Prince House	October 23, 1986 (#86002911)	2903 NE Alameda Street; 45°33′02″N 122°38′08″W	
76	Reed–Wells House	Reed–Wells House	August 20, 2004 (#04000878)	2168 NE Multnomah Street; 45°31′53″N 122°38′36″W	This 1905 house is a well-preserved example of the early development of the Sullivan's Gulch neighborhood. The neighborhood initially unfolded as a district of single-family homes affordable for the expanding middle class. Later commercial and multi-family construction decreased the dominance of houses such as this.
77	Rocky Butte Scenic Drive Historic District	Rocky Butte Scenic Drive Historic District	October 17, 1991 (#91001550)	Along NE Rocky Butte Road with parts of NE Fremont Street and NE 92nd Avenue; 45°32′48″N 122°33′57″W	Built between 1934 and 1939, this WPA-funded roadway and park emulate many of the technical and aesthetic features of the Columbia River Highway, especially in their extensive stonemasonry. They also illustrate the increasing prevalence of automotive recreation in this period. The 1933 aircraft beacon at the summit, one of only a few remaining in the U.S., recalls the era of air navigation by dead reckoning.
78	Roome–Stearns House	Roome–Stearns House	March 9, 1992 (#92000087)	2146 NE 12th Avenue; 45°32′17″N 122°39′11″W	This house is the best and most unaltered remaining example of a modest, cottage-scale Queen Anne home in the Irvington neighborhood, exhibiting elegant Eastlake details on the interior. It was built in 1893 by the Portland Cottage Building Association, a short-lived company that developed several cottage-type houses in the area.
79	Rose City Golf Clubhouse	Rose City Golf Clubhouse	October 31, 2012 (#12000900)	2200 NE 71st Avenue; 45°32′17″N 122°35′24″W	
80	Alfred C. and Nettie Ruby House	Alfred C. and Nettie Ruby House	January 26, 2006 (#05001559)	211 NE César E. Chávez Boulevard; 45°31′31″N 122°37′24″W	Built in 1926–1927, this house is an exceptional example of the Tudor Revival style. It exhibits classic Tudor hallmarks, such as decorative half-timbering, as well as features less commonly associated with the style, such as rolled eaves to simulate a thatched roof.
81	Rutherford House	Rutherford House	August 5, 2015 (#14001076)	833 NE Shaver Street; 45°33′08″N 122°39′25″W	Otto Rutherford (1911–2000) and Verdell Burdine Rutherford (1913–2001) were leaders in the civil rights movement in Oregon, importantly as president (Otto, 1952 to 1954) and secretary (Verdell, late 1940s to 1962) of the NAACP Portland branch. Their house became a center of meeting, organization, planning, and publishing in support of the African American community's struggle for equal rights. A notable success came with passage of the 1953 Oregon Public Accommodations Act, attributable in large measure to the Rutherfords' work.
82	Salerno Apartments	Salerno Apartments	January 28, 1994 (#93001563)	2325 NE Flanders Street; 45°31′33″N 122°38′31″W	The courtyard of this 1930 Mediterranean Revival apartment building evokes "a quiet street in an old Mediterranean town". Architect Carl L. Linde experimented with garden court-type apartments in the nearby 1929 Sorrento Apartments, and perfected the form here.
83	Senate Court Apartments	Senate Court Apartments	February 21, 1997 (#97000129)	203–223 NE 22nd Avenue; 45°31′28″N 122°38′38″W	In this apartment building, architect Roscoe Hemenway employed the Colonial Revival style to draw out an air of respectability and tradition, in an effort to make apartment living more appealing to a middle-class clientele. Built in 1944 for developer Douglas W. Lowell, the complex was aimed at single women working in war industries. Lowell went on to develop over 3,000 housing units in Portland through his career.
84	Seufert House	Seufert House	October 10, 2006 (#06000944)	1511 NE Knott Street; 45°32′32″N 122°39′00″W	This 1913 Colonial Revival house was the Portland home of fishing and canning businessman Francis A. Seufert (1853–1929) from 1914 to his death. Seufert was an innovative leader in the upper Columbia River salmon industry at The Dalles. He pioneered use of the fish wheel to harvest fish, as well as the shipment of fresh, iced salmon to eastern markets.
85	Fred A., May, and Ann Shogren House	Fred A., May, and Ann Shogren House	July 3, 1989 (#89000517)	400 NE 62nd Avenue; 45°31′33″N 122°35′57″W	For nearly 30 years, sisters May (1861–1928) and Ann (1868–1934) Shogren were the premier dressmakers and arbiters of women's fashion to the wealthy elite in Portland. They lived in this c. 1906 Craftsman house, originally built for their brother Fred, from 1912, through retirement in 1918, and until their deaths.
86	Spies–Robinson House	Spies–Robinson House	June 13, 1997 (#97000583)	2424 NE 17th Avenue; 45°32′24″N 122°38′53″W	This 1922 house is an exceptional example of a Prairie School design in Northeast Portland. Its use of a brick veneer is nearly unique locally, where stucco predominates in Prairie School houses. It was also the home of David Robinson (1890–1963), a prominent attorney and civil rights advocate. Robinson is especially associated with public defender services and legal aid, and with the Anti-Defamation League.
87	Tannler–Armstrong House	Tannler–Armstrong House	September 6, 2002 (#02000948)	4420 NE Alameda Street; 45°32′36″N 122°37′05″W	This house is a well-preserved and locally distinct example of the English Cottage style. Built in 1924, it was designed during a period when the style was very popular for new homes in Northeast Portland. (Note: Between 1920 and 1935, over fifty homes were built in the English Cottage style in Northeast Portland. See also Edward H. and Bertha R. Keller House.) The house exhibits many of the defining characteristics of the English Cottage style, most visibly including rolled eaves to imitate a thatched roof.
88	Thompson Court Apartments	Thompson Court Apartments	February 21, 1997 (#97000121)	2304–2314 NE 11th Avenue; 45°32′21″N 122°39′15″W	This building represents an excellent example of architect Ewald T. Pape's steps toward making apartment living more appealing to the middle class. Built in 1929, the building incorporates features such as two-story townhouse-type units, an L shape footprint to create greenspace, individual front and back entrances to each unit with individual addresses, and an overall emphasis on interior function over exterior design.
89	Fred Tunturi House	Fred Tunturi House	October 3, 1996 (#96001072)	5115 NE Garfield Avenue; 45°33′36″N 122°39′47″W	Built in 1922, this is the only well-preserved Craftsman bungalow in the Walnut Park district of Portland that exhibits two classic features of the bungalow type: a full-width porch and a low, continuous, gable roof.
90	Frederick Turner Fourplex	Frederick Turner Fourplex	March 5, 1992 (#92000135)	1430 NE 22nd Avenue; 45°32′00″N 122°38′34″W	Built in 1928, this Tudor Revival apartment building is an outstanding example of Portland architect Roscoe D. Hemenway's work in period revival styles during the 1920s through the 1950s. It is one of very few multi-unit residences he produced. (Note: The source document states that the Turner Fourplex is the only one of Roscoe Hemenway's multi-unit residential buildings to survive down to 1991. This apparently is incorrect. See for example the Senate Court Apartments.)
91	Lewis and Elizabeth Van Vleet House	Lewis and Elizabeth Van Vleet House	September 3, 2001 (#01000937)	202 NE Graham Street; 45°32′33″N 122°39′48″W	Built in 1894 in the Queen Anne style, this house was the home of Lewis Van Vleet (1826–1910), the United States Deputy Surveyor for the Pacific Northwest for 40 years. It was later the home of Rozelle Jackson Yee (1913–2000), a leader in the African American community active in promoting neighborhood involvement in the redevelopment projects that vastly altered the Albina area. (Note: Notable redevelopment and urban renewal projects that impacted the Albina area include the expansion of Emanuel Hospital, the construction of Interstate 5 and the Fremont Bridge, and the construction of Memorial Coliseum.)
92	Louis and Elizabeth Woerner House	Louis and Elizabeth Woerner House	June 1, 2005 (#05000516)	2815 NE Alameda Street; 45°33′02″N 122°38′16″W	Arts and Crafts. Woerner House (1922)
93	Zimmerman–Rudeen House	Zimmerman–Rudeen House	June 19, 1991 (#91000811)	3425 NE Beakey Street; 45°32′51″N 122°37′42″W	Prairie School house (1913) designed by George A. Eastman.

== Former listings ==
	Name on the Register	Image	Date listed	Date removed	Location	Description
1	Charles Looff 20-Sweep Menagerie Carousel		August 26, 1987 (#87001379)	May 27, 1998	NE Holladay Street at NE 8th Avenue; 45°31′47″N 122°39′27″W	Now located in San Diego, California.
2	Shriners Hospital for Crippled Children	Shriners Hospital for Crippled Children	October 30, 1989 (#89001869)	June 8, 2011	8200 NE Sandy Boulevard; 45°33′09″N 122°34′43″W	Building deconstructed in 2004, site redeveloped as Columbia Knoll housing complex.
3	Trinity Lutheran Church and School	Trinity Lutheran Church and School	May 7, 1980 (#80003377)	January 4, 2008	106 NE Ivy Street; 45°32′50″N 122°39′50″W	Destroyed by fire.

== See also ==
- National Register of Historic Places listings in Oregon
- National Register of Historic Places listings in Multnomah County, Oregon
- Listings in neighboring counties: Clackamas, Clark, Columbia, Hood River, Skamania, Washington
- Historic preservation
- History of Portland, Oregon
- Lists of Oregon-related topics
