= Jennie Bramhall House =

Historic building in Portland, Oregon, U.S.

- U.S. National Register of Historic Places
- Portland Historic Landmark
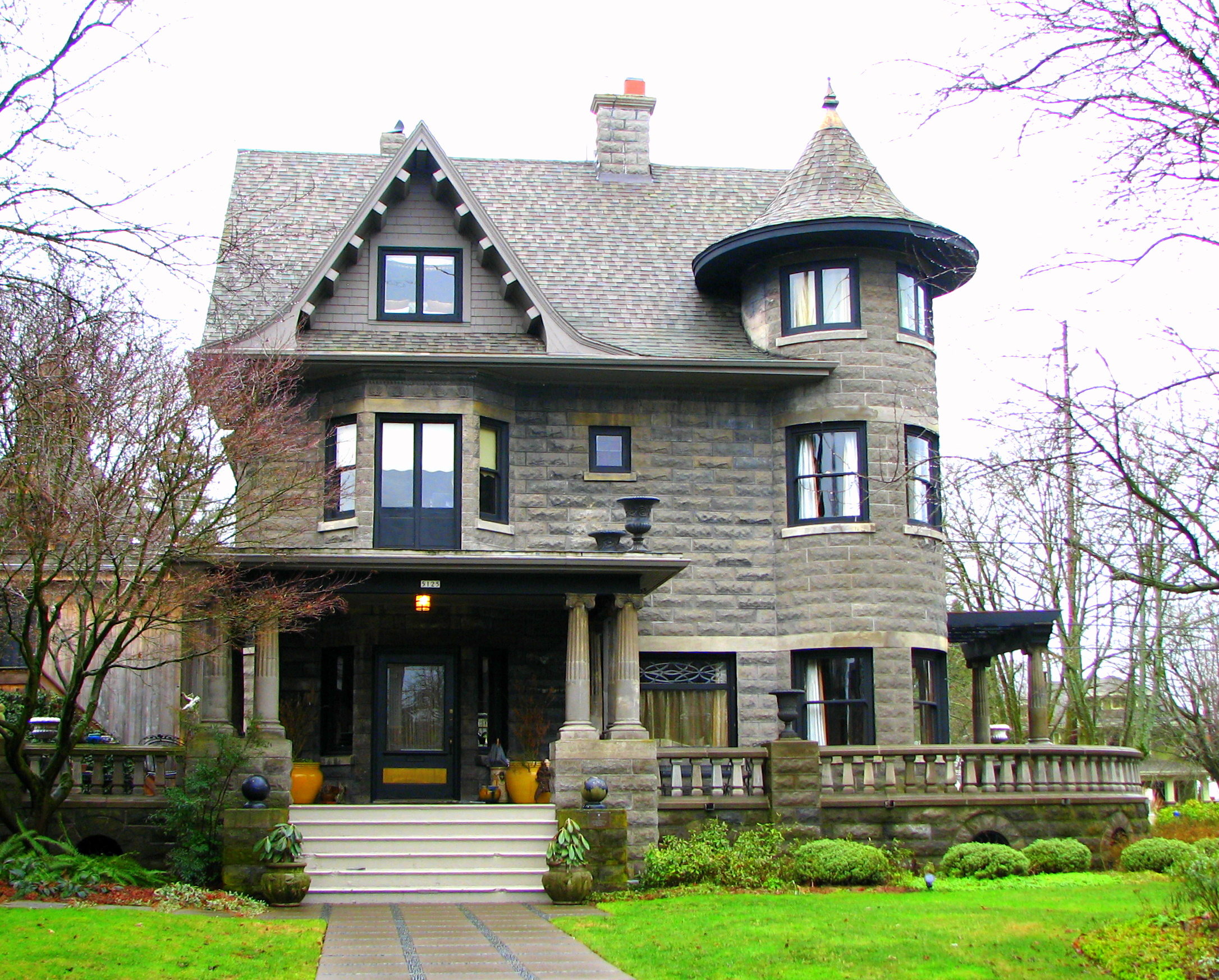
- Jennie Bramhall House in 2010

- Location within Portland, Oregon Location within Oregon Location within the United States
- Location: 5125 NE Garfield Avenue; Portland, Oregon
- Coordinates: 45°33′37″N 122°39′47″W
- Area: 0.23 acres (0.093 ha)
- Built: 1909
- Architectural style: Queen Anne
- NRHP reference No.: 99000643
- Added to NRHP: May 27, 1999

The Jennie Bramhall House is a historic house located in northeast Portland, Oregon, United States. It is significant for its highly unusual combination of Queen Anne styling with cast concrete block construction. Built in 1908–1909, it is one of the finest remaining Queen Anne houses in the Albina district, and one of only a few cast concrete houses in that area.

It was listed on the National Register of Historic Places in 1999.

== See also ==
- National Register of Historic Places listings in Northeast Portland, Oregon
