= Elmer and Linnie Miller House =

Historic building in Portland, Oregon, U.S.

- U.S. National Register of Historic Places
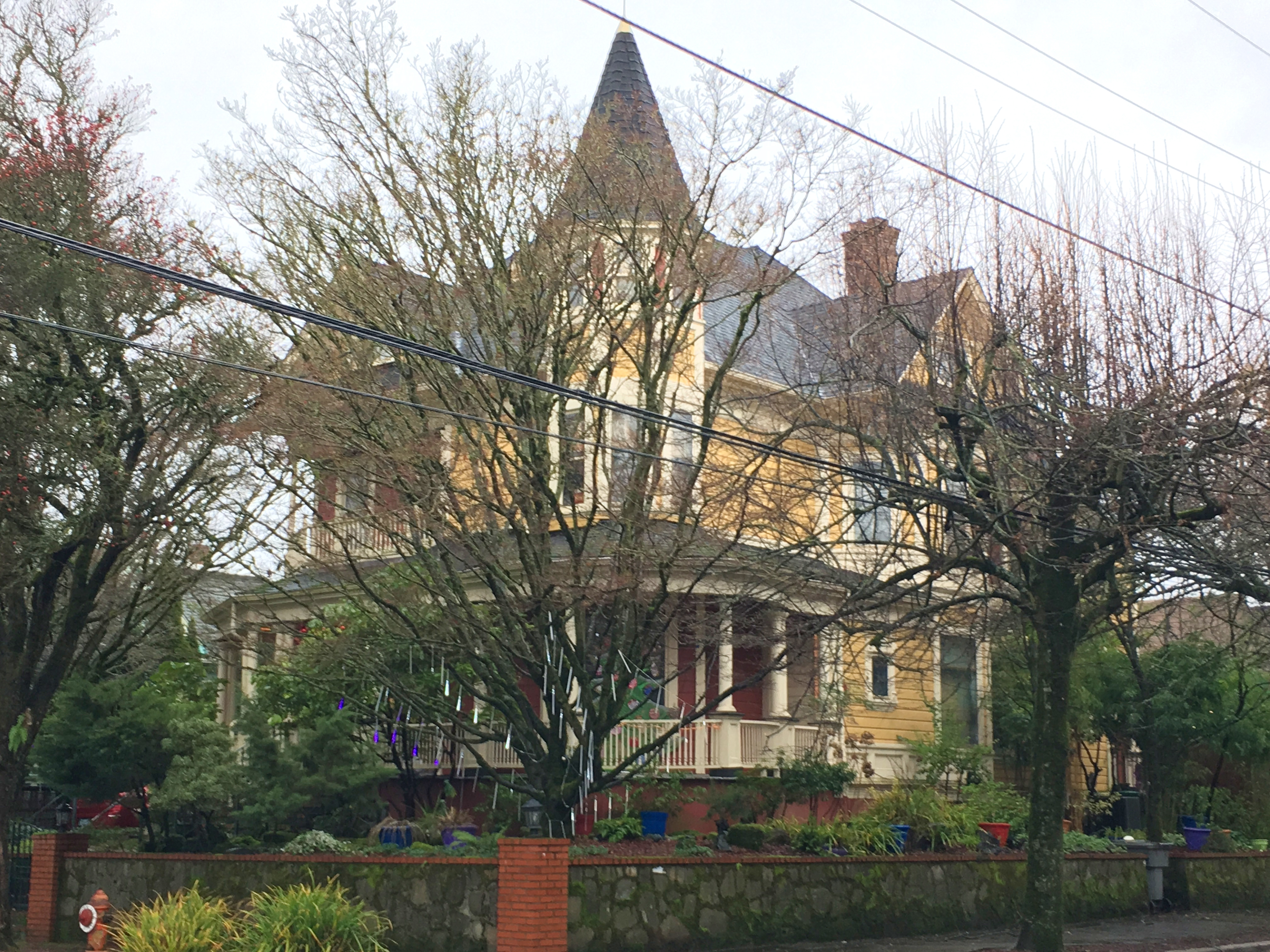
- Interactive map of Elmer and Linnie Miller House
- Location: Portland, Oregon, U.S.
- Coordinates: 45°32′21″N 122°39′52″W
- Built: 1896
- Architectural style: Queen Anne-style
- NRHP reference No.: 100005017

The Elmer and Linnie Miller House (89 NE Thompson Street) is an historic house in Portland, Oregon, listed on the National Register of Historic Places. The 1896 Queen Anne-style house in the city's Eliot neighborhood was owned by Walter Cole, the drag queen known as Darcelle XV, as of 2020.

== See also ==
- National Register of Historic Places listings in Northeast Portland, Oregon
