= Hancock Street Fourplex =

Historic building in Portland, Oregon, U.S.

- U.S. National Register of Historic Places
- Portland Historic Landmark
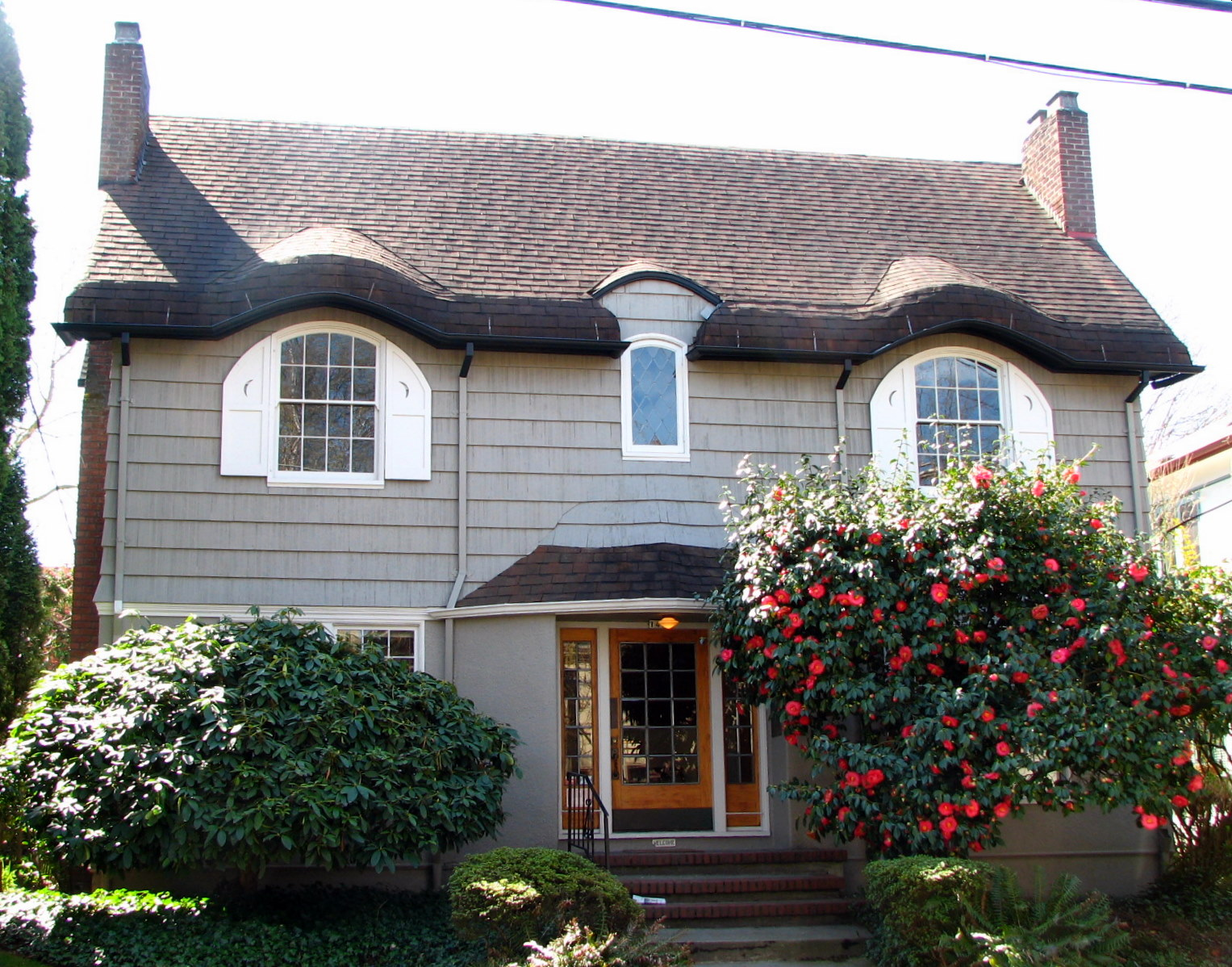

- Location within Portland, Oregon Location within Oregon Location within the United States
- Location: 1414 NE Hancock Street; Portland, Oregon
- Coordinates: 45°32′10″N 122°39′04″W
- Area: 0.1 acres (0.040 ha)
- Built: 1928
- Built by: Reimers & Jolivette
- Architectural style: Late 19th and 20th Century Revivals, English Cottage
- NRHP reference No.: 93000023
- Added to NRHP: February 11, 1993

The Hancock Street Fourplex is a complex located in northeast Portland, Oregon listed on the National Register of Historic Places.

== See also ==
- National Register of Historic Places listings in Northeast Portland, Oregon
