= Jensen Investment Company Building =

Historic building in Portland, Oregon, U.S.

- U.S. National Register of Historic Places
- Portland Historic Landmark
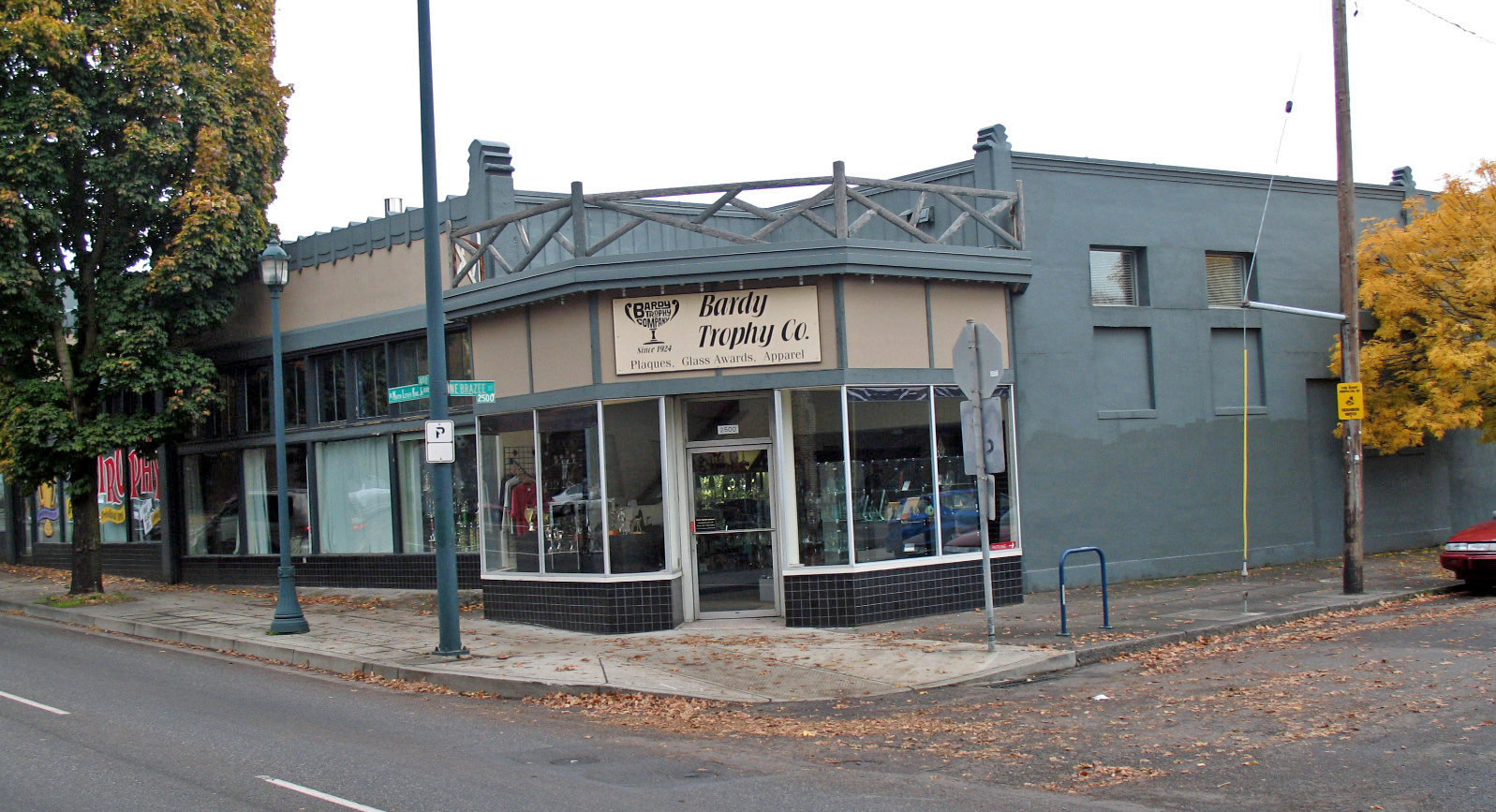

- Location within Portland, Oregon Location within Oregon Location within the United States
- Location: 2500 NE Martin Luther King Jr. Boulevard; Portland, Oregon
- Coordinates: 45°32′26″N 122°39′41″W
- Area: 0.4 acres (0.16 ha)
- Built: 1930
- Built by: Lorenz Brothers
- Architect: William Aitken
- Architectural style: Art Deco
- MPS: Eliot Neighborhood MPS
- NRHP reference No.: 99000941
- Added to NRHP: August 5, 1999

The Jensen Investment Company Building is a building located in northeast Portland, Oregon, listed on the National Register of Historic Places.

== See also ==
- National Register of Historic Places listings in Northeast Portland, Oregon
