= Oregon State Bank Building =

Historic building in Portland, Oregon, U.S.

- U.S. National Register of Historic Places
- Portland Historic Landmark
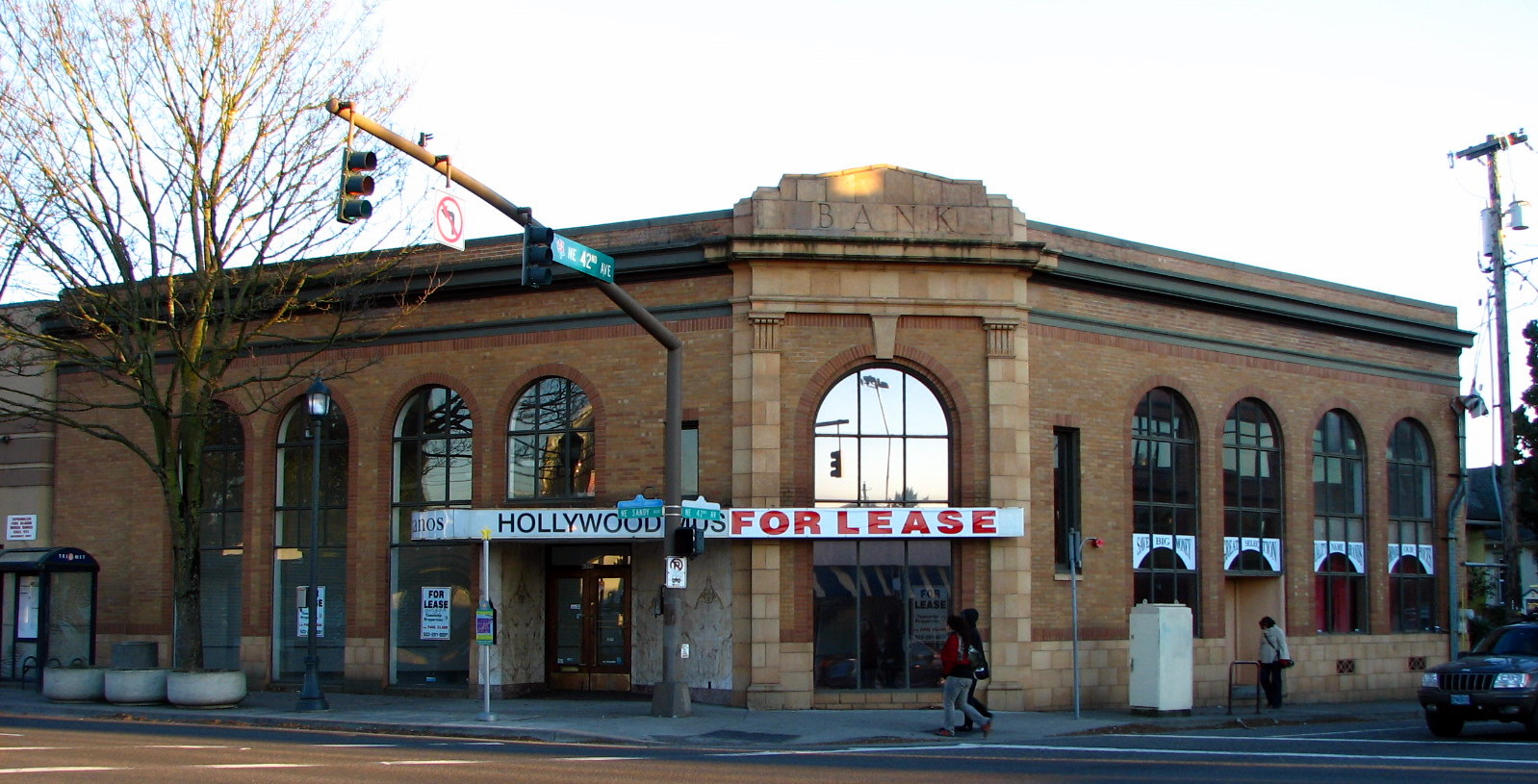
- Oregon State Bank Building in 2009

- Location within Portland, Oregon
- Location: 4200 NE Sandy Boulevard; Portland, Oregon
- Coordinates: 45°32′10″N 122°37′11″W
- Area: less than one acre
- Built: 1927
- Architect: Houghtaling, Chester A.; Hickok, L.L.
- Architectural style: Late 19th And 20th Century Revivals
- MPS: Hollywood's Historic Commercial District in Portland, Oregon MPS
- NRHP reference No.: 00000801
- Added to NRHP: July 12, 2000

The Oregon State Bank Building is a former bank building located in northeast Portland, Oregon, and listed on the National Register of Historic Places.

== See also ==
- National Register of Historic Places listings in Northeast Portland, Oregon
