= Virgil and Beulah Crum House =

Historic building in Portland, Oregon, U.S.

- U.S. National Register of Historic Places
- Portland Historic Landmark
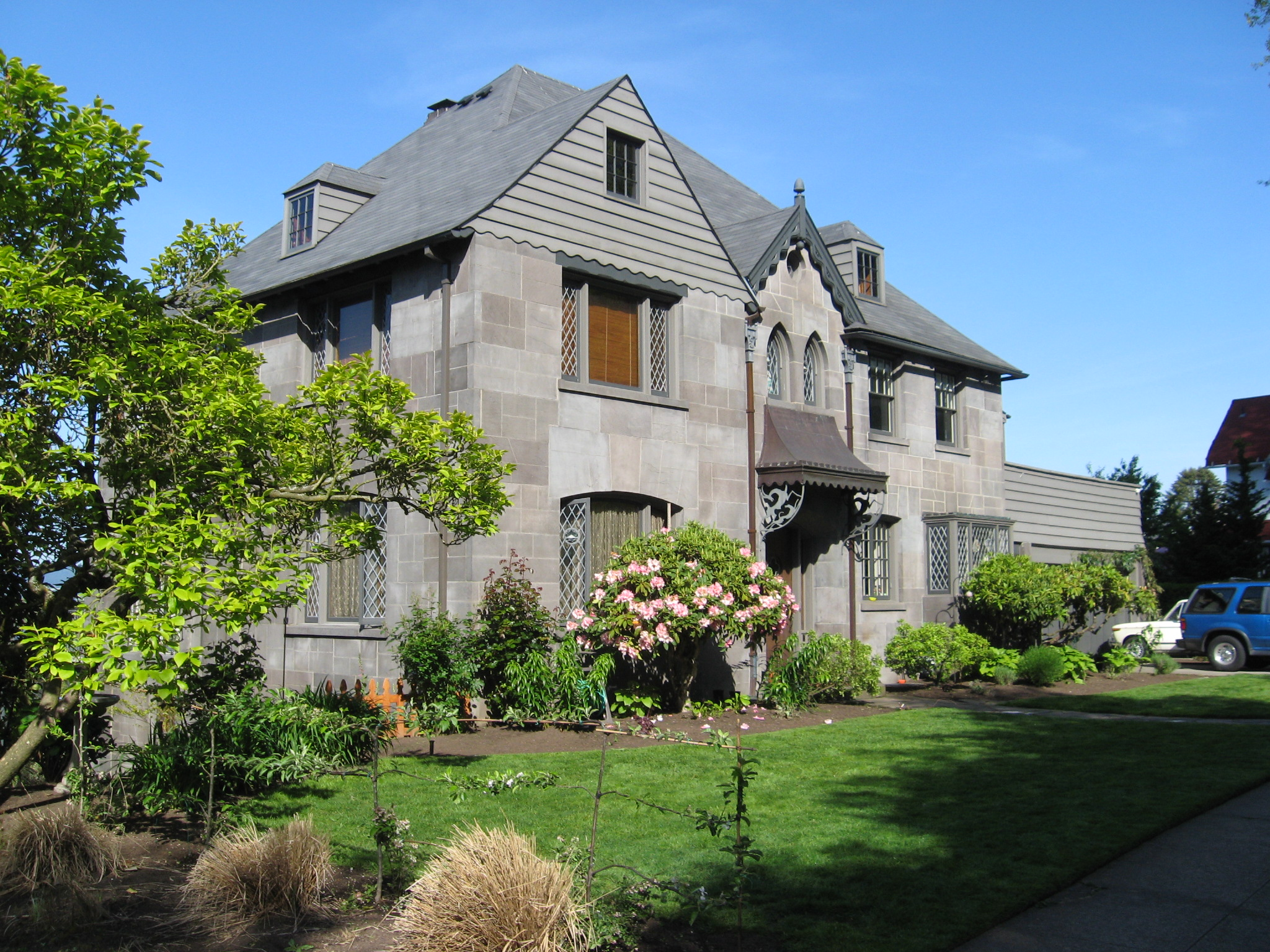
- Virgil and Beulah Crum House in 2009

- Location within Portland, Oregon
- Location: 4438 NE Alameda Street; Portland, Oregon
- Coordinates: 45°32′35″N 122°37′05″W
- Area: 0.3 acres (0.12 ha)
- Built: 1926
- Built by: Walter G. Moore
- Architect: Leigh L. Dougan
- Architectural style: Late 19th And 20th Century Revivals
- NRHP reference No.: 99000944
- Added to NRHP: August 05, 1999

The Virgil and Beulah Crum House is a house located in northeast Portland, Oregon, listed on the National Register of Historic Places.

== See also ==
- National Register of Historic Places listings in Northeast Portland, Oregon
