= Fred O. Miller House =

Historic building in Portland, Oregon, U.S.

- U.S. National Register of Historic Places
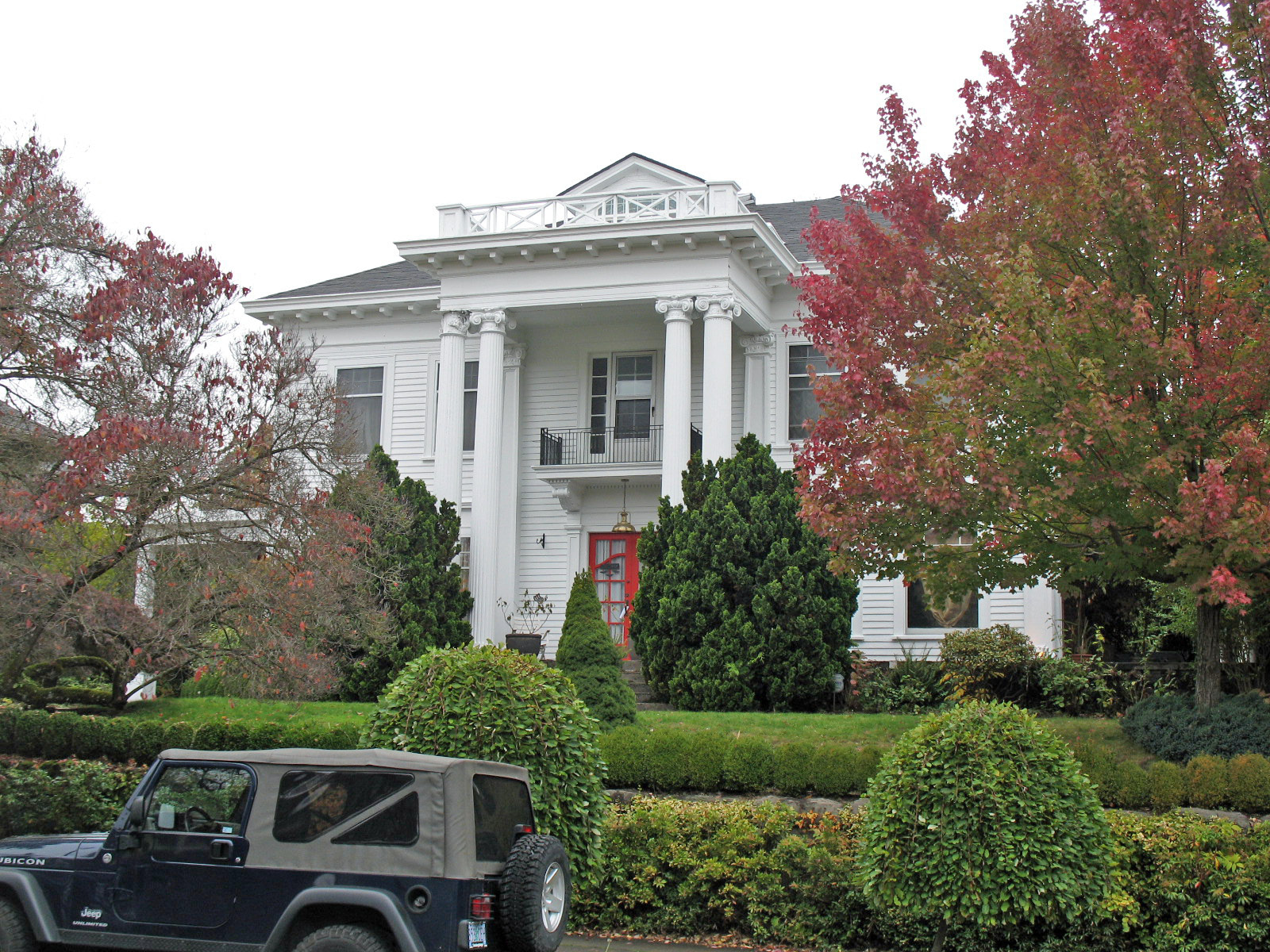

- Location within Portland, Oregon
- Location: 2339 NE Thompson Street; Portland, Oregon
- Coordinates: 45°32′21″N 122°38′29″W
- Area: less than one acre
- Built: 1914
- Architect: Walker, John C.
- Architectural style: Classical Revival
- NRHP reference No.: 05001540
- Added to NRHP: January 18, 2006

The Fred O. Miller House is house located in northeast Portland, Oregon listed on the National Register of Historic Places.

== See also ==
- National Register of Historic Places listings in Northeast Portland, Oregon
