= Mallory Avenue Christian Church =

Historic building in Portland, Oregon, U.S.

- U.S. National Register of Historic Places
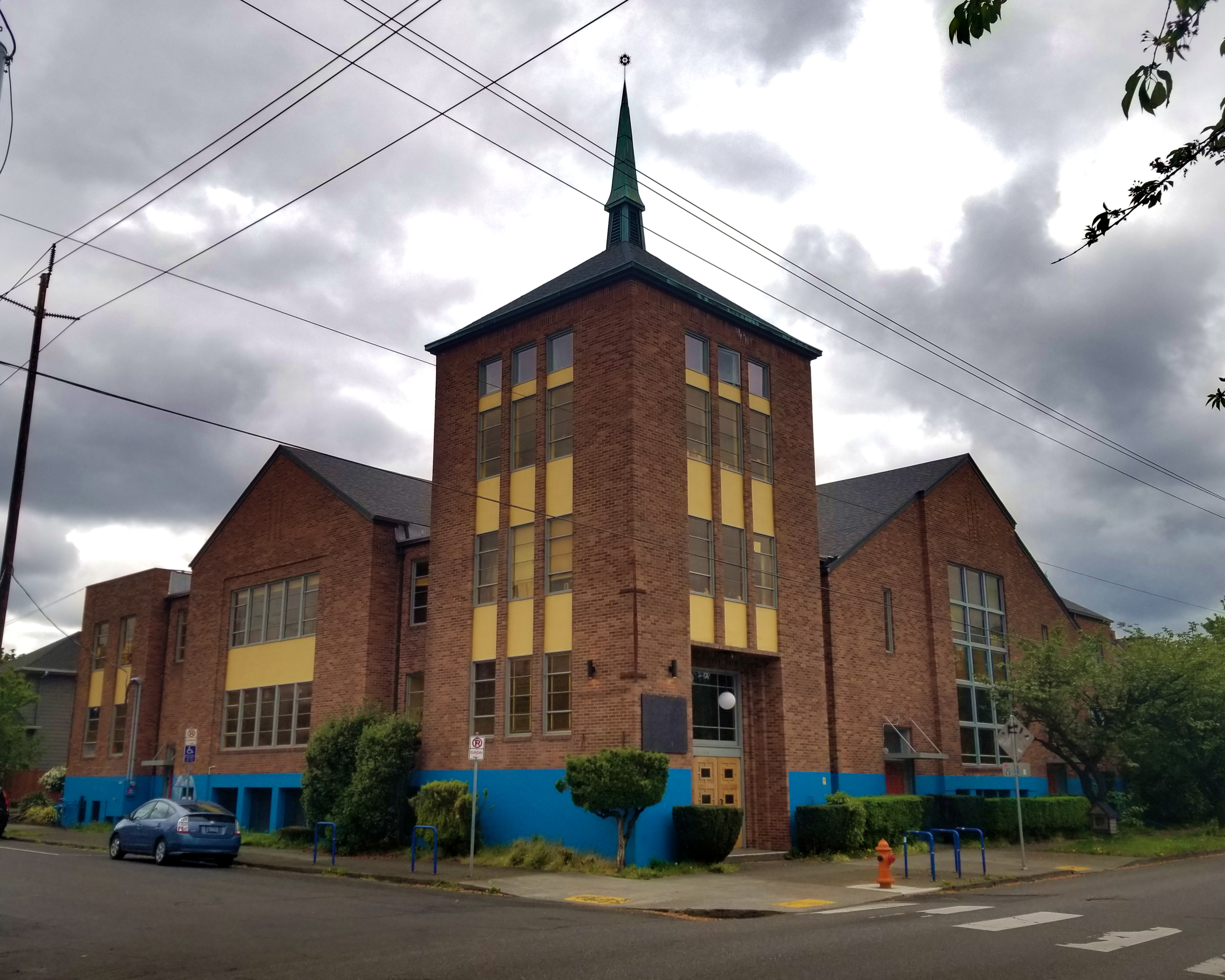

- Location within Portland, Oregon Location within Oregon Location within the United States
- Location: 126 NE Alberta Street; Portland, Oregon
- Coordinates: 45°33′32″N 122°39′50″W
- NRHP reference No.: 100006187
- Added to NRHP: February 25, 2021

The Mallory Avenue Christian Church (also known as Alberta Abbey), located at 126 NE Alberta Street in Portland, Oregon, is listed on the National Register of Historic Places. The structure is also being consider for Portland Historic Landmark status.

== See also ==
- National Register of Historic Places listings in Northeast Portland, Oregon
