= Henry C. Leutgert Building =

Historic building in Portland, Oregon, U.S.

- U.S. National Register of Historic Places
- Portland Historic Landmark
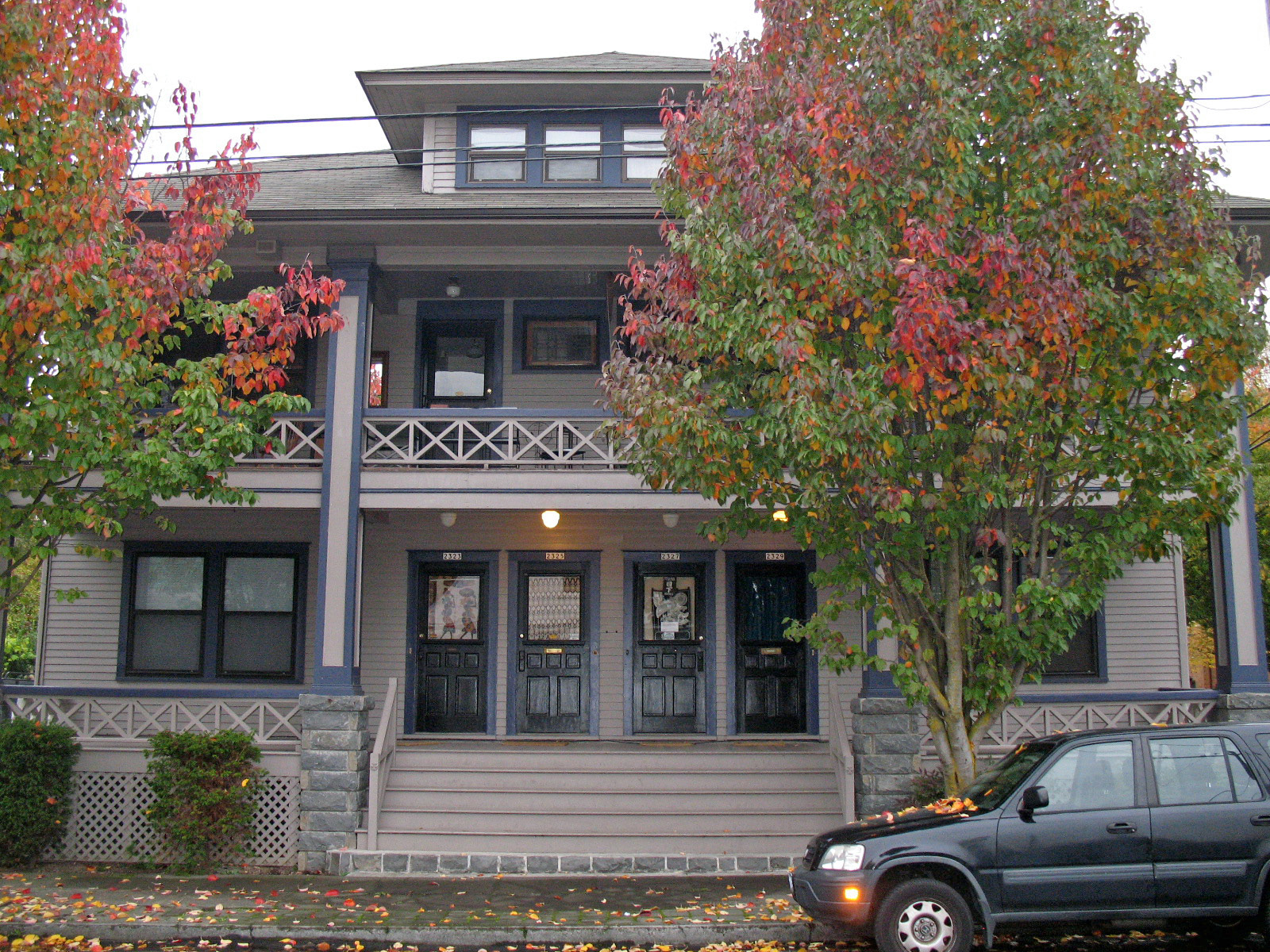

- Location within Portland, Oregon Location within Oregon Location within the United States
- Location: 2323–2329 NE Rodney Avenue; Portland, Oregon
- Coordinates: 45°32′23″N 122°39′52″W
- Area: 0.1 acres (0.040 ha)
- Built: 1912
- Architect: Balgemann, Edwin F.
- Architectural style: Bungalow/craftsman
- MPS: Eliot Neighborhood MPS
- NRHP reference No.: 99000642
- Added to NRHP: May 27, 1999

The Henry C. Leutgert Building is a building located in northeast Portland, Oregon listed on the National Register of Historic Places.

== See also ==
- National Register of Historic Places listings in Northeast Portland, Oregon
