= Fred A., May, and Ann Shogren House =

Historic building in Portland, Oregon, U.S.

- U.S. National Register of Historic Places
- Portland Historic Landmark
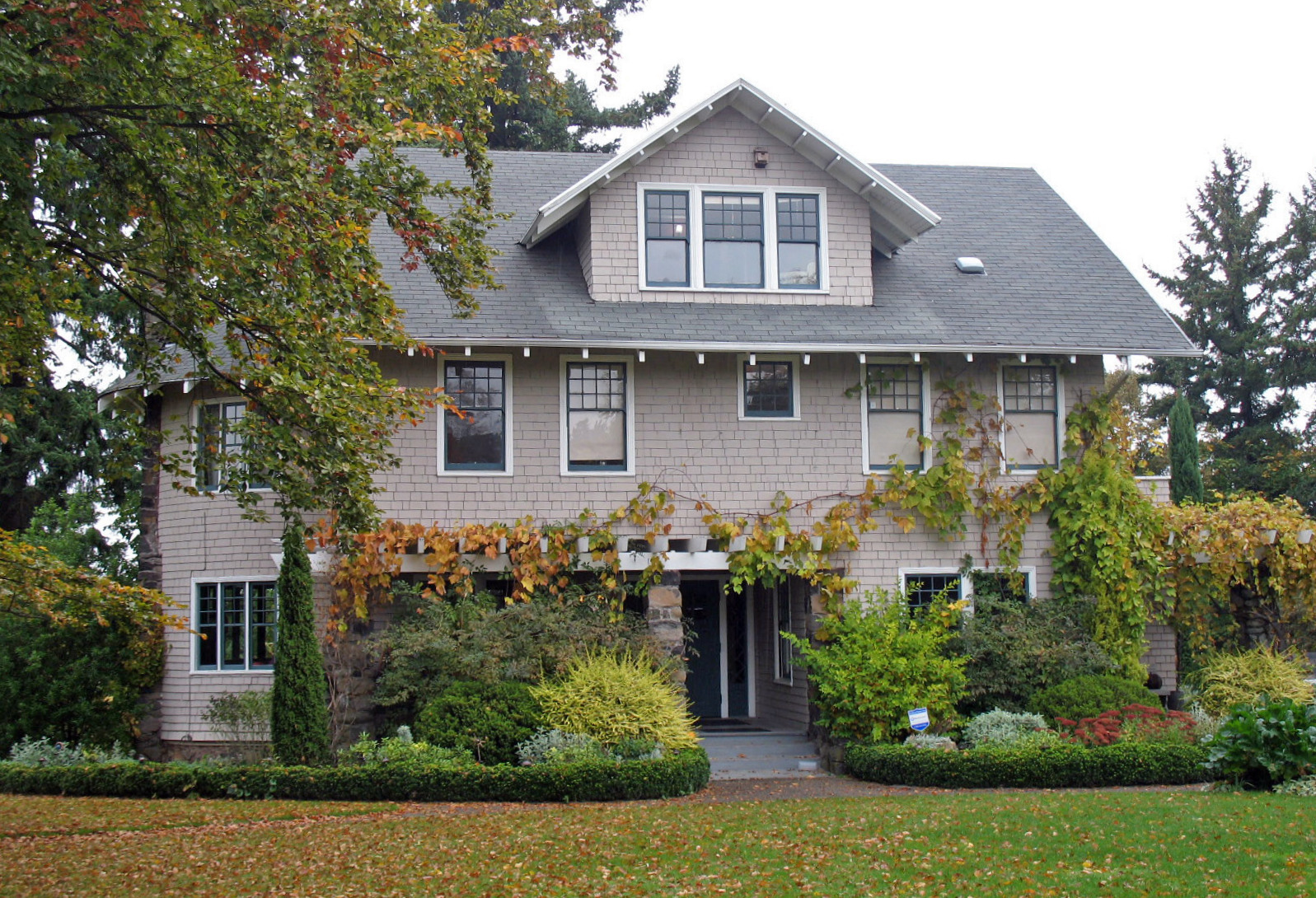
- The house in 2009

- Location within the United States Location within Oregon Location within Portland, Oregon
- Location: 400 NE 62nd Avenue; Portland, Oregon
- Coordinates: 45°31′33″N 122°35′57″W
- Built: c. 1906
- Architect: unknown
- Architectural style: American Craftsman
- NRHP reference No.: 89000517
- Added to NRHP: July 3, 1989

The Fred A., May, and Anne Shogren House is a historic residence in Portland, Oregon, United States. For nearly 30 years, sisters May (1861–1928) and Anne (1868–1934) Shogren were the premier dressmakers and arbiters of women's fashion to the wealthy elite in Portland. They were also successful businesswomen, employing 50 to 100 seamstresses and producing enough surplus to invest in real estate. The sisters lived in this c. 1906 Craftsman house, originally built for their brother Fred, from 1912, through retirement in 1918, and until their deaths. While their shop in downtown Portland is no longer extant, this house serves as the most important remaining site related to their prominent careers. One of their investment properties, the Shogren Building, still exists and is managed by Anne and May's great nephew Andy Munson. The Oregon Historical Society holds their business records and several of their dresses, gowns, and riding habits in its collections.

The house was entered on the National Register of Historic Places in 1989.

== See also ==
- National Register of Historic Places listings in Northeast Portland, Oregon
