= Groat–Gates House =

Historic building in Portland, Oregon, U.S.

- U.S. National Register of Historic Places
- Portland Historic Landmark
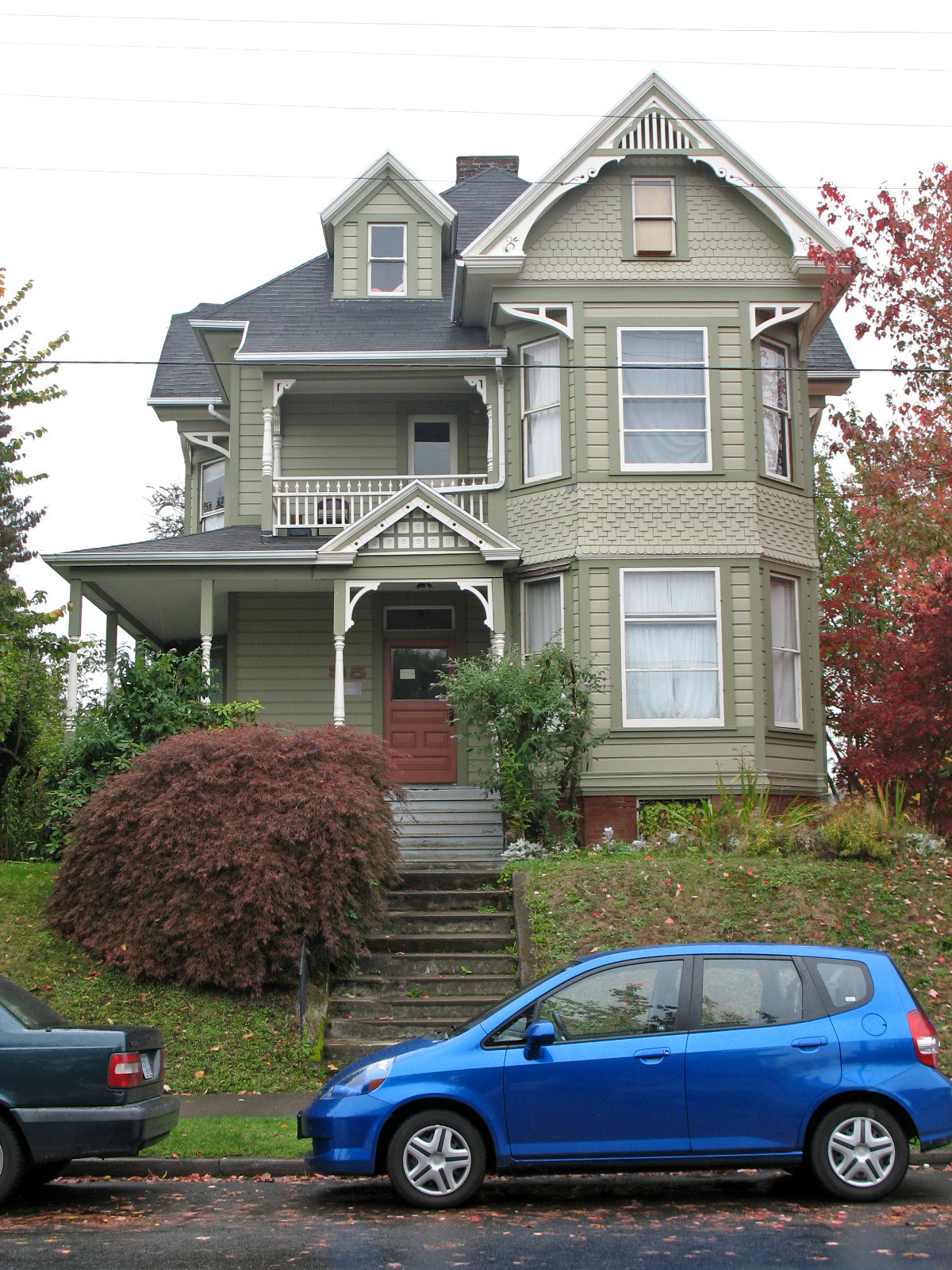

- Location within Portland, Oregon
- Location: 35 NE 22nd Avenue; Portland, Oregon
- Coordinates: 45°31′24″N 122°38′38″W
- Area: 0.1 acres (0.040 ha)
- Built: 1892
- Architectural style: Stick/Eastlake, Queen Anne
- NRHP reference No.: 89000062
- Added to NRHP: February 23, 1989

The Groat–Gates House is a house located in northeast Portland, Oregon listed on the National Register of Historic Places.

== See also ==
- National Register of Historic Places listings in Northeast Portland, Oregon
