= Emerson Apartments =

Historic building in Portland, Oregon, U.S.

- U.S. National Register of Historic Places
- Portland Historic Landmark
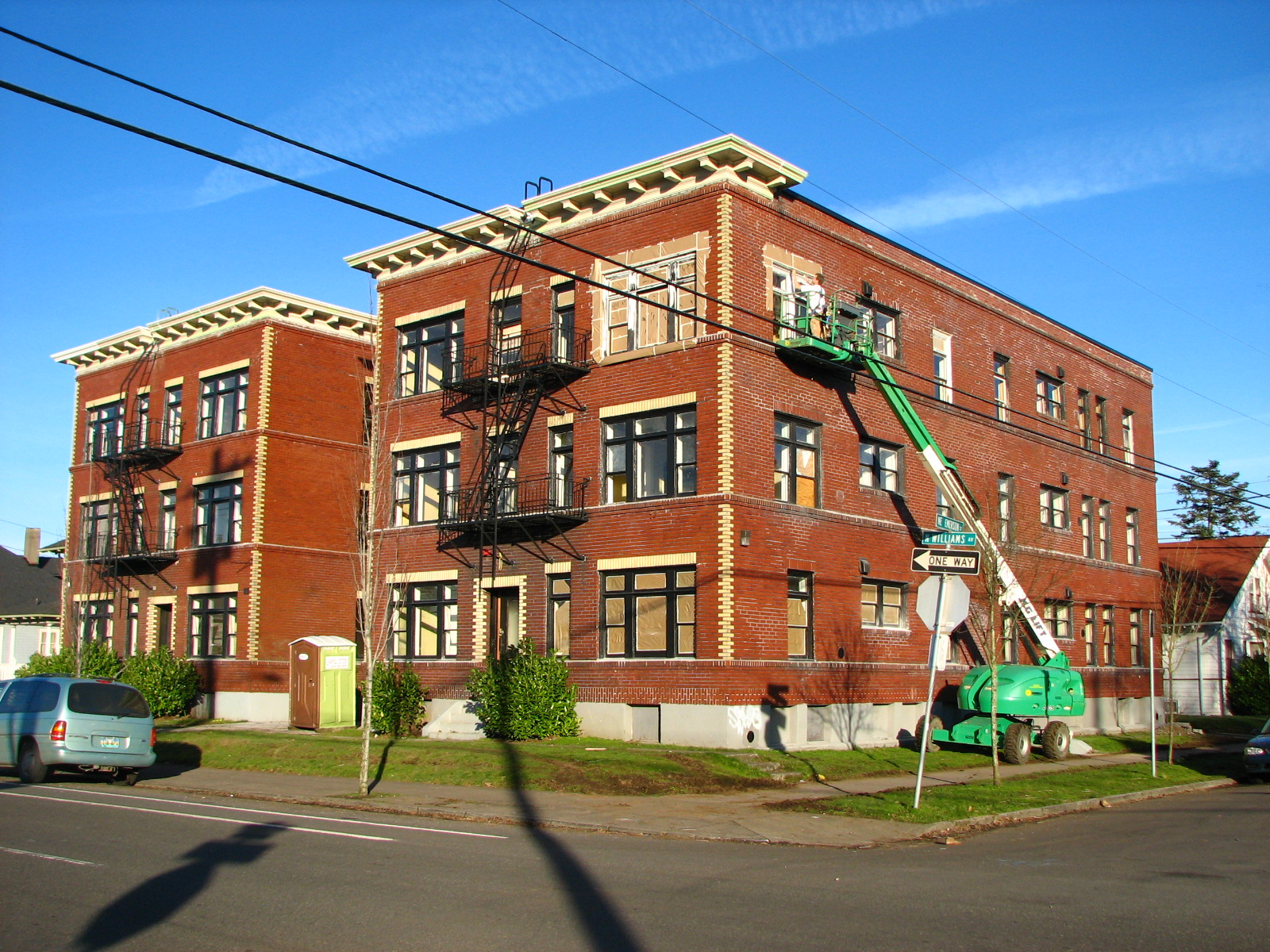
- Emerson Apartments in 2009

- Location within Portland, Oregon
- Location: 5310 N Williams Avenue; Portland, Oregon
- Coordinates: 45°33′43″N 122°40′00″W
- Area: less than one acre
- Built: 1912
- Architect: P. Chappell Browne
- Architectural style: Early Commercial
- NRHP reference No.: 99001714
- Added to NRHP: January 27, 2000

The Emerson Apartments, located in northeast Portland, Oregon, are listed on the National Register of Historic Places.

== See also ==
- National Register of Historic Places listings in Northeast Portland, Oregon
