= August Olson House =

Historic building in Portland, Oregon, U.S.

- U.S. National Register of Historic Places
- Portland Historic Landmark
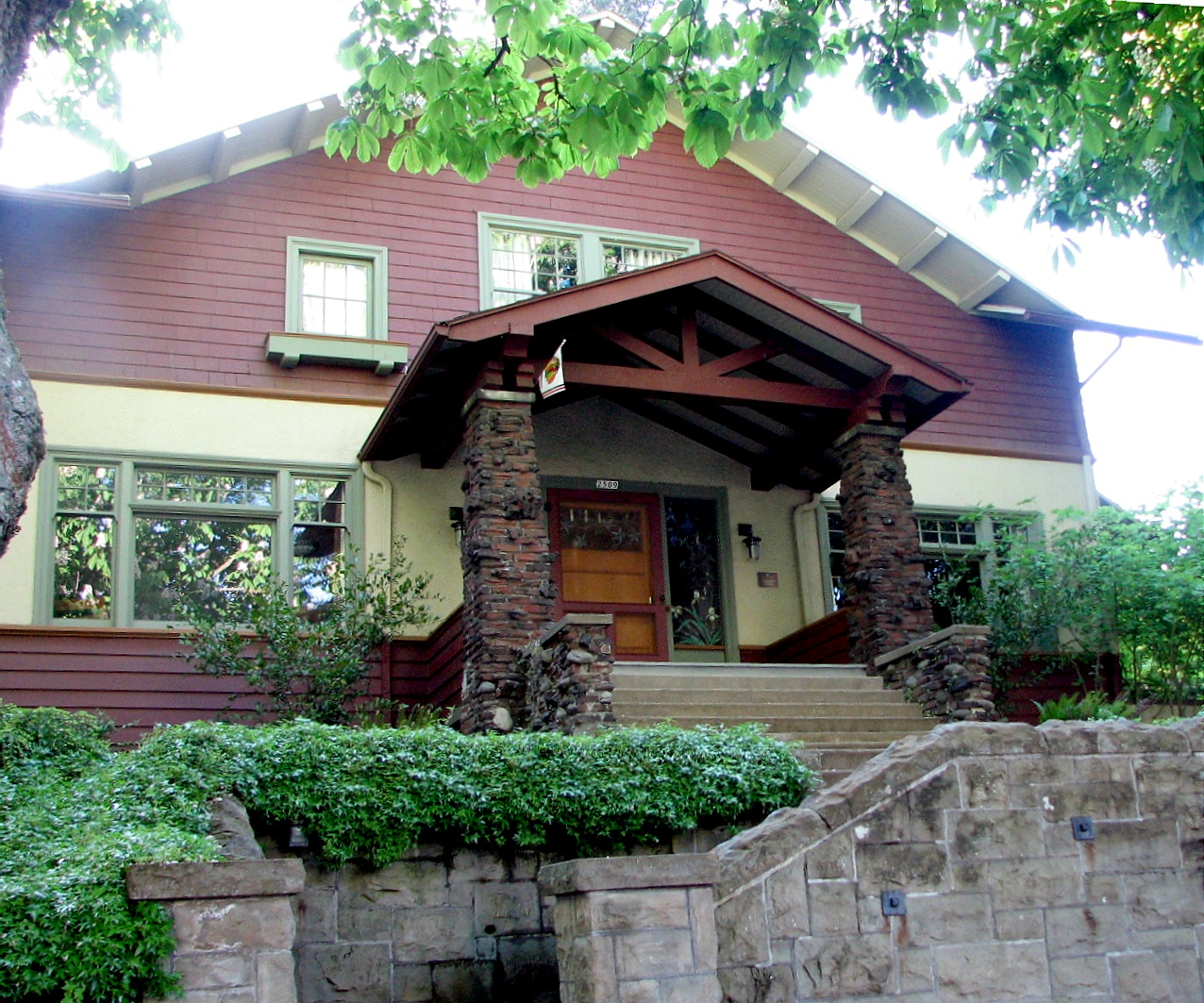

- Location within Portland, Oregon Location within Oregon Location within the United States
- Location: 2509 NE 18th Avenue; Portland, Oregon
- Coordinates: 45°32′27″N 122°38′51″W
- Area: 0.3 acres (0.12 ha)
- Built: 1910
- Architect: Hockenberry, Raymond N.; McHolland Brothers
- Architectural style: Bungalow/craftsman
- NRHP reference No.: 96000624
- Added to NRHP: June 3, 1996

The August Olson House is house located in northeast Portland, Oregon listed on the National Register of Historic Places.

== See also ==
- National Register of Historic Places listings in Northeast Portland, Oregon
