= O. K. Jeffery Aircraft Factory =

Historic building in Portland, Oregon, U.S.

- O.K. Jeffery Aircraft Factory
- U.S. National Register of Historic Places
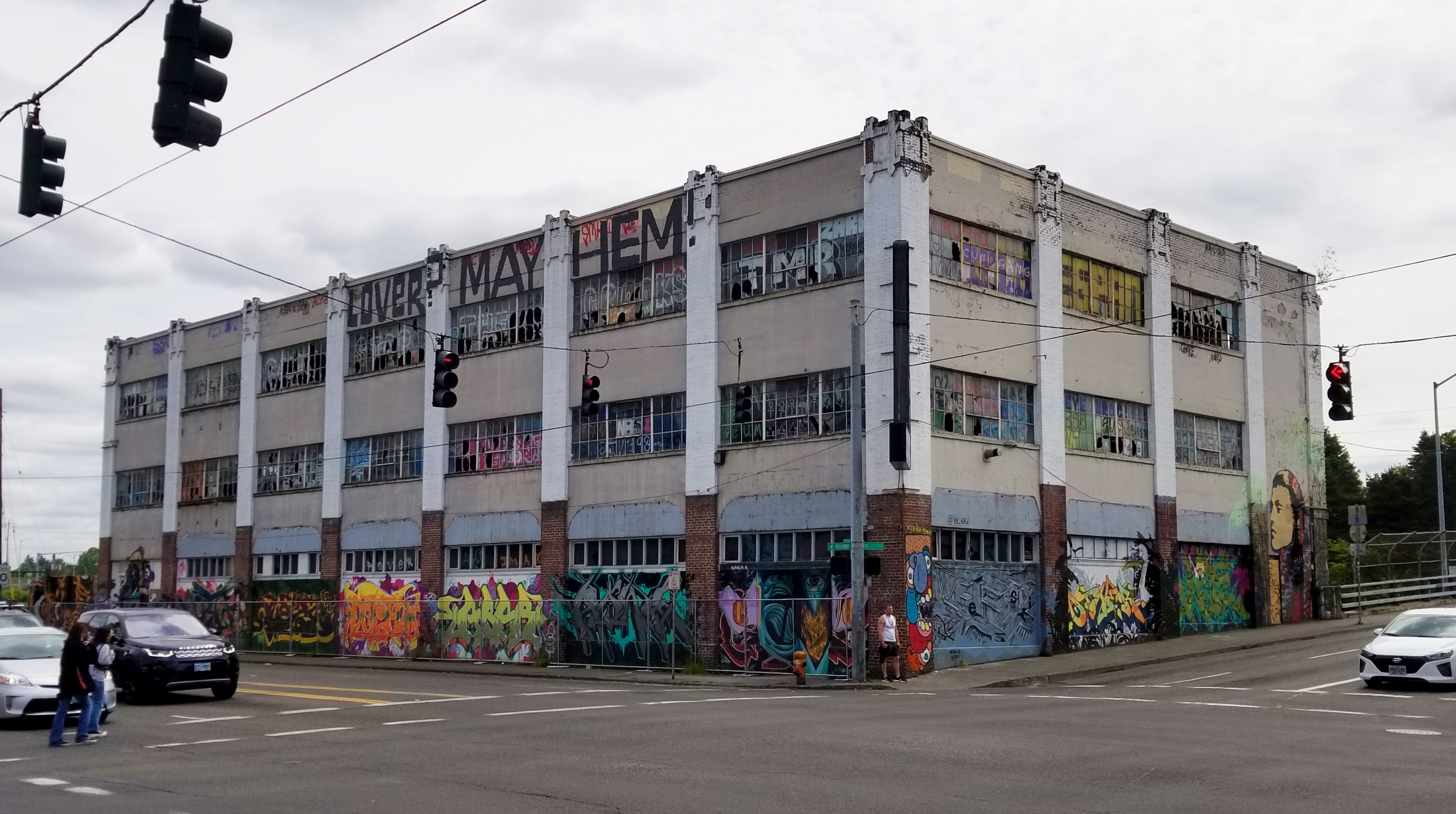

- Location within Portland, Oregon
- Location: 3300 NE Broadway; Portland, Oregon
- Coordinates: 45°32′6″N 122°37′49″W
- Built: 1917
- NRHP reference No.: 100007087
- Added to NRHP: October 18, 2021

The O.K. Jeffery Aircraft Factory is a commercial building located in northeast Portland, Oregon. It is listed on the National Register of Historic Places.

Oliver K. Jeffery built the building for his Oregon Home Builders business in 1915. In 1917–1918, Jeffery was producing wooden aircraft parts in the building for World War I biplanes.

The final tenant, Gordon's Fireplace Shop, moved into the building in 1990 and closed in 2016. Interurban Development bought it in 2017 intending to redevelop it, but it has sat abandoned since then, becoming covered in graffiti. With defaulted loans and liens against the building, the bank foreclosed on the loan, then the City of Portland foreclosed on the building and it went to auction in late 2024, though the auction was postponed.

== See also ==
- National Register of Historic Places listings in Northeast Portland, Oregon
