= Charles E. Johnson Building =

Historic building in Portland, Oregon, U.S.

- U.S. National Register of Historic Places
- Portland Historic Landmark
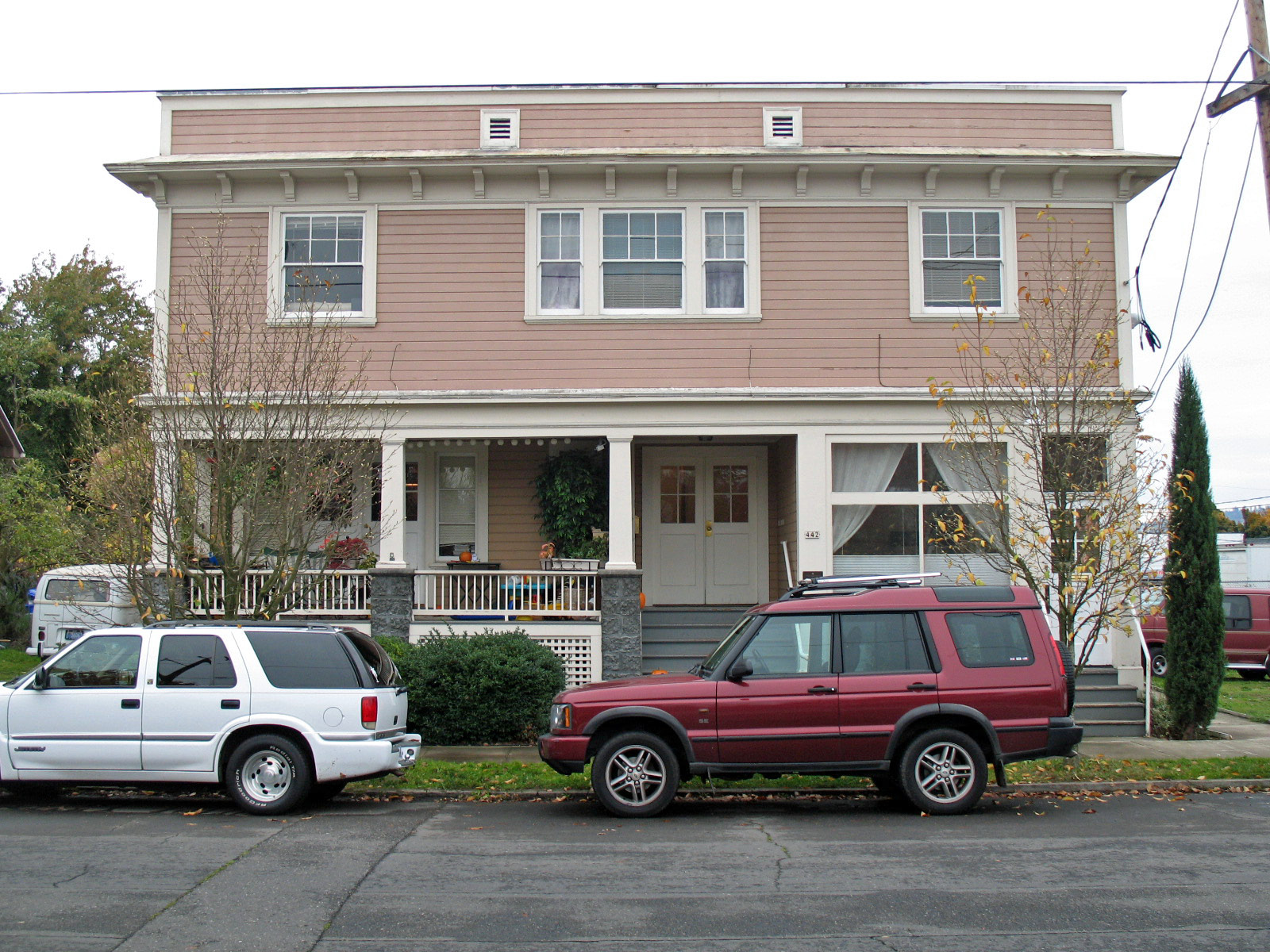

- Location within Portland, Oregon Location within Oregon Location within the United States
- Location: 442 NE Russell Street; Portland, Oregon
- Coordinates: 45°32′28″N 122°39′38″W
- Area: 0.1 acres (0.040 ha)
- Built: 1912
- Built by: Edward J. Grahs
- Architectural style: Early Commercial
- MPS: Eliot Neighborhood MPS
- NRHP reference No.: 99000949
- Added to NRHP: August 5, 1999

The Charles E. Johnson Building is a building located in northeast Portland, Oregon, United States, listed on the National Register of Historic Places.

== See also ==
- National Register of Historic Places listings in Northeast Portland, Oregon
