= Raymond and Catherine Fisher House =

Historic building in Portland, Oregon, U.S.

- U.S. National Register of Historic Places
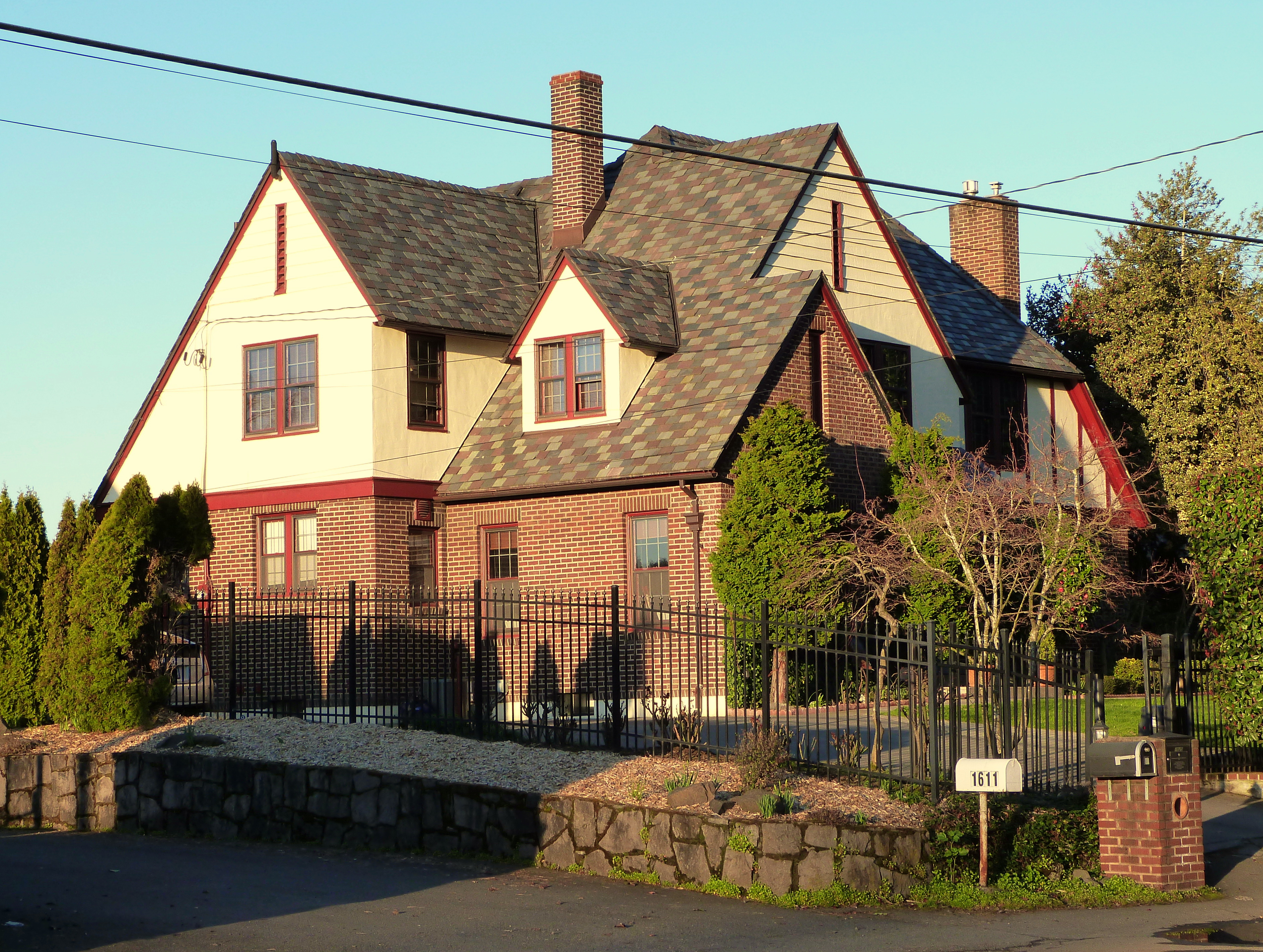
- The Fisher House in 2013.

- Location within Portland, Oregon
- Location: 1625 NE Marine Drive; Portland, Oregon
- Coordinates: 45°36′02″N 122°38′54″W
- Area: 0.6 acres (0.24 ha)
- Built: 1929
- Architect: Ora M. Akers
- Architectural style: Tudor Revival
- NRHP reference No.: 06000096
- Added to NRHP: March 2, 2006

The Raymond and Catherine Fisher House is a house located in northeast Portland, Oregon listed on the National Register of Historic Places.

== See also ==
- National Register of Historic Places listings in Northeast Portland, Oregon
