= Oliver and Margaret Jeffrey House =

Historic building in Portland, Oregon, U.S.

- U.S. National Register of Historic Places
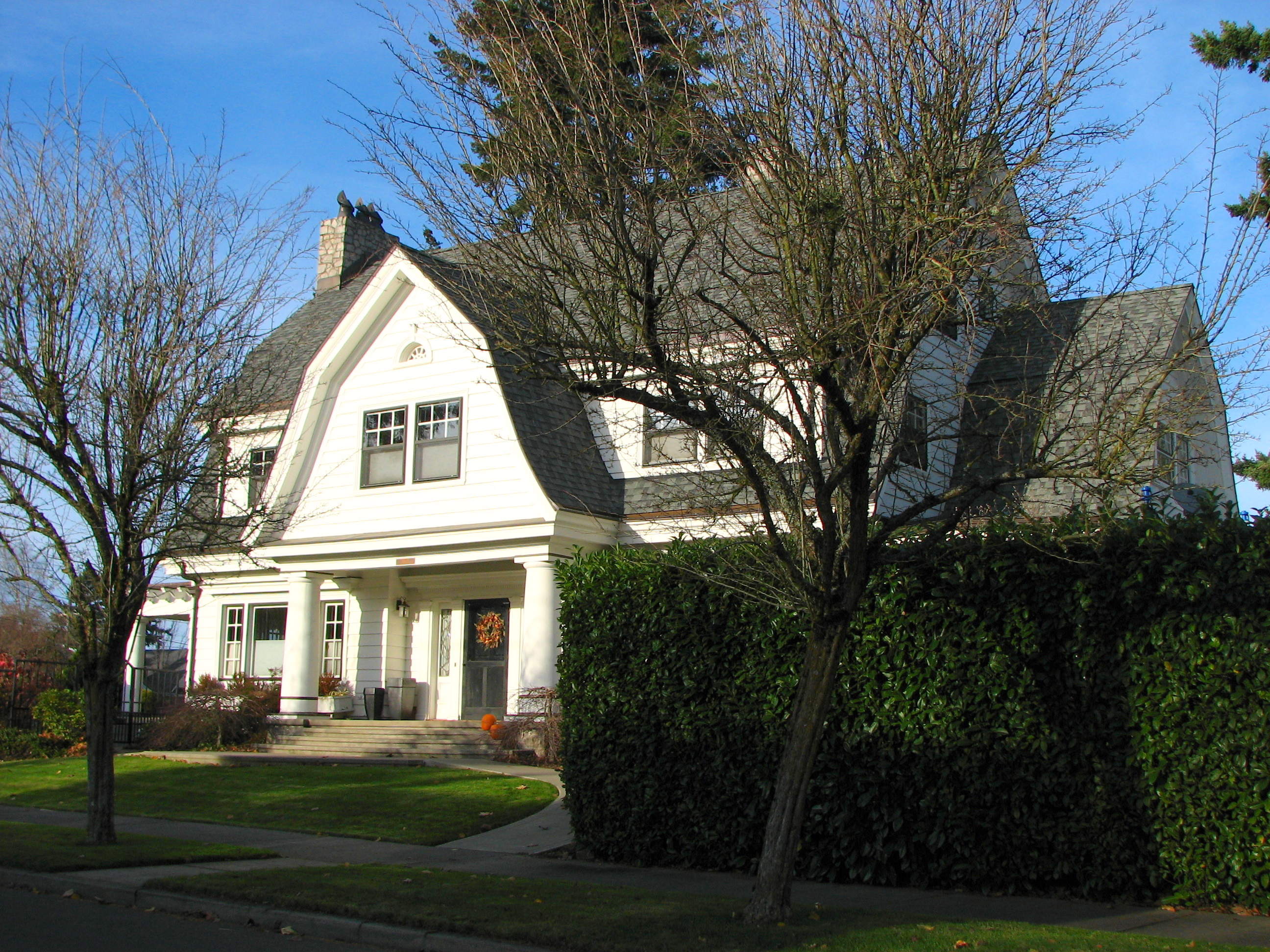

- Location within Portland, Oregon
- Location: 3033 NE Bryce Street; Portland, Oregon
- Coordinates: 45°33′06″N 122°38′04″W
- Area: less than one acre
- Built: 1916
- Built by: Oregon Home Builders
- Architect: George Eastman
- Architectural style: Colonial Revival
- NRHP reference No.: 05001059
- Added to NRHP: September 21, 2005

The Oliver and Margaret Jeffrey House is a house located in northeast Portland, Oregon listed on the National Register of Historic Places.

== See also ==
- National Register of Historic Places listings in Northeast Portland, Oregon
