= Del Rey Apartments =

Historic building in Portland, Oregon, U.S.

- U.S. National Register of Historic Places
- Portland Historic Landmark
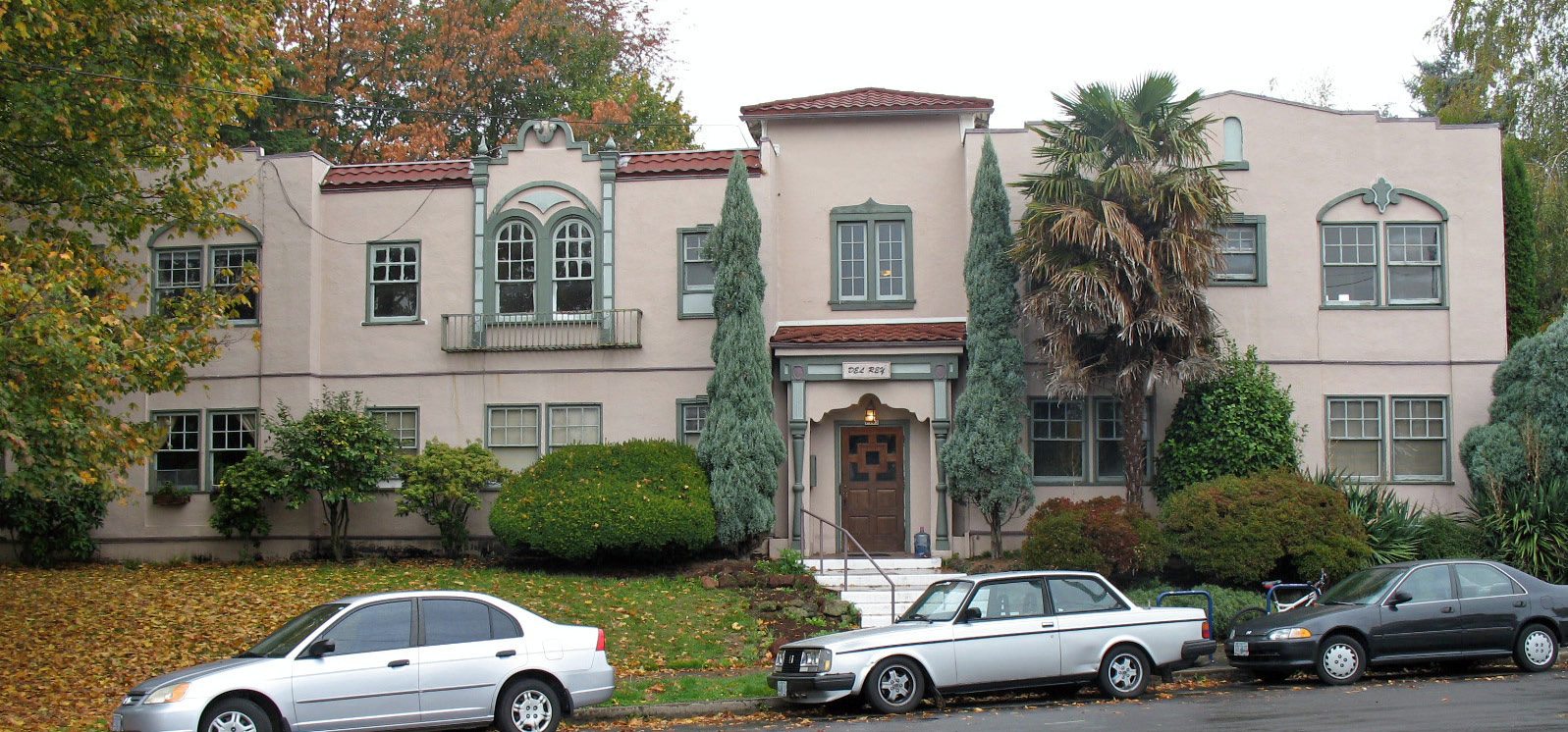
- Del Rey Apartments in 2009

- Location within Portland, Oregon Location within Oregon Location within the United States
- Location: 2555 NE Glisan Street; Portland, Oregon
- Coordinates: 45°31′37″N 122°38′22″W
- Area: 0.5 acres (0.20 ha)
- Built: 1925
- Architect: Eric Rasmussen, Lee Hawley Hoffman
- Architectural style: Late 19th And 20th Century Revivals, Spanish Colonial Revival
- NRHP reference No.: 91000040
- Added to NRHP: February 20, 1991

The Del Rey Apartments, located in northeast Portland, Oregon, are listed on the National Register of Historic Places.

== See also ==
- National Register of Historic Places listings in Northeast Portland, Oregon
