= McAvinney Fourplex =

Historic building in Portland, Oregon, U.S.

- U.S. National Register of Historic Places
- U.S. Historic district – Contributing property
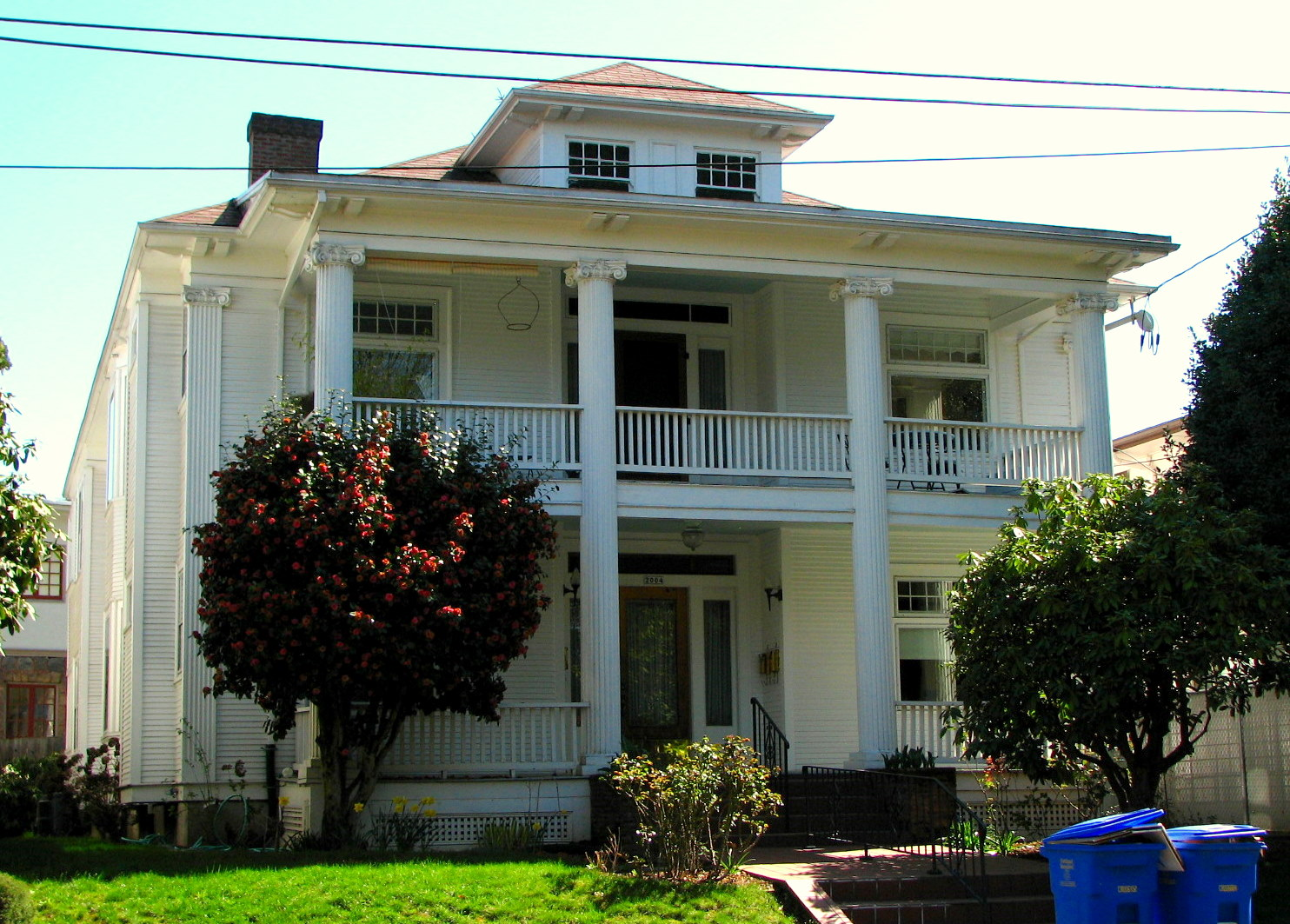
- The building's exterior in 2009
- Location: 2004 NE 17th Avenue; Portland, Oregon
- Coordinates: 45°32′13″N 122°38′53″W
- Area: Less than 1 acre (0.40 ha)
- Built: 1913
- Built by: L. R. Bailey & Co.
- Architect: Luther R. Bailey
- Architectural style: Classical Revival
- Part of: Irvington Historic District (ID10000850)
- NRHP reference No.: 05001147
- Added to NRHP: February 6, 2006

The McAvinney Fourplex is a historic apartment building located in the northeast quadrant of Portland, Oregon, United States. It was listed on the National Register of Historic Places in 2006.

== See also ==
- National Register of Historic Places listings in Northeast Portland, Oregon
