= Roome–Stearns House =

- U.S. National Register of Historic Places
- U.S. Historic district – Contributing property
- Portland Historic Landmark
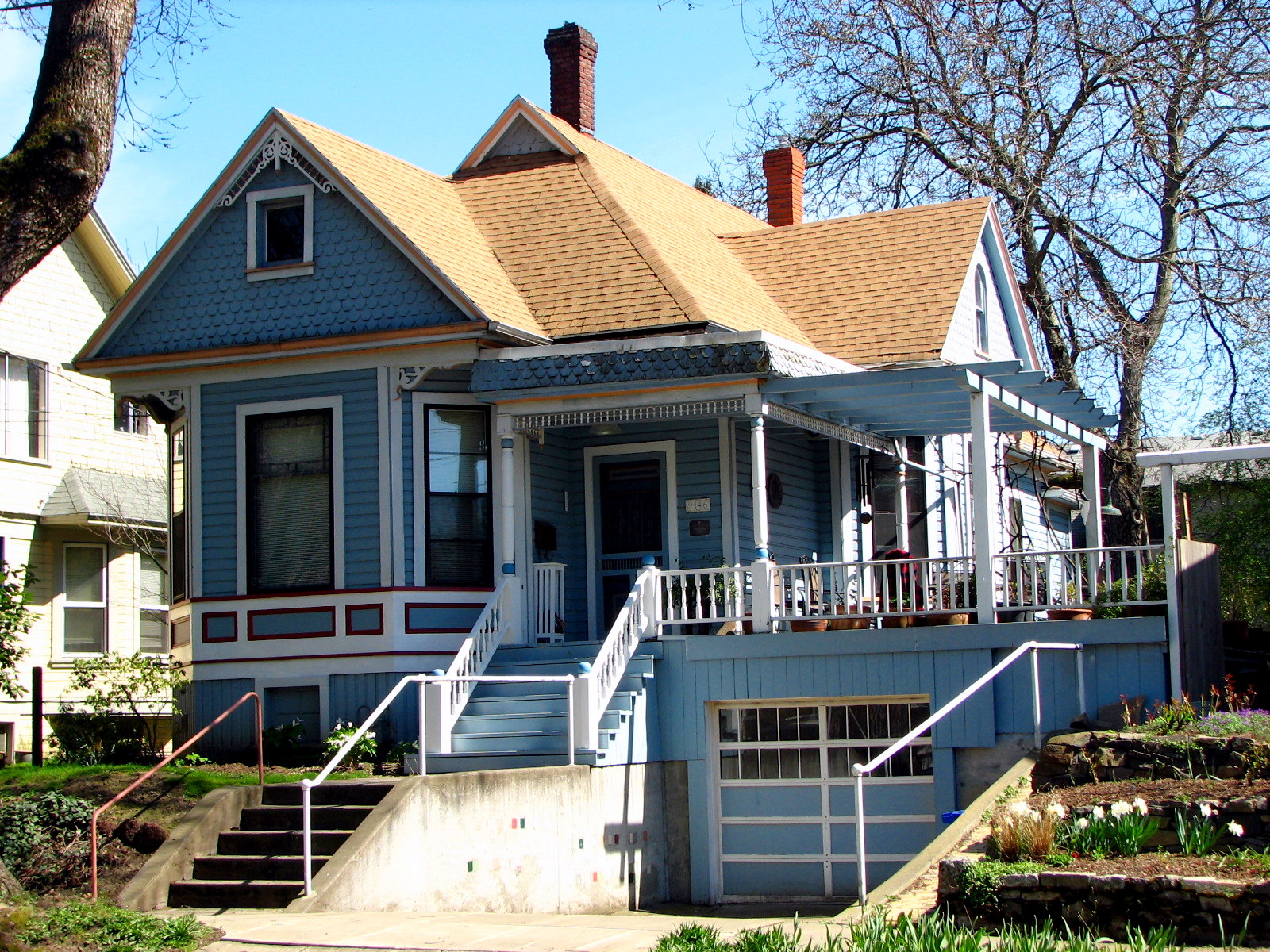
- The house in 2009

- Location within the United States Location within Oregon Location within Portland, Oregon
- Location: 2146 NE 12th Avenue; Portland, Oregon
- Coordinates: 45°32′17″N 122°39′11″W
- Built: 1893
- Built by: Portland Cottage Building Association
- Architectural style: Queen Anne cottage
- Part of: Irvington Historic District (ID10000850)
- NRHP reference No.: 92000087
- Added to NRHP: March 9, 1992

The Roome–Stearns House is a historic building in Portland, Oregon, United States. It is the best and most unaltered remaining example of a modest, cottage-scale Queen Anne house in the Irvington neighborhood, exhibiting elegant Eastlake details on the interior. It was built in 1893 by the Portland Cottage Building Association, a short-lived company that developed several cottage-type homes in the area, leaving its imprint on west Irvington.

The house was entered on the National Register of Historic Places in 1992.

== See also ==
- National Register of Historic Places listings in Northeast Portland, Oregon
