= Irvington Bowman Apartments =

Historic building complex in Portland, Oregon, U.S.

- U.S. National Register of Historic Places
- Portland Historic Landmark
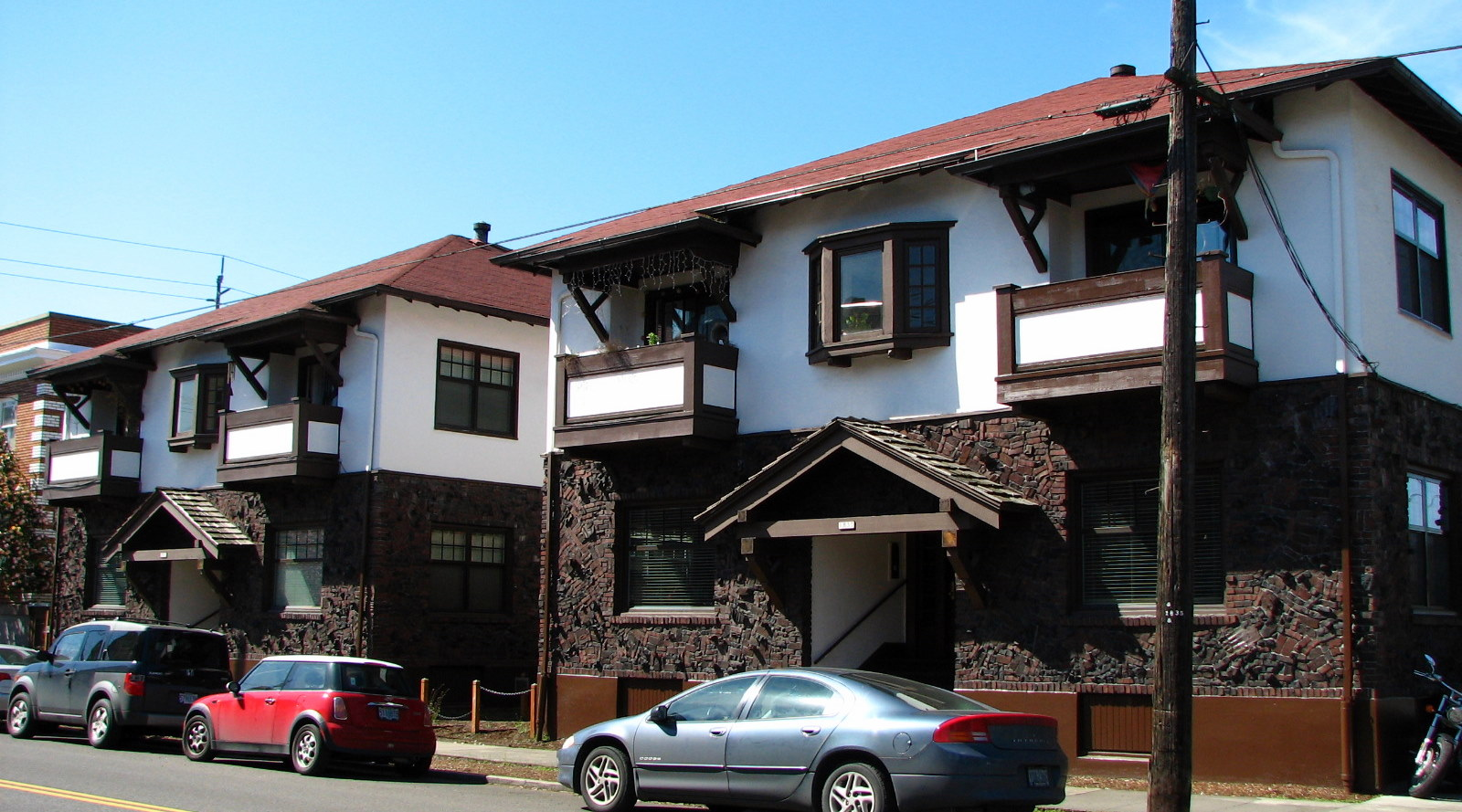

- Location within Portland, Oregon Location within Oregon Location within the United States
- Location: 1825–1835 NE 16th Avenue; Portland, Oregon
- Coordinates: 45°32′10″N 122°38′59″W
- Area: less than one acre
- Built: 1912
- Architect: Bowman, Frederic E.
- Architectural style: Bungalow/craftsman
- NRHP reference No.: 02000968
- Added to NRHP: September 14, 2002

The Irvington Bowman Apartments is an apartment complex located in northeast Portland, Oregon listed on the National Register of Historic Places.

== See also ==
- National Register of Historic Places listings in Northeast Portland, Oregon
