= National Register of Historic Places listings in Northwest Portland, Oregon =

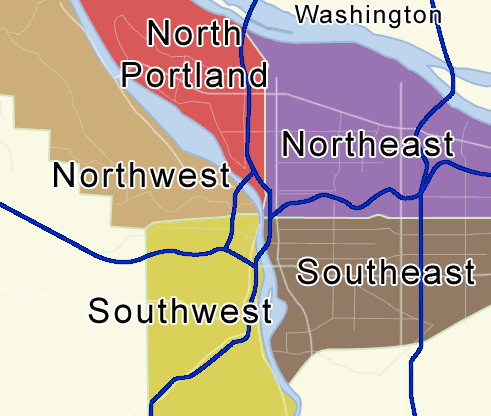
Locator map showing five of Portland's six quadrants. Click a quadrant to go to its National Register list. (South Portland listings are included on the Southwest Portland list.)

This list presents the full set of buildings, structures, objects, sites, or districts designated on the National Register of Historic Places in Northwest Portland, Oregon, United States, and offers brief descriptive information about each of them. The National Register recognizes places of national, state, or local historic significance across the United States. Out of over 90,000 National Register sites nationwide, Oregon is home to over 2,000, and over one-fourth of those are found partially or wholly in Portland. While these sites are widely spread across all six of Portland's quadrants, heavy concentrations are found in the Downtown and Southwest Hills neighborhoods of the Southwest quadrant, and the Northwest District neighborhood of the Northwest quadrant.

Only historic places within the municipal boundaries of Portland are shown in this list and its four companion lists for the other quadrants. Some sites beyond city limits will appear in other lists showing "Portland" as a general locality, but are excluded here. Although Portland's legal boundaries extend into Clackamas and Washington counties, all of the city's National Register sites lie within Multnomah County.

This National Park Service list is complete through NPS recent listings posted September 25, 2026.

== Current listings ==
| | Name on the Register | Image | Date listed | Location | Description |
|---|---|---|---|---|---|
| 1 | Charles F. Adams House | Charles F. Adams House | December 9, 1981 (#81000513) | 2363 NW Flanders Street; 45°31′33″N 122°41′59″W | Charles Francis Adams (1862–1943) was a prominent Portland banker, art collector, and patron of the Portland Art Museum. This house was designed for him by the eminent firm of Whidden and Lewis, built in the Georgian Revival style in 1904, expanded in 1918, and extensively restored in 1979. Adams lived there for 39 years until his death. |
| 2 | Albers Brothers Milling Company | Albers Brothers Milling Company | November 15, 1984 (#84000480) | 1118–1130 NW Front Avenue; 45°31′52″N 122°40′34″W | In the early decades of the 20th century, the German-immigrant Albers brothers built the largest flour and feed milling enterprise on the West Coast, headquartered in Portland and comprising operations in four states. This combined milling, warehousing, shipping, and office facility, built in 1909–11, is the oldest remaining flour or feed mill in the city. |
| 3 | Alphabet Historic District | Alphabet Historic District | November 16, 2000 (#00001293) | Roughly bounded by NW Lovejoy and Marshall Streets, NW 17th Avenue, W Burnside Street, and NW 24th Avenue; 45°31′36″N 122°41′42″W | |
| 4 | American Apartment Building | American Apartment Building | May 27, 1993 (#93000452) | 2083 NW Johnson Street; 45°31′43″N 122°41′39″W | The 5-story commercial-type building designed by William B. Bell was built in 1911. It is also known as American Ballparc Condominium. Its siding consists of brick and concrete. |
| 5 | American Can Company Complex | American Can Company Complex | September 12, 1996 (#96000996) | 2127 NW 26th Avenue; 45°32′17″N 122°42′21″W | |
| 6 | Mark A. M. Ashley House | Mark A. M. Ashley House | March 2, 1979 (#79002126) | 2847 NW Westover Road; 45°31′55″N 122°42′32″W | |
| 7 | W. B. Ayer House | W. B. Ayer House | February 22, 1991 (#91000144) | 811 NW 19th Avenue; 45°31′43″N 122°41′28″W | |
| 8 | Ayer–Shea House | Ayer–Shea House | June 14, 1982 (#82003741) | 1809 NW Johnson Street; 45°31′44″N 122°41′23″W | |
| 9 | Balch Gulch Bridge | Balch Gulch Bridge | September 23, 2025 (#100012332) | 3010 NW Thurman Street; 45°32′08″N 122°42′45″W | Also known as the Thurman Street Bridge. |
| 10 | Ballou & Wright Company Building | Ballou & Wright Company Building | April 30, 1987 (#87000698) | 327 NW 10th Avenue; 45°31′32″N 122°40′54″W | |
| 11 | Bates–Seller House | Bates–Seller House | August 29, 1979 (#79002127) | 2381 NW Flanders Street; 45°31′33″N 122°42′01″W | |
| 12 | Christine Becker House | Christine Becker House | February 28, 1991 (#91000142) | 1331 NW 25th Avenue; 45°31′57″N 122°42′11″W | |
| 13 | Belle Court Apartments | Belle Court Apartments | November 6, 1986 (#86002966) | 120 NW Trinity Place; 45°31′26″N 122°41′28″W | |
| 14 | Joseph Bergman House | Joseph Bergman House | September 1, 1983 (#83002168) | 2134 NW Hoyt Street; 45°31′37″N 122°41′43″W | |
| 15 | Biltmore Apartments | Biltmore Apartments | February 20, 1991 (#91000041) | 2014 NW Glisan Street; 45°31′34″N 122°41′34″W | |
| 16 | J. C. Braly House | J. C. Braly House | February 28, 1991 (#91000132) | 2846 NW Fairfax Terrace; 45°31′53″N 122°42′35″W | |
| 17 | Bretnor Apartments | Bretnor Apartments | February 20, 1991 (#91000067) | 931 NW 20th Avenue; 45°31′47″N 122°41′34″W | |
| 18 | Broadway Bridge | Broadway Bridge | November 14, 2012 (#12000930) | Spanning the Willamette River at river mile 11.7; 45°31′55″N 122°40′26″W | This is the largest example of a Rall-type bascule bridge ever constructed, and one of only three such designs still extant in the United States. Completed in 1913, it was an important step in the development of Portland's transportation system, as the city's first Willamette River bridge built on an entirely new alignment in the 20th century. |
| 19 | Broadway Hotel | Broadway Hotel | September 9, 1993 (#93000927) | 10 NW Broadway; 45°31′24″N 122°40′38″W | |
| 20 | Buck Apartment Building | Buck Apartment Building | October 25, 1990 (#90001594) | 415 NW 21st Avenue; 45°31′33″N 122°41′41″W | |
| 21 | Burke–Clark House | Burke–Clark House | August 26, 1982 (#82003742) | 2610 NW Cornell Road; 45°31′47″N 122°42′18″W | |
| 22 | Burkes-Belluschi House | Burkes-Belluschi House | February 7, 2025 (#100011447) | 700 NW Rapidan Terrace; 45°31′42″N 122°42′34″W | |
| 23 | Burnside Bridge | Burnside Bridge | November 14, 2012 (#12000931) | Spanning the Willamette River at river mile 12.7; 45°31′23″N 122°40′03″W | Opened in 1926 as a centerpiece of Portland's transportation system, the Burnside Bridge was embroiled in a public corruption scandal during its development. Part of a three-bridge package funded by a public bond issue, it was one of the final works in bridge engineer Gustav Lindenthal's impressive career. (Note: The three bridges in the bond-funded package were the Burnside Bridge, Ross Island Bridge, and Sellwood Bridge (which has since been demolished and replaced). Lindenthal was the supervising engineer for the construction of all three bridges. He was responsible for the design of the Ross Island and Sellwood bridges, but for the Burnside Bridge he adapted a design by Ira G. Hedrick and Robert E. Kremers. Hedrick and Kremers were removed from the project due to the corruption scandal.) It is one of the country's heaviest bascule bridges, and the earliest to use a concrete deck on the lift span. |
| 24 | Campbell Hotel | Campbell Hotel | February 22, 1988 (#88000098) | 530 NW 23rd Avenue; 45°31′36″N 122°41′54″W | |
| 25 | Campbell Townhouses | Campbell Townhouses | February 12, 1980 (#80003360) | 1705–1719 NW Irving Street; 715–719 NW 17th Avenue; 45°31′41″N 122°41′19″W | |
| 26 | Cardwell–Holman House | Cardwell–Holman House | September 21, 2005 (#05001057) | 827 NW 25th Avenue; 45°31′56″N 122°42′00″W | |
| 27 | Clarke–Mossman House | Clarke–Mossman House | December 6, 2002 (#02001484) | 1625 NW 29th Avenue; 45°32′03″N 122°42′40″W | |
| 28 | Cohn–Sichel House | Cohn–Sichel House | February 28, 2008 (#08000119) | 2205 NW Johnson Street; 45°31′43″N 122°41′48″W | |
| 29 | Couch Family Investment Development | Couch Family Investment Development | February 25, 1980 (#80003362) | 1721–1735 NW Irving Street and 718 NW 18th Avenue; 45°31′41″N 122°41′21″W | |
| 30 | Darcelle XV | Darcelle XV | November 2, 2020 (#100005723) | 208 NW 3rd Ave. 45°31′29″N 122°40′24″W | |
| 31 | Day Building | Day Building | October 2, 1978 (#78002310) | 2068 NW Flanders Street; 45°31′31″N 122°41′38″W | |
| 32 | Dayton Apartment Building | Dayton Apartment Building | December 21, 1981 (#81000515) | 2056–2058 NW Flanders Street; 45°31′31″N 122°41′37″W | |
| 33 | Arthur H. Devers House | Arthur H. Devers House | February 2, 2026 (#100012726) | 1125 NW 21st Avenue; 45°31′52″N 122°41′41″W | |
| 34 | Frank E. Dooly House | Frank E. Dooly House | October 24, 1980 (#80003364) | 2670 NW Lovejoy Street; 45°31′45″N 122°42′21″W | |
| 35 | Henry E. Dosch Investment Property | Henry E. Dosch Investment Property | June 4, 1987 (#87000886) | 425 NW 18th Avenue; 45°31′34″N 122°41′23″W | |
| 36 | Elizabeth Ducey House | Elizabeth Ducey House | June 1, 1990 (#90000839) | 2773 NW Westover Road; 45°31′51″N 122°42′27″W | |
| 37 | Eastman–Shaver House | Eastman–Shaver House | July 9, 1985 (#85001528) | 2645 NW Beuhla Vista Terrace; 45°31′32″N 122°42′18″W | |
| 38 | Eugene Apartments | Eugene Apartments | August 26, 1994 (#94001023) | 2030 NW Flanders Street; 45°31′31″N 122°41′35″W | |
| 39 | Fairmount Hotel | Fairmount Hotel | May 5, 2000 (#00000448) | 1908–1932 NW 26th Avenue; 45°32′11″N 122°42′17″W | |
| 40 | First Church of Christ, Scientist | First Church of Christ, Scientist | October 2, 1978 (#78002314) | 1819 NW Everett Street; 45°31′31″N 122°41′23″W | |
| 41 | First Regiment Armory Annex | First Regiment Armory Annex | August 31, 2000 (#00001017) | 128 NW 11th Avenue; 45°31′27″N 122°40′54″W | Built in 1888 in reaction to anti-Chinese riots along the West Coast, to provide drilling space for the National Guard, this extension to the Portland armory evolved into a de facto cultural center hosting opera, early movies, political events, boxing, concerts, and other events. After standing abandoned for decades, it reopened as a theater in 2006. |
| 42 | G. G. Gerber Building | G. G. Gerber Building | September 6, 2007 (#07000922) | 210 NW 11th Avenue; 45°31′29″N 122°40′55″W | |
| 43 | Golden West Hotel | Golden West Hotel | February 22, 2022 (#100007456) | 707 NW Everett St. 45°31′31″N 122°40′40″W | |
| 44 | Bernard and Emma Goldsmith House | Bernard and Emma Goldsmith House | October 25, 2018 (#100003054) | 1507 NW 24th Avenue; 45°32′01″N 122°42′04″W | |
| 45 | Joseph Goodman House | Joseph Goodman House | May 27, 1993 (#93000455) | 240 NW 20th Avenue; 45°31′29″N 122°41′31″W | |
| 46 | Henry M. Grant House | Henry M. Grant House | February 22, 1991 (#91000148) | 3114 NW Thurman Street; 45°32′08″N 122°42′51″W | |
| 47 | Henry Hahn House | Henry Hahn House | September 9, 1993 (#93000918) | 2636 NW Cornell Road; 45°31′49″N 122°42′21″W | |
| 48 | Hazel Hall House | Hazel Hall House | June 19, 1991 (#91000813) | 104–106 NW 22nd Place; 45°31′26″N 122°41′50″W | |
| 49 | Alexander B. and Anna Balch Hamilton House | Alexander B. and Anna Balch Hamilton House | February 11, 1993 (#93000021) | 2723–2729 NW Savier Street; 45°32′05″N 122°42′27″W | |
| 50 | Harlow Block | Harlow Block | October 24, 1980 (#80003366) | 720–738 NW Glisan Street; 45°31′35″N 122°40′42″W | |
| 51 | Harmon–Neils House | Harmon–Neils House | February 16, 1984 (#84003080) | 2642 NW Lovejoy Street; 45°31′45″N 122°42′19″W | |
| 52 | Dr. Harry M. Hendershott House | Dr. Harry M. Hendershott House | June 19, 1991 (#91000797) | 824 NW Albemarle Terrace; 45°31′44″N 122°42′26″W | |
| 53 | George F. Heusner House | George F. Heusner House | October 19, 1978 (#78002316) | 333 NW 20th Avenue; 45°31′32″N 122°41′34″W | |
| 54 | Hill Hotel | Hill Hotel | June 9, 1995 (#95000690) | 2255–2261 W Burnside Street; 45°31′25″N 122°41′51″W | This 5-story Beaux Arts building designed by Alexander Charles Ewart was built in 1904 and used as a hotel. It is also known as Victorian Inn. |
| 55 | Capt. Herbert Holman House | Capt. Herbert Holman House | February 22, 1991 (#91000136) | 2359 NW Overton Street; 45°31′55″N 122°42′00″W | |
| 56 | Honeyman Hardware Company Building | Honeyman Hardware Company Building | December 15, 1989 (#89002124) | 832 NW Hoyt Street; 45°31′37″N 122°40′47″W | |
| 57 | Walter B. and Myrtle E. Honeyman House | Walter B. and Myrtle E. Honeyman House | September 10, 2014 (#14000598) | 2658 NW Cornell Road; 45°31′51″N 122°42′23″W | |
| 58 | Clarissa McKeyes Inman House | Clarissa McKeyes Inman House | February 23, 1990 (#90000275) | 2884 NW Cumberland Road; 45°31′43″N 122°42′38″W | |
| 59 | Irving Street Bowman Apartments | Irving Street Bowman Apartments | February 23, 1990 (#90000291) | 2004–2018 NW Irving Street; 45°31′39″N 122°41′34″W | |
| 60 | C. D. Johnson House | C. D. Johnson House | February 22, 1991 (#91000146) | 2582 NW Lovejoy Street; 45°31′46″N 122°42′16″W | |
| 61 | C. A. Landenberger House | C. A. Landenberger House | February 29, 1988 (#88000097) | 1805 NW Glisan Street; 45°31′36″N 122°41′23″W | |
| 62 | Lane – Miles Standish Company Printing Plant | Lane – Miles Standish Company Printing Plant | March 27, 2007 (#07000262) | 1539 NW 19th Avenue; 45°32′02″N 122°41′28″W | |
| 63 | Lauer Apartment Building | Lauer Apartment Building | March 5, 1992 (#92000089) | 323–337 NW 17th Avenue; 45°31′32″N 122°41′19″W | |
| 64 | Ursula K. Le Guin House | Ursula K. Le Guin House | June 17, 2026 (#100013139) | 3321 NW Thurman Street; 45°32′09″N 122°42′58″W | Home of writer Ursula K. Le Guin. |
| 65 | William H. Lewis Model House | William H. Lewis Model House | March 6, 1990 (#90000274) | 2877 NW Westover Road; 45°31′57″N 122°42′36″W | |
| 66 | Linnea Hall | Linnea Hall | December 2, 1981 (#81000517) | 2066 NW Irving Street; 45°31′39″N 122°41′38″W | |
| 67 | C. J. Livingston House | C. J. Livingston House | January 27, 2012 (#11001064) | 407 NW Albemarle Terrace; 45°31′35″N 122°42′20″W | |
| 68 | Nathan Loeb House | Nathan Loeb House | January 20, 1978 (#78002318) | 726 NW 22nd Avenue; 45°31′41″N 122°41′47″W | |
| 69 | Lombard Automobile Buildings | Lombard Automobile Buildings | January 26, 2006 (#05001553) | 134 NW 8th Avenue; 45°31′27″N 122°40′41″W | |
| 70 | Dr. K. A. J. and Cora Mackenzie House | Dr. K. A. J. and Cora Mackenzie House | May 31, 1996 (#96000625) | 615 NW 20th Avenue; 45°31′38″N 122°41′34″W | |
| 71 | Marshall–Wells Company Warehouse No. 2 | Marshall–Wells Company Warehouse No. 2 | February 23, 1989 (#89000061) | 1420 NW Lovejoy Street; 45°31′47″N 122°41′09″W | |
| 72 | Alexander D. McDougall House | Alexander D. McDougall House | March 18, 1999 (#99000359) | 3814 NW Thurman Street; 45°32′22″N 122°43′18″W | |
| 73 | Natt and Christena McDougall House | Natt and Christena McDougall House | March 18, 1999 (#99000358) | 3728 NW Thurman Street; 45°32′21″N 122°43′16″W | |
| 74 | McDougall–Campbell House | McDougall–Campbell House | February 25, 2005 (#05000095) | 3846 NW Thurman Street; 45°32′23″N 122°43′20″W | |
| 75 | Meier & Frank Delivery Depot | Meier & Frank Delivery Depot | September 3, 2001 (#01000936) | 1417 NW Everett Street; 45°31′31″N 122°41′09″W | |
| 76 | Meier & Frank Warehouse | Meier & Frank Warehouse | August 31, 2000 (#00001021) | 1400–1438 NW Irving Street; 45°31′39″N 122°41′09″W | |
| 77 | Lewis H. Mills House | Lewis H. Mills House | August 26, 1982 (#82003745) | 2039 NW Irving Street; 45°31′40″N 122°41′36″W | |
| 78 | Montgomery Ward & Company | Montgomery Ward & Company | June 6, 1985 (#85001184) | 2741 NW Vaughn Street; 45°32′15″N 122°42′28″W | |
| 79 | Melinda E. Morgan House | Melinda E. Morgan House | October 25, 1990 (#90001592) | 3115 NW Thurman Street; 45°32′10″N 122°42′50″W | |
| 80 | Paul F. Murphy House | Paul F. Murphy House | February 22, 1991 (#91000138) | 850 NW Powhatan Terrace; 45°31′44″N 122°42′43″W | |
| 81 | Isaac Neuberger House | Isaac Neuberger House | October 17, 1990 (#90001512) | 630 NW Alpine Terrace; 45°31′38″N 122°42′38″W | |
| 82 | New Houston Hotel | New Houston Hotel | February 20, 1991 (#91000058) | 230 NW 6th Avenue; 45°31′29″N 122°40′35″W | |
| 83 | Harry T. Nicolai House | Harry T. Nicolai House | October 17, 1990 (#90001511) | 2621 NW Westover Road; 45°31′42″N 122°42′21″W | |
| 84 | North Bank Depot Buildings | North Bank Depot Buildings | February 22, 1996 (#96000124) | 1029–1101 NW Hoyt Street; 45°31′39″N 122°40′56″W | |
| 85 | Olympic Apartment Building | Olympic Apartment Building | February 21, 1997 (#97000128) | 707 NW 19th Avenue; 45°31′41″N 122°41′27″W | |
| 86 | Oregon Casket Company Building | Oregon Casket Company Building | August 28, 2026 (#100013164) | 403 NW 5th Avenue; 45°31′34″N 122°40′32″W | |
| 87 | Oregon Cracker Company Building | Oregon Cracker Company Building | August 10, 1979 (#79002138) | 616 NW Glisan Street; 45°31′35″N 122°40′37″W | Built around 1897 as a food processing plant, and expanded in 1901, this is one of Portland's finest Romansque Revival buildings. The building also includes early examples of structural features that were innovative for the time, but which later became common. |
| 88 | Ormonde Apartment Building | Ormonde Apartment Building | September 8, 1987 (#87001493) | 2046–2048 NW Flanders Street; 45°31′31″N 122°41′36″W | |
| 89 | Otis Elevator Company Building | Otis Elevator Company Building | February 11, 1988 (#88000095) | 230 NW 10th Avenue; 45°31′29″N 122°40′52″W | |
| 90 | Pacific Coast Biscuit Company Building | Pacific Coast Biscuit Company Building | March 5, 1998 (#98000212) | 1101–1129 NW Davis Street; 45°31′28″N 122°40′57″W | |
| 91 | Pacific Hardware & Steel Company Warehouse | Pacific Hardware & Steel Company Warehouse | December 31, 2008 (#08001263) | 2181 NW Nicolai Street; 45°32′30″N 122°41′50″W | |
| 92 | Packard Service Building | Packard Service Building | January 28, 1994 (#93001570) | 121 NW 23rd Avenue; 45°31′27″N 122°41′55″W | |
| 93 | Pallay Building | Pallay Building | November 8, 1985 (#85003503) | 231–239 NW 3rd Avenue; 45°31′31″N 122°40′24″W | |
| 94 | J. J. and Hazel Parker House | J. J. and Hazel Parker House | October 12, 2023 (#100009462) | 2911 NW Raleigh Street; 45°32′02″N 122°42′40″W | |
| 95 | J. H. Peterson Machine Shop | J. H. Peterson Machine Shop | October 16, 2002 (#02001181) | 1626 NW Thurman Street; 45°32′08″N 122°41′17″W | |
| 96 | Pittock Mansion | Pittock Mansion | November 21, 1974 (#74001709) | 3229 NW Pittock Drive; 45°31′29″N 122°43′02″W | |
| 97 | Otho Poole House | Otho Poole House | February 28, 1991 (#91000150) | 506 NW Hermosa Boulevard; 45°31′32″N 122°42′35″W | |
| 98 | Portland Buddhist Church | Portland Buddhist Church | January 21, 2004 (#03001476) | 312 NW 10th Avenue; 45°31′31″N 122°40′52″W | |
| 99 | Portland Cordage Company Building | Portland Cordage Company Building | February 11, 1993 (#93000018) | 1313 NW Marshall Street; 45°31′51″N 122°41′05″W | |
| 100 | Portland Fire Station No. 17 | Portland Fire Station No. 17 | March 12, 1987 (#87000311) | 824 NW 24th Avenue; 45°31′44″N 122°42′01″W | |
| 101 | Portland New Chinatown–Japantown Historic District | Portland New Chinatown–Japantown Historic District | November 21, 1989 (#89001957) | Bounded by NW Glisan Street, NW 3rd Avenue, W Burnside Street, and NW 5th Avenue; 45°31′30″N 122°40′28″W | |
| 102 | Portland Skidmore/Old Town Historic District | Portland Skidmore/Old Town Historic District | December 6, 1975 (#75001597) | Roughly bounded by the Willamette River, NW Everett Street, NW/SW 3rd Avenue, and SW Oak Street; 45°31′21″N 122°40′18″W | One of the most impressive historic commercial districts on the West Coast, this is where Portland began and first flourished. The buildings, which date from the mid-to-late-19th century, were built in a variety of High Victorian architectural styles, and many feature cast iron fronts. Also extends into Southwest Portland. |
| 103 | Portland Thirteenth Avenue Historic District | Portland Thirteenth Avenue Historic District | June 15, 1987 (#87000888) | Along NW 13th Avenue between NW Davis and Johnson Streets; 45°31′38″N 122°41′03″W | |
| 104 | Prager–Lombard House | Prager–Lombard House | February 22, 1991 (#91000149) | 2032 NW Everett Street; 45°31′29″N 122°41′35″W | |
| 105 | Regent Apartments | Regent Apartments | February 20, 1991 (#91000044) | 1975 NW Everett Street; 45°31′30″N 122°41′31″W | |
| 106 | Dr. Leo Ricen House | Dr. Leo Ricen House | March 9, 1992 (#92000086) | 2624 NW Overton Street; 45°31′54″N 122°42′18″W | |
| 107 | Rose City Electric Automobile Garage | Rose City Electric Automobile Garage | February 22, 1996 (#96000122) | 124 NW 20th Avenue; 45°31′27″N 122°41′31″W | |
| 108 | St. Patrick's Roman Catholic Church and Rectory | St. Patrick's Roman Catholic Church and Rectory | May 1, 1974 (#74001713) | 1635 NW 19th Avenue; 45°32′05″N 122°41′28″W | |
| 109 | Sengstake Building | Sengstake Building | October 31, 2012 (#12000901) | 310 NW Broadway; 45°31′32″N 122°40′39″W | |
| 110 | Seven Hundred Five Davis Street Apartments | Seven Hundred Five Davis Street Apartments | October 10, 1980 (#80003374) | 2141 NW Davis Street; 45°31′28″N 122°41′43″W | This 7-story Neo-Renaissance building designed by Whitehouse & Fouilhoux was built in 1913 and quickly became one of Portland's most fashionable addresses due to its fine design and materials and large rooms. Its original owner, Julia Hoffman (1856–1934), was a major figure in the Portland arts community, both as practitioner and advocate. (Note: Julia Hoffman's son Lee Hawley Hoffman was the founder of Hoffman Construction Company.) She lived in the building's penthouse until her death. |
| 111 | Mary J. G. Smith House | Mary J. G. Smith House | December 2, 1981 (#81000519) | 2256 NW Johnson Street; 45°31′41″N 122°41′52″W | |
| 112 | Spokane, Portland and Seattle Railroad Warehouse | Spokane, Portland and Seattle Railroad Warehouse | October 3, 1996 (#96001071) | 1631 NW Thurman Street; 45°32′09″N 122°41′17″W | |
| 113 | Sprague–Marshall–Bowie House | Sprague–Marshall–Bowie House | February 5, 1980 (#80003375) | 2234 NW Johnson Street; 45°31′41″N 122°41′51″W | |
| 114 | John A. Sprouse Jr. House | John A. Sprouse Jr. House | February 19, 1991 (#91000068) | 2826 NW Cumberland Road; 45°31′46″N 122°42′30″W | |
| 115 | Frank C. Stettler House | Frank C. Stettler House | February 23, 1990 (#90000287) | 2606 NW Lovejoy Street; 45°31′47″N 122°42′16″W | |
| 116 | Francis Marion Stokes Fourplex | Francis Marion Stokes Fourplex | February 22, 1996 (#96000121) | 2253 NW Pettygrove Street; 45°31′58″N 122°41′52″W | |
| 117 | Swedish Evangelical Mission Covenant Church | Swedish Evangelical Mission Covenant Church | October 7, 1982 (#82001514) | 1624 NW Glisan Street; 45°31′34″N 122°41′17″W | |
| 118 | Sweeney, Straub and Dimm Printing Plant | Sweeney, Straub and Dimm Printing Plant | June 16, 2004 (#04000615) | 535 NW 16th Avenue; 45°31′37″N 122°41′17″W | |
| 119 | Ernest G. Swigert House | Ernest G. Swigert House | February 28, 1991 (#91000134) | 720 NW Warrenton Terrace; 45°31′41″N 122°42′49″W | |
| 120 | Albert H. Tanner House | Albert H. Tanner House | March 11, 1983 (#83002175) | 2248 NW Johnson Street; 45°31′41″N 122°41′51″W | |
| 121 | Louis and Bessie Tarpley House | Louis and Bessie Tarpley House | August 23, 2007 (#07000843) | 2520 NW Westover Road; 45°31′43″N 122°42′12″W | |
| 122 | Fred E. Taylor House | Fred E. Taylor House | October 17, 1990 (#90001519) | 2873 NW Shenandoah Terrace; 45°31′51″N 122°42′36″W | |
| 123 | Temple Beth Israel | Temple Beth Israel | July 26, 1979 (#79002141) | 1931 NW Flanders Street; 45°31′34″N 122°41′27″W | |
| 124 | Trenkmann Houses | Trenkmann Houses | January 30, 1978 (#78002323) | 1704–1734 NW Hoyt Street; 45°31′37″N 122°41′20″W | |
| 125 | Trevett–Nunn House | Trevett–Nunn House | February 5, 1980 (#80003376) | 2347–2349 NW Flanders Street; 45°31′33″N 122°41′58″W | The 2.5-story residential building was erected in 1891 by the prominent architectural firm Whidden & Lewis in the Colonial Revival style and is located in the Alphabet Historic District. |
| 126 | Trinity Place Apartments | Trinity Place Apartments | February 23, 1990 (#90000294) | 117 NW Trinity Place; 45°31′26″N 122°41′30″W | |
| 127 | Tudor Arms Apartments | Tudor Arms Apartments | January 28, 1994 (#93001562) | 1811 NW Couch Street; 45°31′26″N 122°41′22″W | |
| 128 | Union Station | Union Station | August 6, 1975 (#75001595) | 800 NW 6th Avenue; 45°31′45″N 122°40′36″W | |
| 129 | U.S. Customhouse | U.S. Customhouse | May 2, 1974 (#74001714) | 220 NW 8th Avenue; 45°31′29″N 122°40′43″W | |
| 130 | U.S. Post Office | U.S. Post Office | April 18, 1979 (#79002143) | 511 NW Broadway; 45°31′37″N 122°40′41″W | |
| 131 | Frank M. Warren House | Frank M. Warren House | June 16, 1989 (#89000509) | 2545 NW Westover Road; 45°31′43″N 122°42′12″W | |
| 132 | Weinhard Brewery Complex | Weinhard Brewery Complex | August 23, 2000 (#00001018) | 1131–1133 W Burnside Street; 45°31′23″N 122°40′57″W | |
| 133 | Weist Apartments | Weist Apartments | February 23, 1990 (#90000293) | 209 NW 23rd Avenue; 45°31′28″N 122°41′56″W | |
| 134 | Isam White House | Isam White House | October 17, 1991 (#91001557) | 311 NW 20th Avenue; 45°31′31″N 122°41′34″W | |
| 135 | Wickersham Apartments | Wickersham Apartments | March 10, 1983 (#83002178) | 410 NW 18th Avenue; 45°31′33″N 122°41′21″W | |
| 136 | George H. Williams Townhouses | George H. Williams Townhouses | March 22, 1984 (#84003097) | 133 NW 18th Avenue; 45°31′27″N 122°41′22″W | |
| 137 | Wilson–South House | Wilson–South House | January 27, 1999 (#99000065) | 2772 NW Calumet Terrace; 45°31′29″N 122°42′32″W | |

== Former listings ==
| | Name on the Register | Image | Date listed | Date removed | Location | Description |
|---|---|---|---|---|---|---|
| 1 | Capt. John A. Brown House | | October 26, 1971 (#71001086) | December 13, 2010 | 525 NW 19th Ave. | Demolished in 1973. |
| 2 | Clarke–Woodward Drug Company Building | | March 2, 1989 (#89000121) | August 2, 2000 | 911 NW Hoyt Street | Demolished in 1997. |
| 3 | United States Steel Corporation Office and Warehouse | | January 31, 1994 (#93001561) | October 20, 2010 | 2345 NW Nicolai Street; 45°32′27″N 122°42′00″W | Demolished in 2000. |

== See also ==
- National Register of Historic Places listings in Oregon
- National Register of Historic Places listings in Multnomah County, Oregon
- Listings in neighboring counties: Clackamas, Clark, Columbia, Hood River, Skamania, Washington
- List of National Historic Landmarks in Oregon
- Historic preservation
- History of Portland, Oregon
- Lists of Oregon-related topics
