= Rose City Electric Automobile Garage =

Historic building in Portland, Oregon, U.S.

- U.S. National Register of Historic Places
- U.S. Historic district – Contributing property
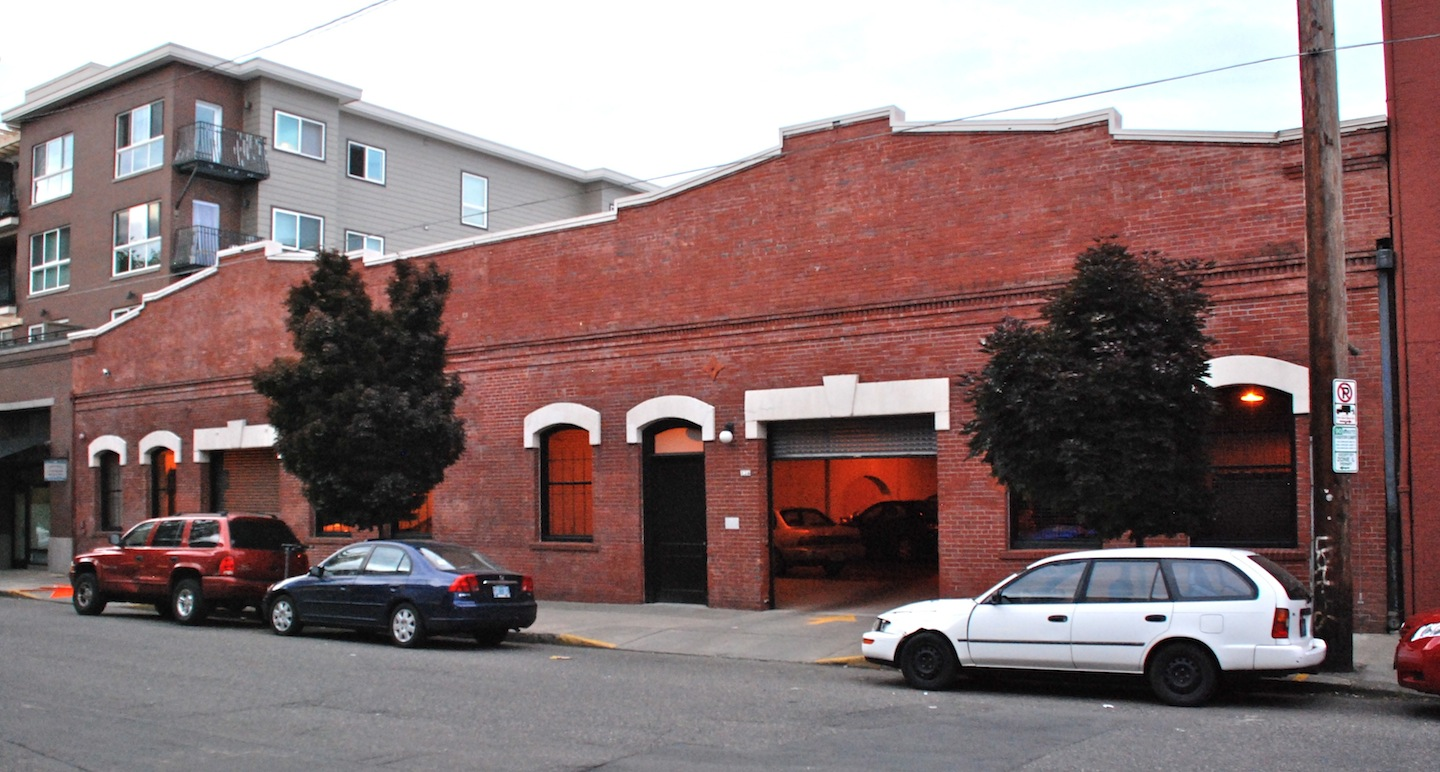
- The Rose City Electric Automobile Garage in 2011

- Location within Portland, Oregon Location within Oregon Location within the United States
- Location: 124 NW 20th Avenue; Portland, Oregon
- Coordinates: 45°31′27″N 122°41′31″W
- Area: 0.2 acres (0.081 ha)
- Built: 1910
- Architect: Lewis and Lewis
- Architectural style: Early Commercial
- Part of: Alphabet Historic District (ID00001293)
- NRHP reference No.: 96000122
- Added to NRHP: February 22, 1996

The Rose City Electric Automobile Garage, located in northwest Portland, Oregon, is listed on the National Register of Historic Places.

== See also ==
- National Register of Historic Places listings in Northwest Portland, Oregon
