= Marshall–Wells Company Warehouse No. 2 =

Building in Portland, Oregon, United States

Coordinates: 45.5297°N 122.6859°W

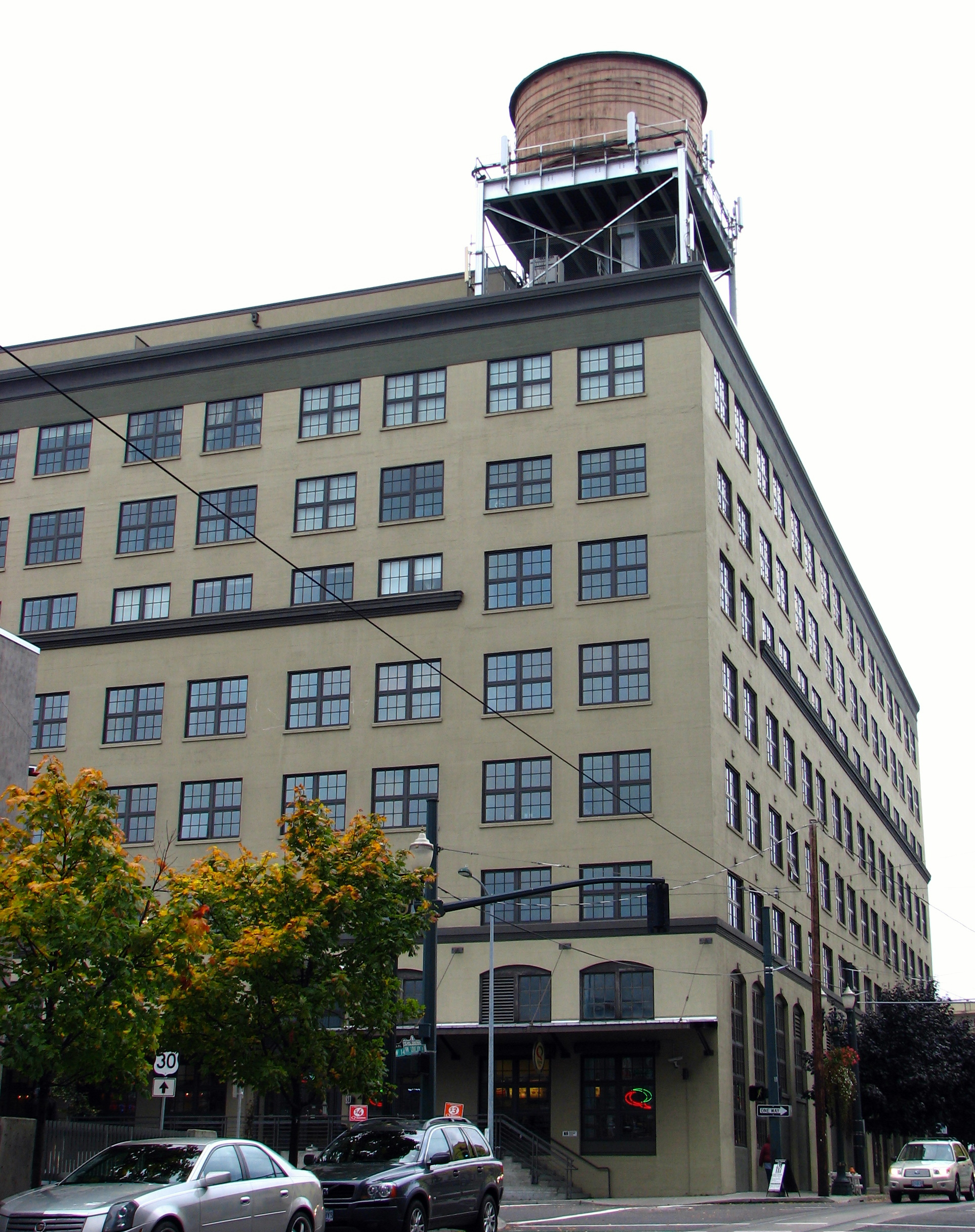
The building's exterior in 2009

Marshall–Wells Company Warehouse No. 2 is a historic building in Portland, Oregon, United States. It is listed on the National Register of Historic Places.

== See also ==
- National Register of Historic Places listings in Northwest Portland, Oregon
