= Wilson–South House =

Historic building in Portland, Oregon, U.S.

- U.S. National Register of Historic Places
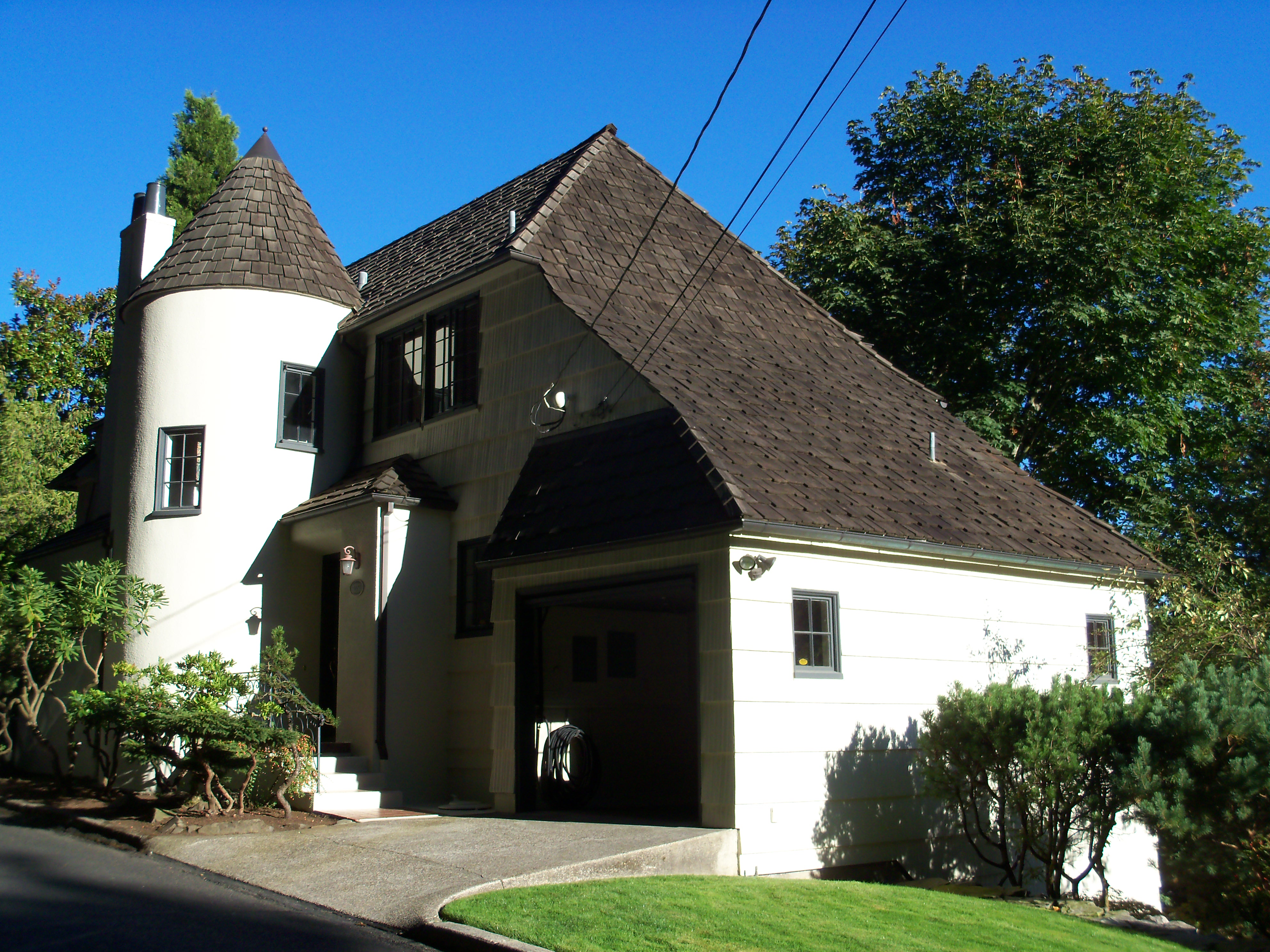

- Location within Portland, Oregon
- Location: 2772 NW Calumet Terrace, Portland, Oregon
- Coordinates: 45°31′29″N 122°42′32″W
- Area: 0.2 acres (0.081 ha)
- Built: 1929
- Architect: Harold D. Uppinghouse
- Architectural style: Late 19th And 20th Century Revivals
- NRHP reference No.: 99000065
- Added to NRHP: January 27, 1999

The Wilson–South House is a house located in northwest Portland, Oregon listed on the National Register of Historic Places.

== See also ==
- National Register of Historic Places listings in Northwest Portland, Oregon
