= Clarke–Mossman House =

Historic building in Portland, Oregon, U.S.

- U.S. National Register of Historic Places
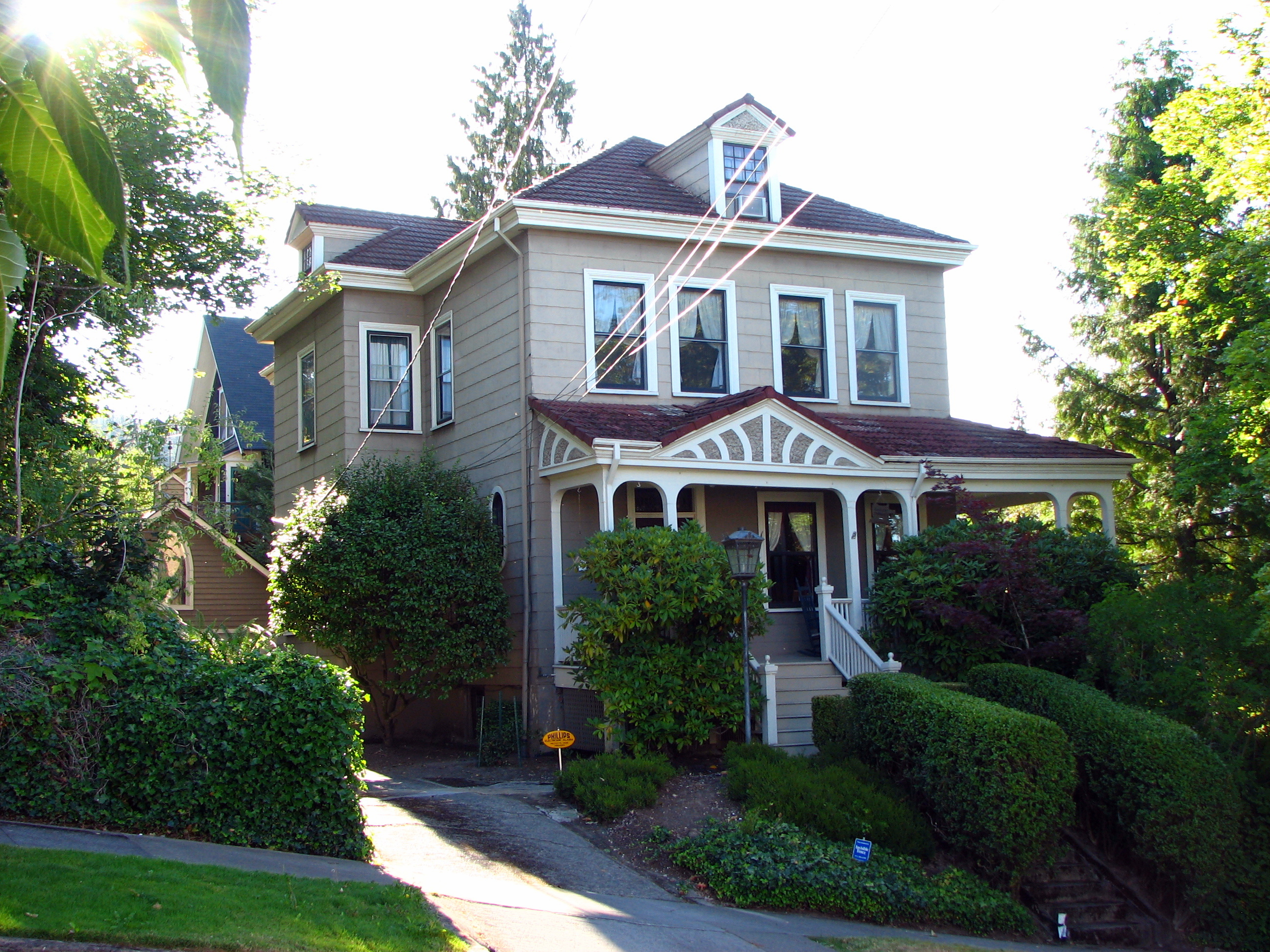
- Clarke–Mossman House in 2009

- Location within Portland, Oregon
- Location: 1625 NW 29th Avenue; Portland, Oregon
- Coordinates: 45°32′03″N 122°42′40″W
- Built: 1893
- Architectural style: Colonial Revival
- NRHP reference No.: 02001484
- Added to NRHP: December 6, 2002

The Clarke–Mossman House is a house located in northwest Portland, Oregon, listed on the National Register of Historic Places.

== See also ==
- National Register of Historic Places listings in Northwest Portland, Oregon
