= New Houston Hotel =

Building in Portland, Oregon, United States

Coordinates: 45.525°N 122.6762°W

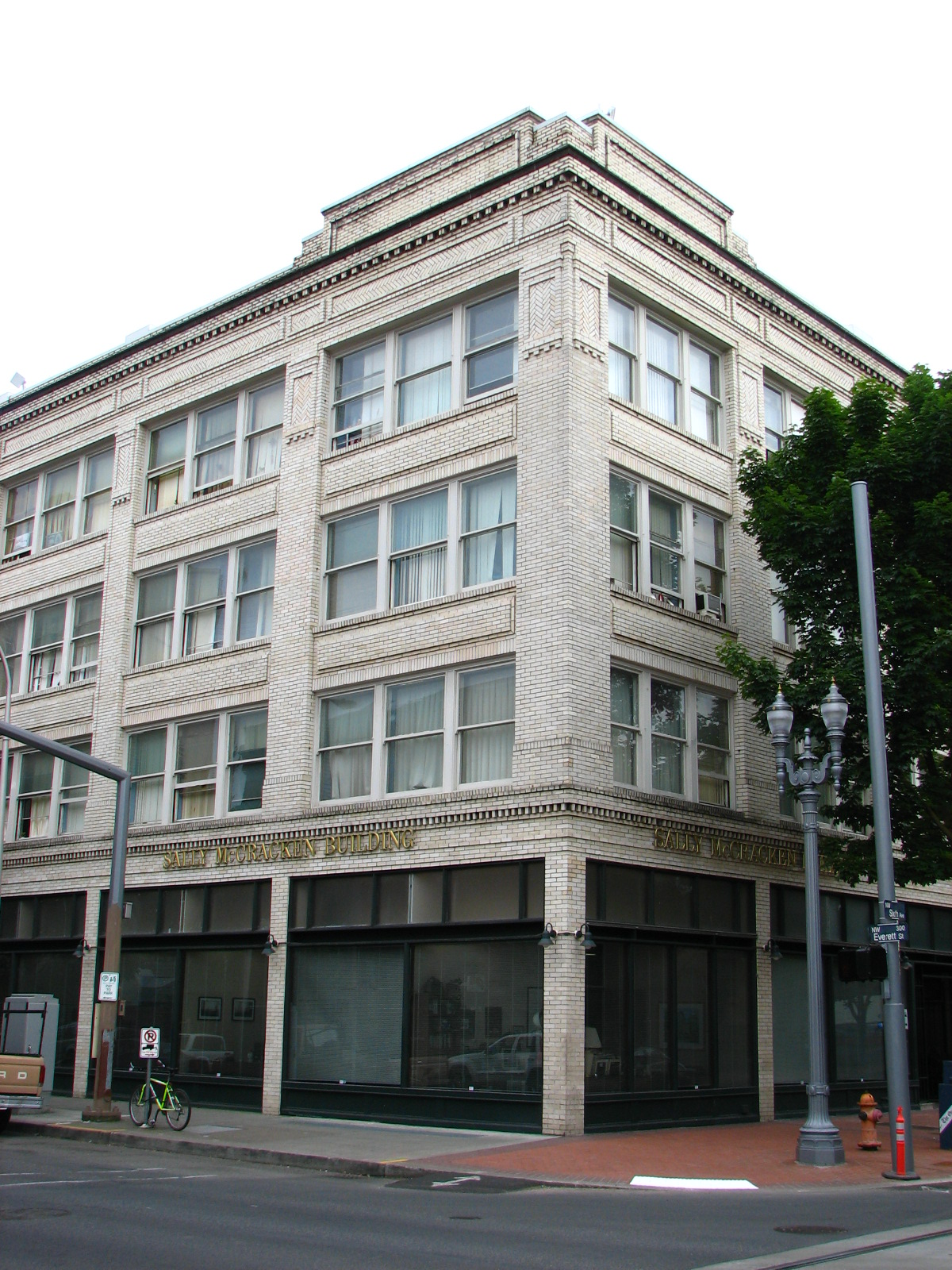
- The building's exterior in 2008
- Former names: Montana Hotel; Belmont Hotel; Libbey Hotel; Athens Hotel
- Alternative names: Sally McCracken Apartments

General information
- Type: Apartment
- Architectural style: Chicago School
- Location: 230 NW 6th Avenue; Portland, Oregon, United States
- Year built: 1912
- Renovated: 2019
- Owner: Central City Concern

Technical details
- Material: Brick
- Floor count: 4
- Floor area: 33,250 square feet (3,089 m^{2})

Design and construction
- Architect: Hans Hanselman

Renovating team
- Renovating firm: Kasa Architects

Other information
- Number of units: 95
- Public transit: Portland Transit Mall
- New Houston Hotel
- U.S. National Register of Historic Places
- NRHP reference No.: 91000058
- Added to NRHP: February 20, 1991

The New Houston Hotel is a historic building in Portland, Oregon, United States. It is listed on the National Register of Historic Places.

== See also ==
- National Register of Historic Places listings in Northwest Portland, Oregon
