= Ormonde Apartment Building =

Historic building in Portland, Oregon, U.S.

- U.S. National Register of Historic Places
- U.S. Historic district – Contributing property
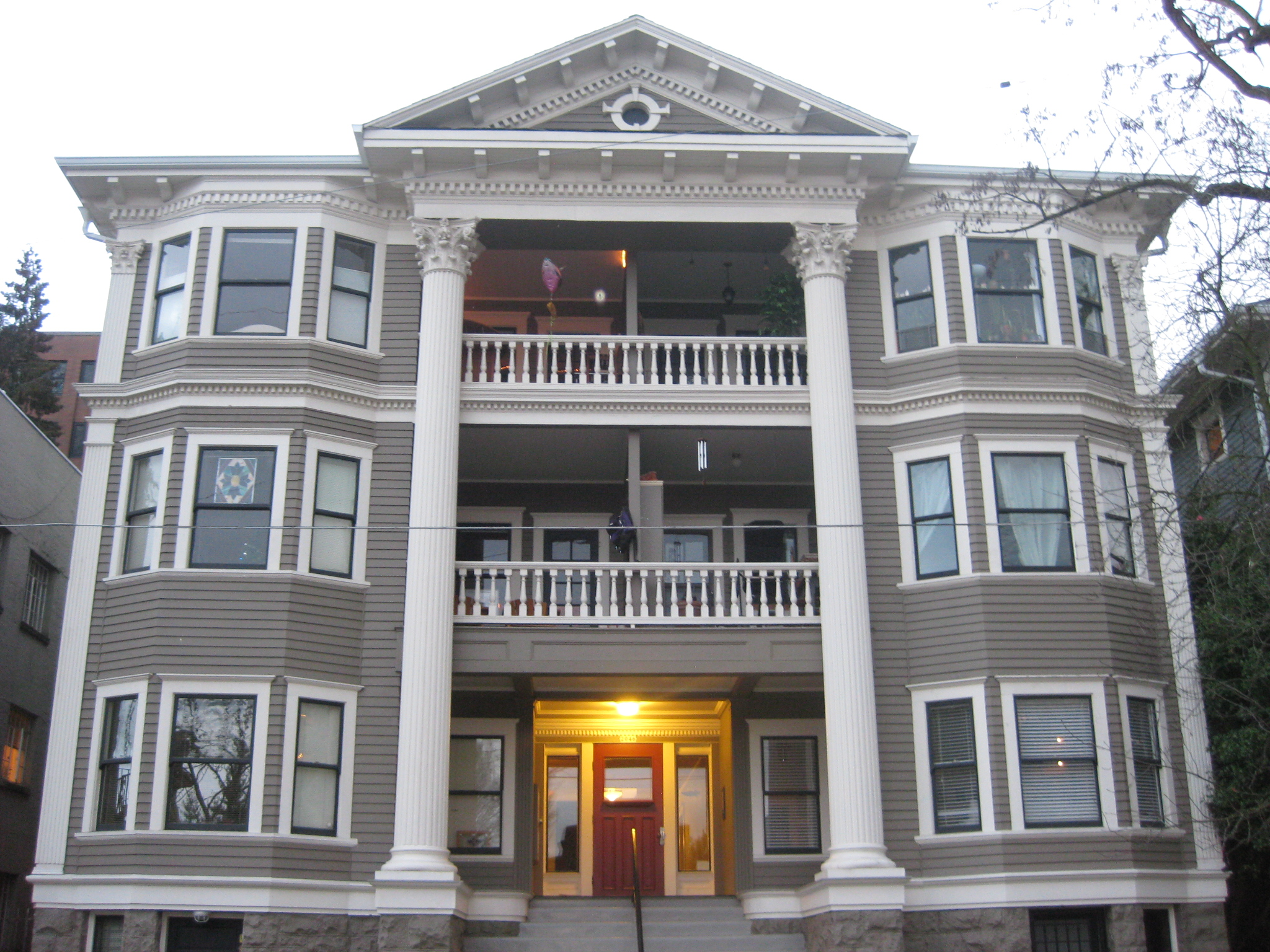

- Location within Portland, Oregon Location within Oregon Location within the United States
- Location: 2046–2048 NW Flanders Street; Portland, Oregon
- Coordinates: 45°31′31″N 122°41′36″W
- Built: 1907
- Architect: William L. Morgan
- Architectural style: Colonial Revival
- Part of: Alphabet Historic District (ID00001293)
- NRHP reference No.: 87001493
- Added to NRHP: September 8, 1987

The Ormonde Apartment Building is a building located in northwest Portland, Oregon listed on the National Register of Historic Places.

== See also ==
- National Register of Historic Places listings in Northwest Portland, Oregon
