= Cardwell–Holman House =

Historic building in Portland, Oregon, U.S.

- U.S. National Register of Historic Places
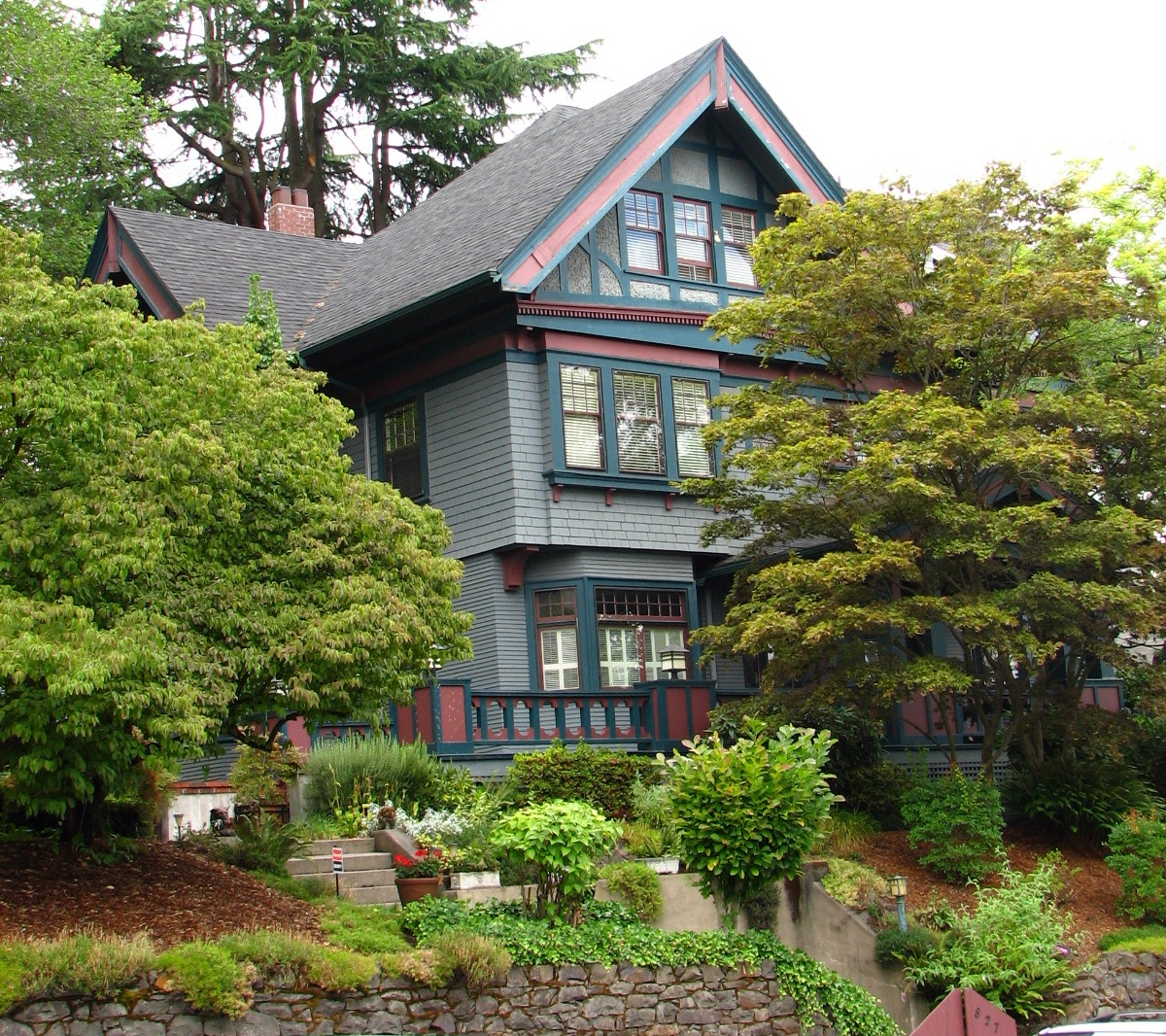
- The Cardwell–Holman House in 2008

- Location within Portland, Oregon
- Location: 827 NW 25th Avenue; Portland, Oregon
- Coordinates: 45°31′44″N 122°42′11″W
- Built: 1905
- Architect: Eric W. Hendricks
- Architectural style: Tudor Revival, Bungalow/Craftsman
- NRHP reference No.: 05001057
- Added to NRHP: September 21, 2005

The Cardwell–Holman House is a house located in northwest Portland, Oregon listed on the National Register of Historic Places.

It was designed as an early Tudor-style residence with Arts and Crafts features by Portland architect Eric W. Hendricks in 1905.

== See also ==
- National Register of Historic Places listings in Northwest Portland, Oregon
