= Melinda E. Morgan House =

Historic building in Portland, Oregon, U.S.

- U.S. National Register of Historic Places
- Portland Historic Landmark
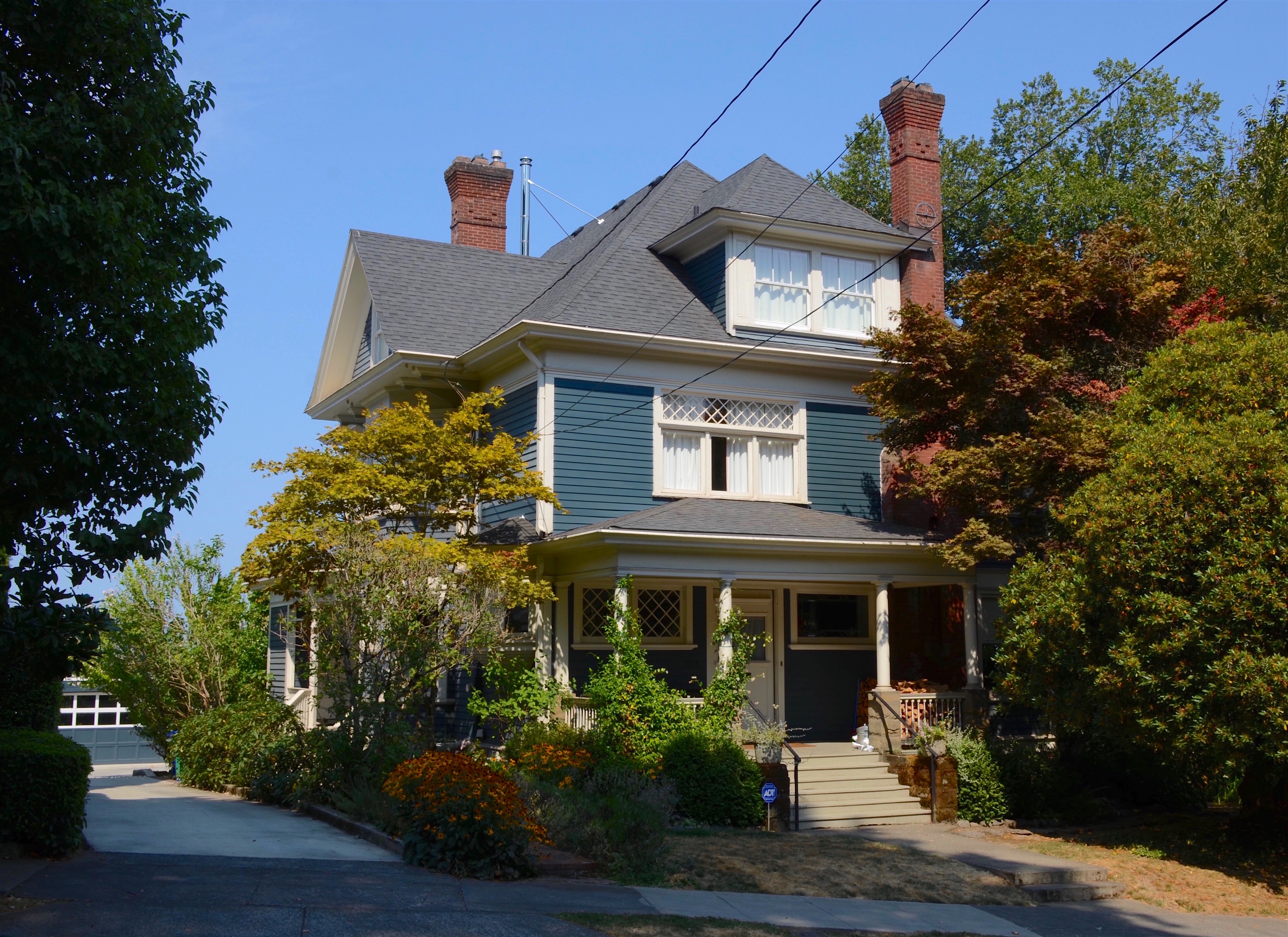
- The Melinda Morgan House in 2017

- Location within Portland, Oregon Location within Oregon Location within the United States
- Location: 3115 NW Thurman Street; Portland, Oregon
- Coordinates: 45°32′10″N 122°42′50″W
- Area: less than one acre
- Built: 1893
- Architectural style: Colonial Revival, Queen Anne
- NRHP reference No.: 90001592
- Added to NRHP: October 25, 1990

The Melinda E. Morgan House is a house located in northwest Portland, Oregon, that is listed on the National Register of Historic Places.

== See also ==
- National Register of Historic Places listings in Northwest Portland, Oregon
