= Harry T. Nicolai House =

Historic building in Portland, Oregon, U.S.

- U.S. National Register of Historic Places
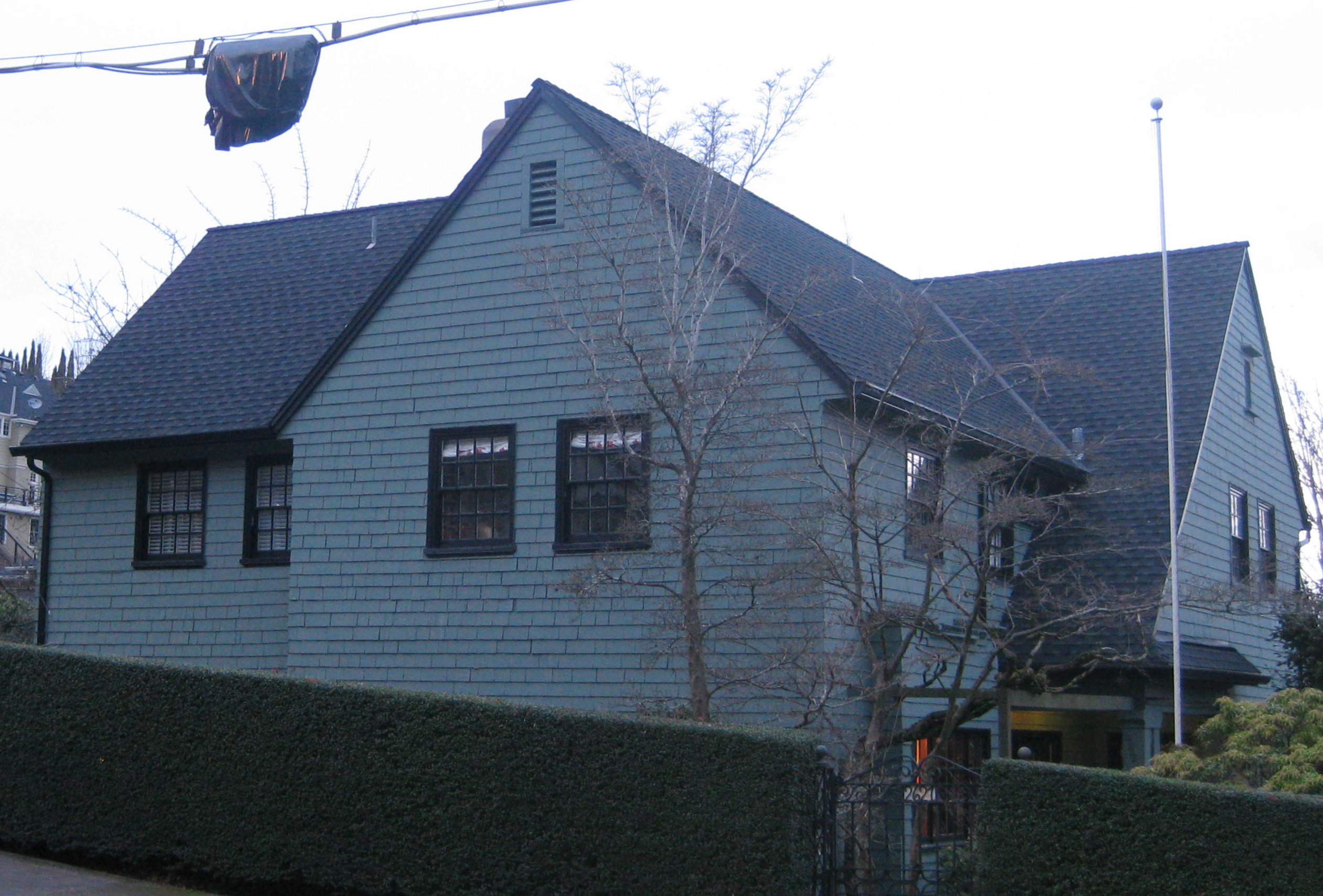

- Location within Portland, Oregon
- Location: 2621 NW Westover Rd, Portland, Oregon
- Coordinates: 45°31′43″N 122°42′16″W
- Built: 1908
- Architect: Raymond & Lawrence MacNaughton
- Architectural style: Colonial Revival
- MPS: Architecture of Ellis F. Lawrence MPS
- NRHP reference No.: 90001511
- Added to NRHP: October 17, 1990

The Harry T. Nicolai House is a house located in northwest Portland, Oregon listed on the National Register of Historic Places.

== See also ==
- National Register of Historic Places listings in Northwest Portland, Oregon
