= Henry M. Grant House =

Historic building in Portland, Oregon, U.S.

- U.S. National Register of Historic Places
- Portland Historic Landmark
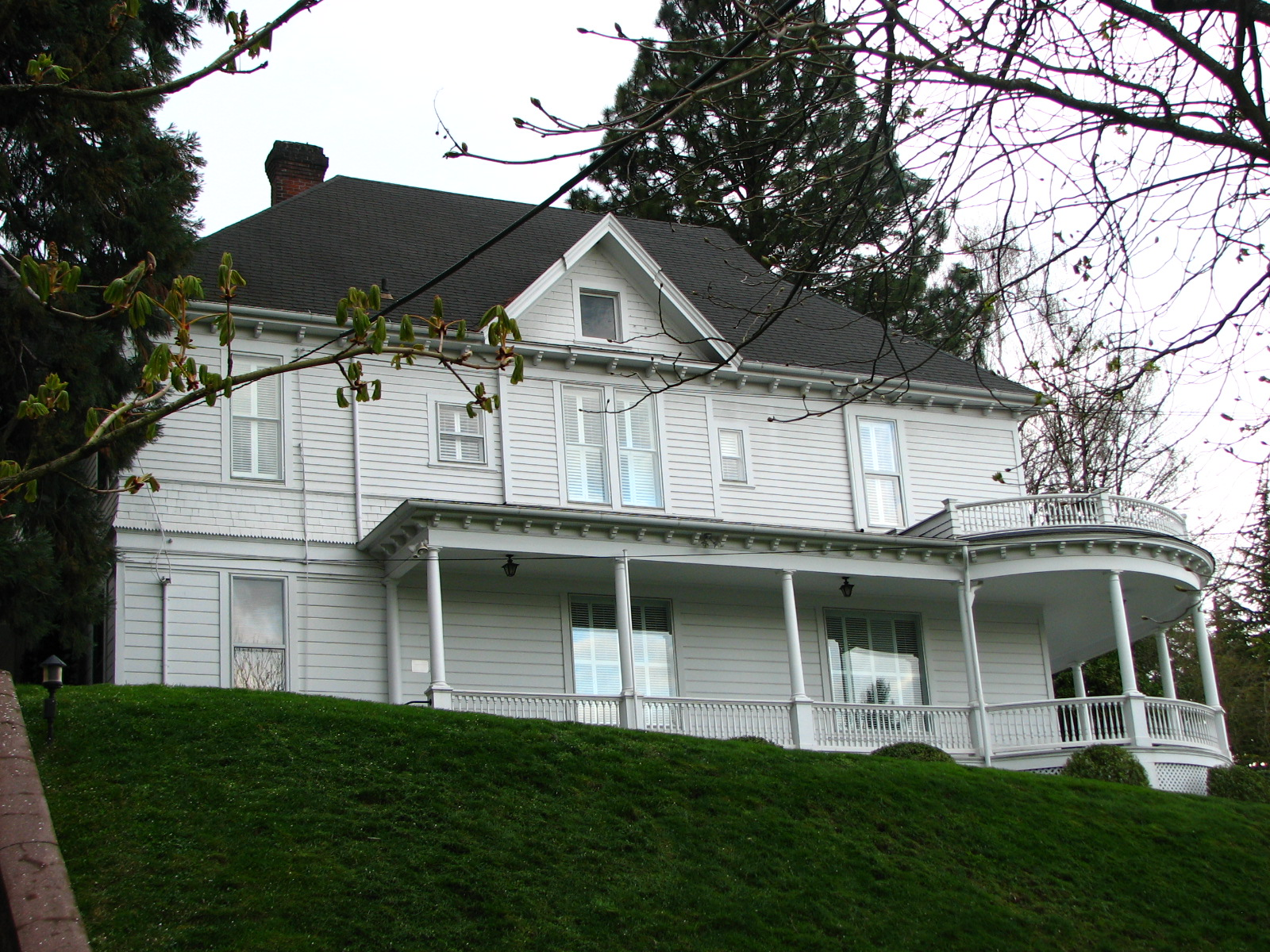

- Location within Portland, Oregon
- Location: 3114 NW Thurman Street; Portland, Oregon
- Coordinates: 45°32′08″N 122°42′51″W
- Built: 1892
- Architect: John Hale
- Architectural style: Queen Anne
- NRHP reference No.: 91000148
- Added to NRHP: February 22, 1991

The Henry M. Grant House is a house located in northwest Portland, Oregon, listed on the National Register of Historic Places.

== See also ==
- National Register of Historic Places listings in Northwest Portland, Oregon
