= Honeyman Hardware Company Building =

Historic building in Portland, Oregon, U.S.

- U.S. National Register of Historic Places
- Portland Historic Landmark
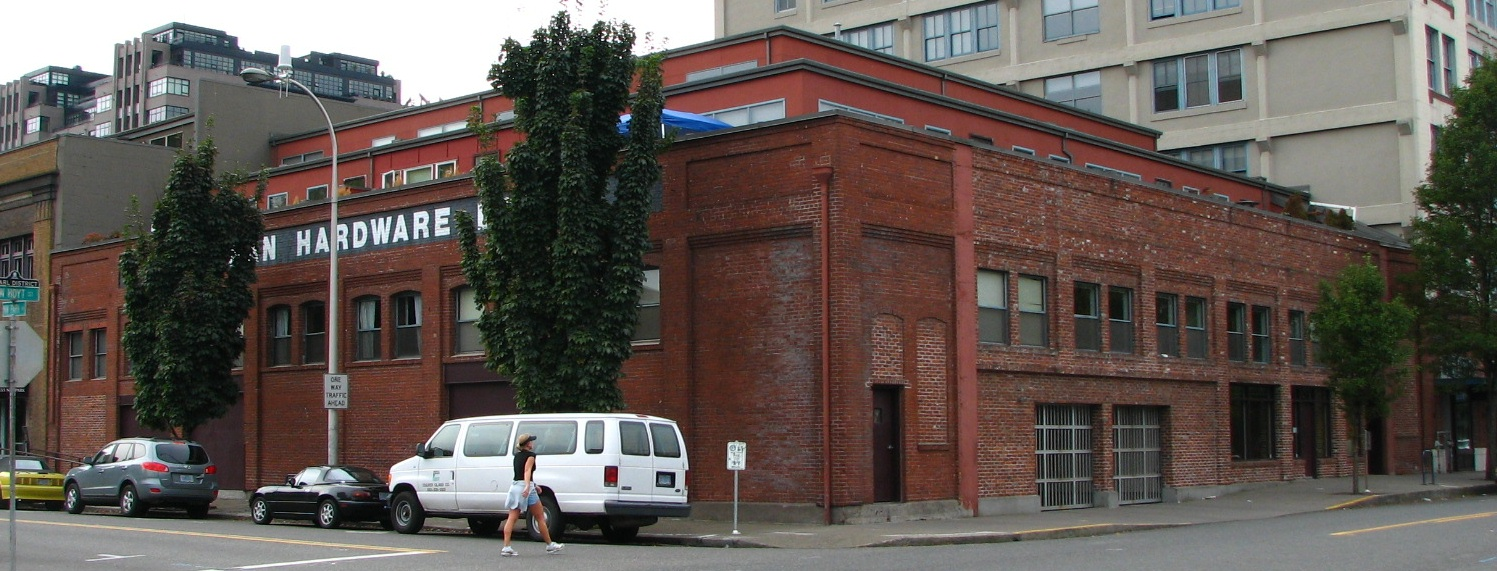
- The oldest section of the Honeyman Hardware Company Building at the corner of NW Hoyt Street and NW Park Avenue in 2008; the newer sections are visible behind and to the left and right of the central brick structure.

- Location within Portland, Oregon
- Location: 832 NW Hoyt Street; 502–514 NW 9th Avenue; Portland, Oregon
- Coordinates: 45°31′37″N 122°40′47″W
- Built: 1912; 114 years ago
- Architect: David Chambers Lewis
- Architectural style: Commercial Style
- NRHP reference No.: 89002124
- Added to NRHP: December 15, 1989

The Honeyman Hardware Company Building is a historic commercial building located at 832 NW Hoyt Street in Northwest Portland, Oregon. It was completed in 1912 and was listed on the National Register of Historic Places on December 15, 1989.

== See also ==
- National Register of Historic Places listings in Northwest Portland, Oregon
