= Prager–Lombard House =

Historic building in Portland, Oregon, U.S.

- U.S. National Register of Historic Places
- U.S. Historic district – Contributing property
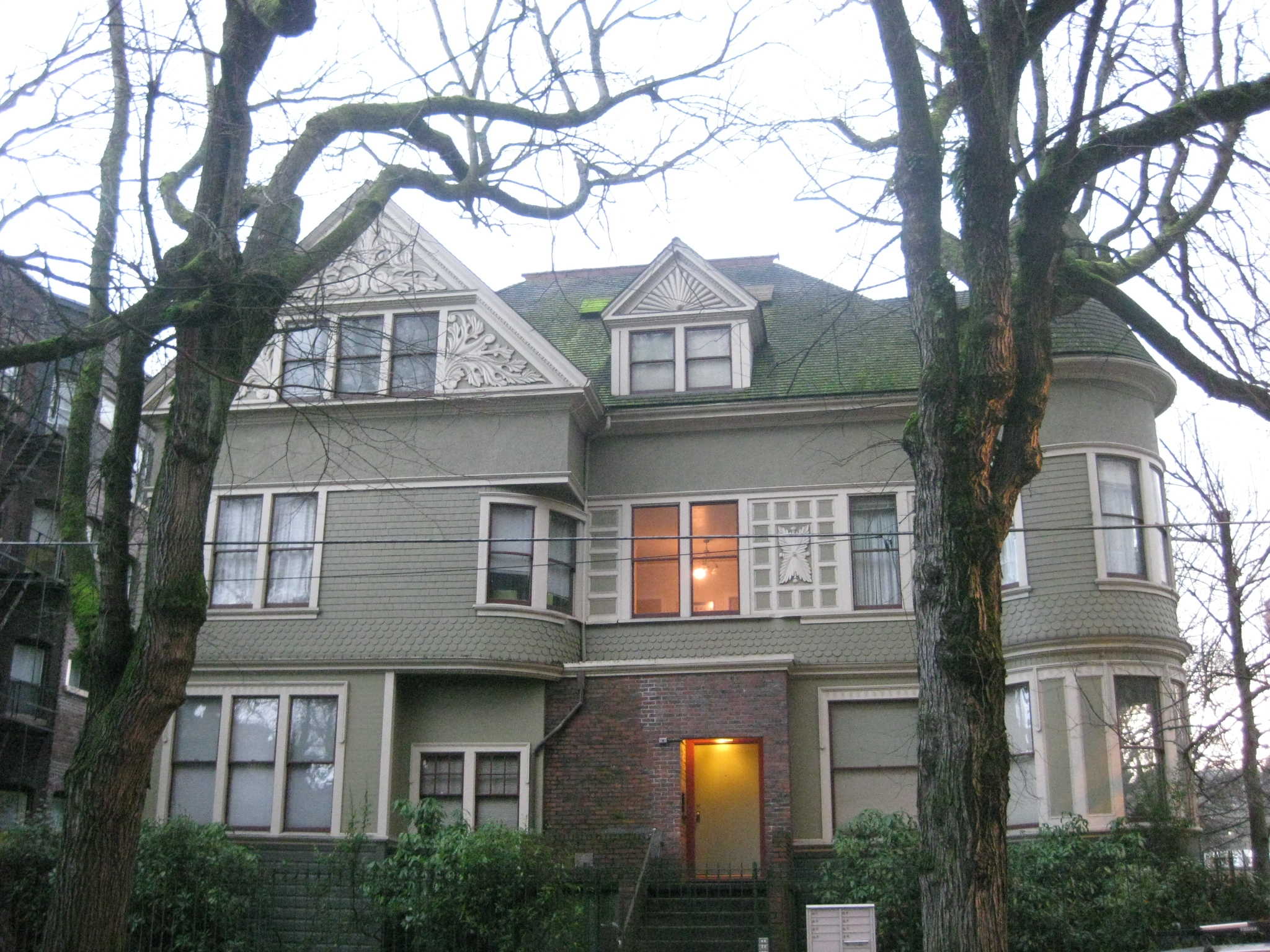

- Location within Portland, Oregon Location within Oregon Location within the United States
- Location: 2032 NW Everett Street; Portland, Oregon
- Coordinates: 45°31′29″N 122°41′35″W
- Built: 1890
- Architectural style: Queen Anne
- Part of: Alphabet Historic District (ID00001293)
- NRHP reference No.: 91000149
- Added to NRHP: February 22, 1991

The Prager–Lombard House is a house located in northwest Portland, Oregon, that is listed on the National Register of Historic Places.

== See also ==
- National Register of Historic Places listings in Northwest Portland, Oregon
