= Joseph Bergman House =

Historic building in Portland, Oregon, U.S.

- U.S. National Register of Historic Places
- U.S. Historic district – Contributing property
- Portland Historic Landmark
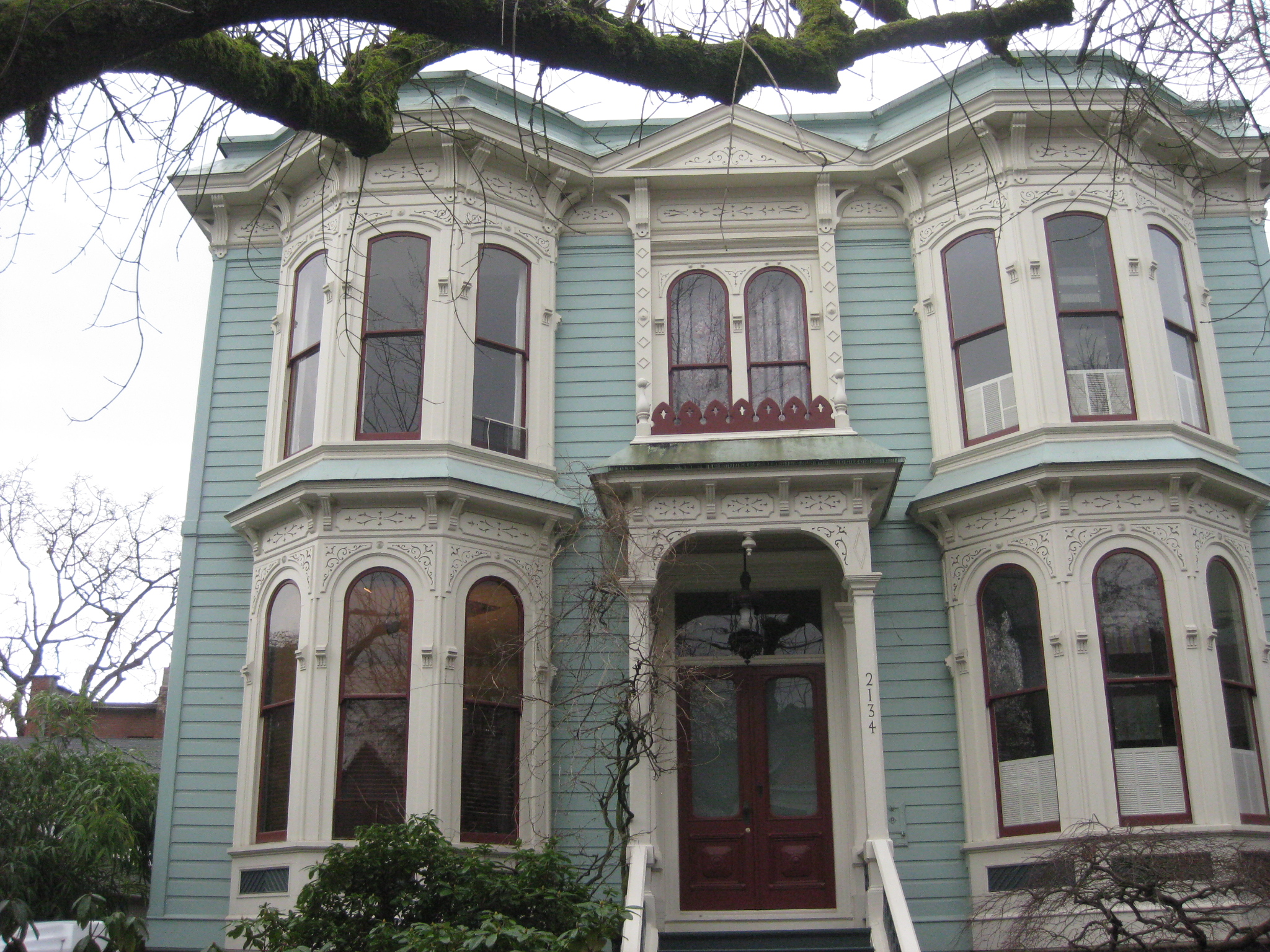
- The Bergman House in 2010

- Location within Oregon Location within the United States
- Location: 2134 NW Hoyt Street; Portland, Oregon
- Coordinates: 45°31′37″N 122°41′43″W
- Built: 1885
- Architectural style: Italianate, High Victorian Italiante
- Part of: Alphabet Historic District (ID00001293)
- NRHP reference No.: 83002168
- Added to NRHP: September 1, 1983

The Joseph Bergman House is a house located in northwest Portland, Oregon, United States, listed on the National Register of Historic Places.

== See also ==
- National Register of Historic Places listings in Northwest Portland, Oregon
