= Louis and Bessie Tarpley House =

Historic building in Portland, Oregon, U.S.

- U.S. National Register of Historic Places
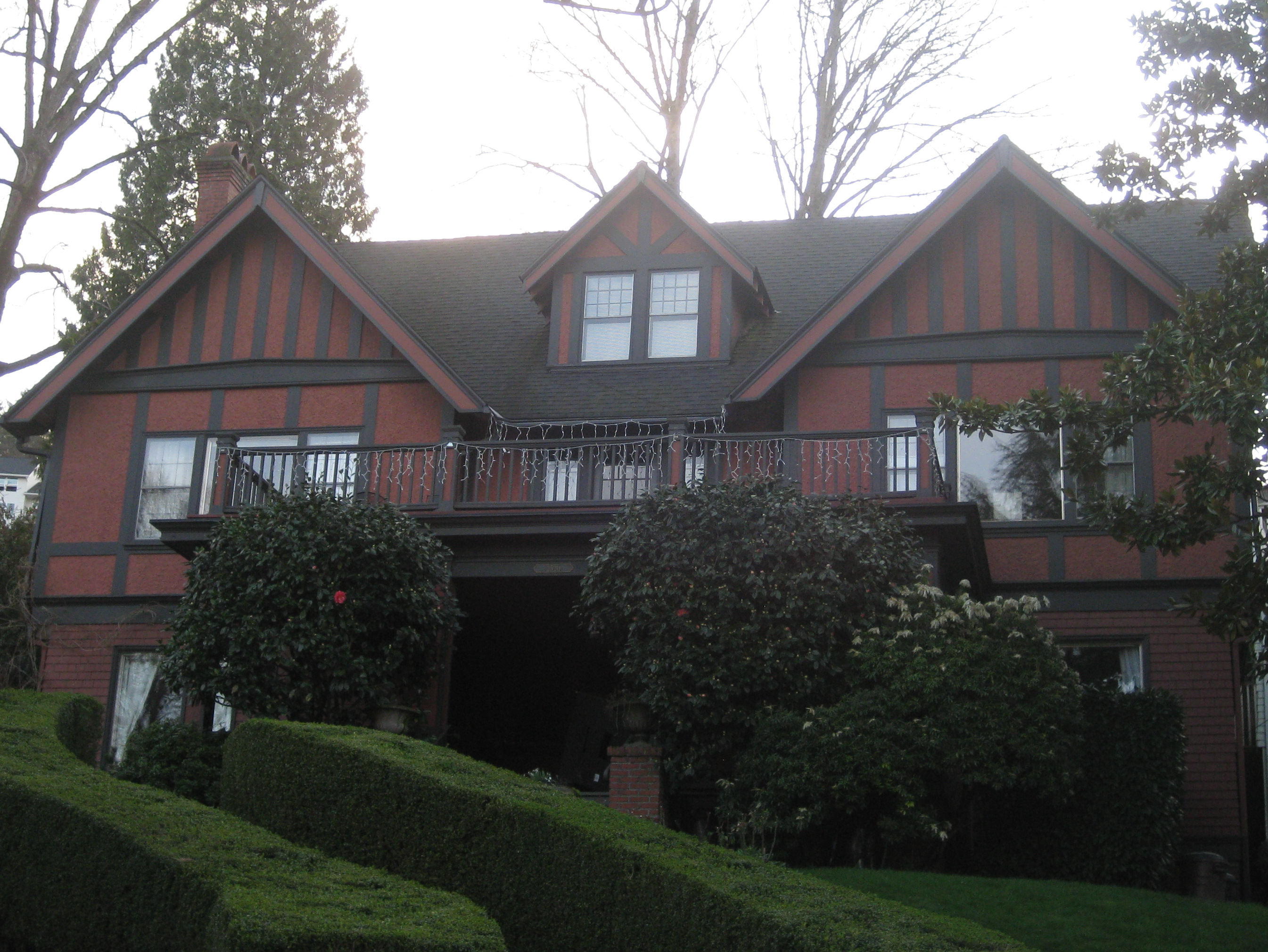
- The house's exterior in 2010

- Location within Oregon Location within the United States
- Location: 2520 NW Westover Rd, Portland, Oregon
- Coordinates: 45°31′43″N 122°42′8″W
- Built: 1907
- Architect: David C. Lewis, Fred Oppenlander
- Architectural style: Tudor Revival, Bungalow/Craftsman
- NRHP reference No.: 07000843
- Added to NRHP: August 23, 2007

The Louis and Bessie Tarpley House is a house located in northwest Portland, Oregon listed on the National Register of Historic Places.

== See also ==
- National Register of Historic Places listings in Northwest Portland, Oregon
