= Campbell Townhouses =

Historic building in Portland, Oregon, U.S.

- U.S. National Register of Historic Places
- U.S. Historic district – Contributing property
- Portland Historic Landmark

- Location within Portland, Oregon Location within Oregon Location within the United States
- Location: 1705–1719 NW Irving St and 715–719 17th Ave, Portland, Oregon
- Coordinates: 45°31′41″N 122°41′19″W
- Built: 1893
- Architect: Daniel F. Campbell
- Architectural style: Queen Anne
- Part of: Alphabet Historic District (ID00001293)
- NRHP reference No.: 80003360
- Added to NRHP: February 12, 1980

The Campbell Townhouses, located in northwest Portland, Oregon, are listed on the National Register of Historic Places.

== See also ==
- National Register of Historic Places listings in Northwest Portland, Oregon
