= Dayton Apartment Building =

Historic building in Portland, Oregon, U.S.

- U.S. National Register of Historic Places
- U.S. Historic district – Contributing property
- Portland Historic Landmark
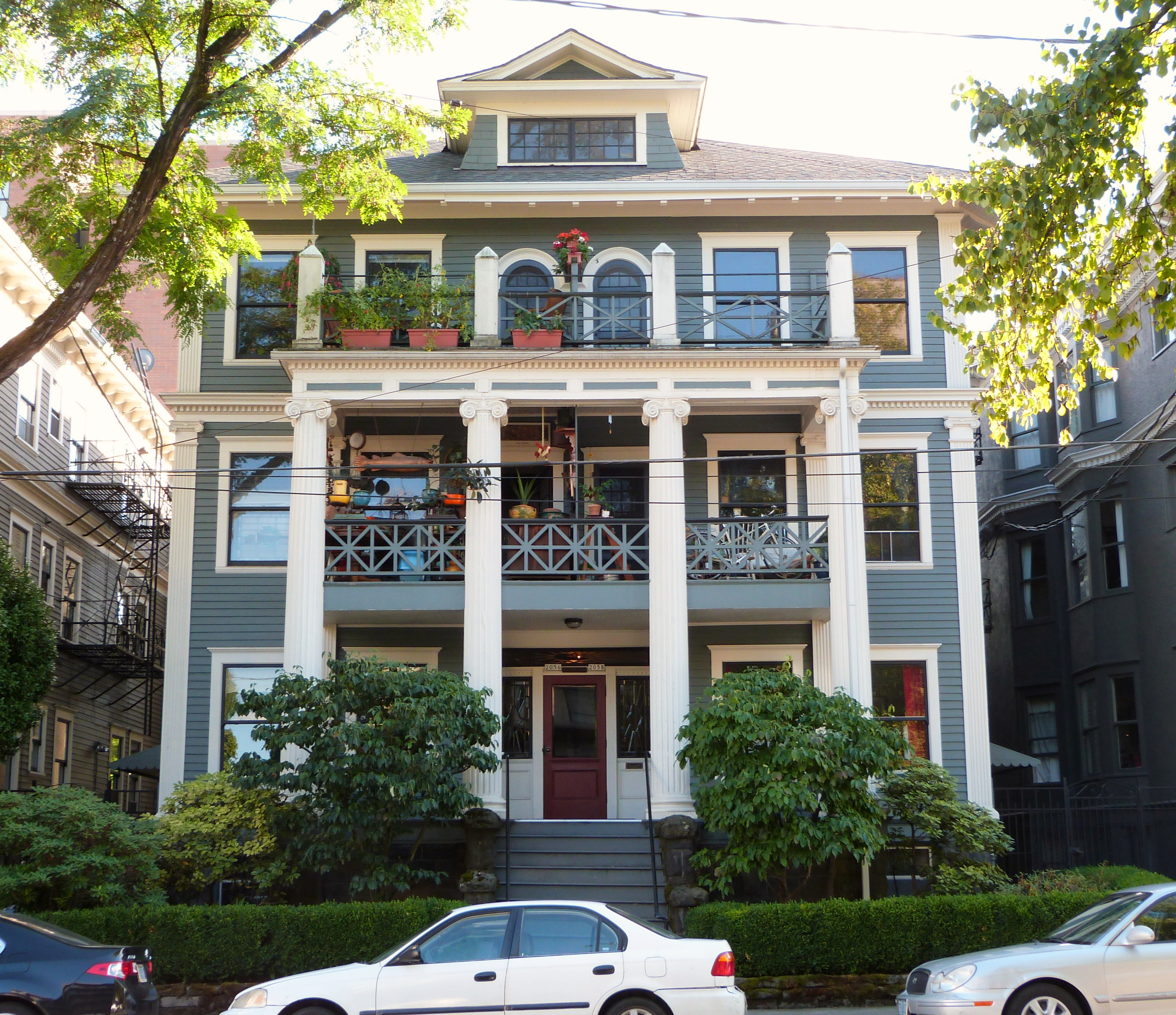
- The Dayton Apartment Building in 2013

- Location within Portland, Oregon Location within Oregon Location within the United States
- Location: 2056–2058 NW Flanders Street; Portland, Oregon
- Coordinates: 45°31′31″N 122°41′37″W
- Built: 1907
- Architect: Fliedner & Boyce Morgan
- Architectural style: Colonial Revival
- Part of: Alphabet Historic District (ID00001293)
- NRHP reference No.: 81000515
- Added to NRHP: December 21, 1981

The Dayton Apartment Building is a building located in northwest Portland, Oregon listed on the National Register of Historic Places.

== See also ==
- National Register of Historic Places listings in Northwest Portland, Oregon
