= J. H. Peterson Machine Shop =

Historic building in Portland, Oregon, U.S.

Coordinates: 45.5355°N 122.6883°W

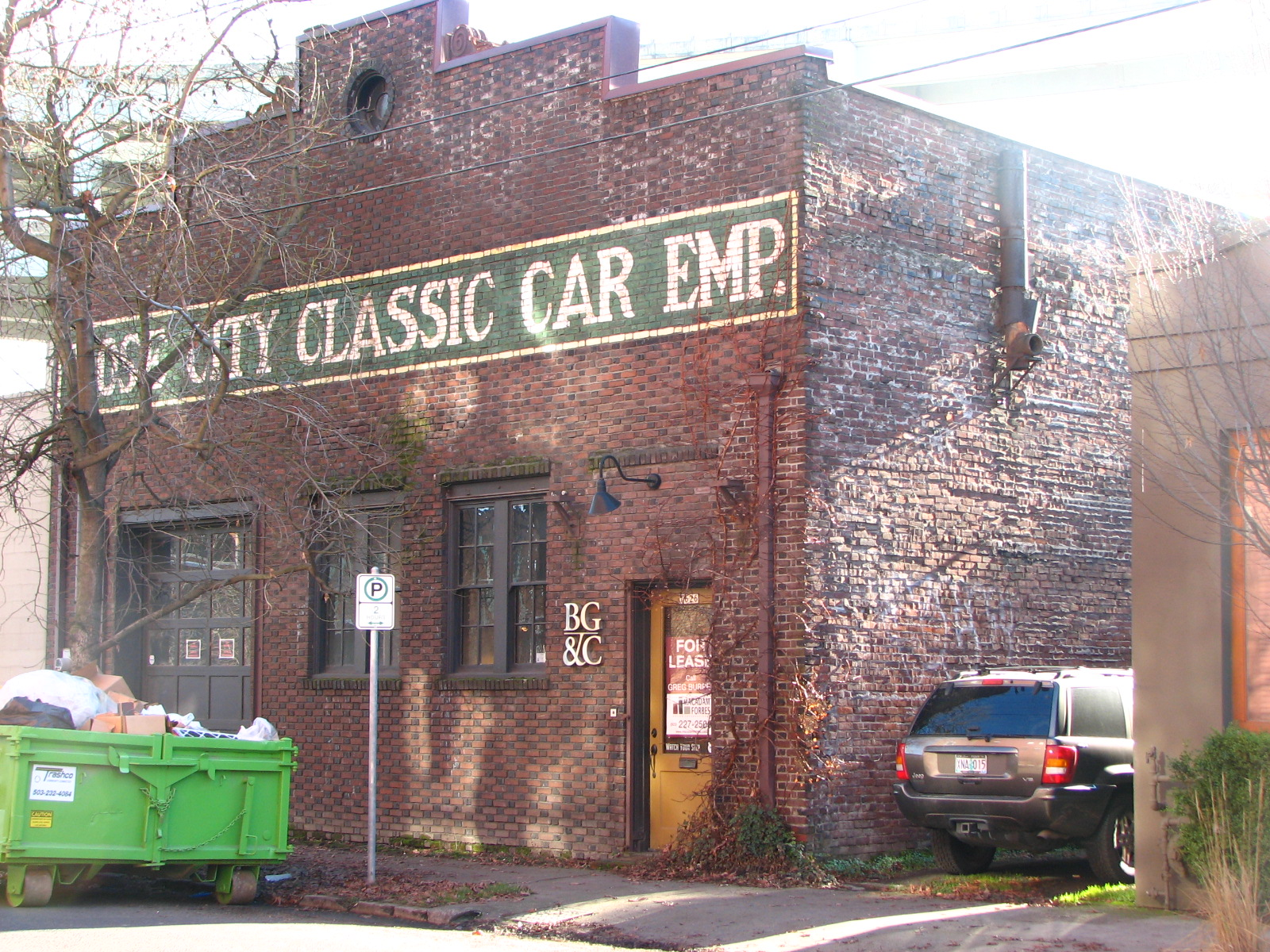
The building's exterior in 2009

The J. H. Peterson Machine Shop is a historic building in Portland, Oregon, United States. It is listed on the National Register of Historic Places.

== See also ==
- National Register of Historic Places listings in Northwest Portland, Oregon
