= Alexander B. and Anna Balch Hamilton House =

Historic building in Portland, Oregon, U.S.

- U.S. National Register of Historic Places
- Portland Historic Landmark
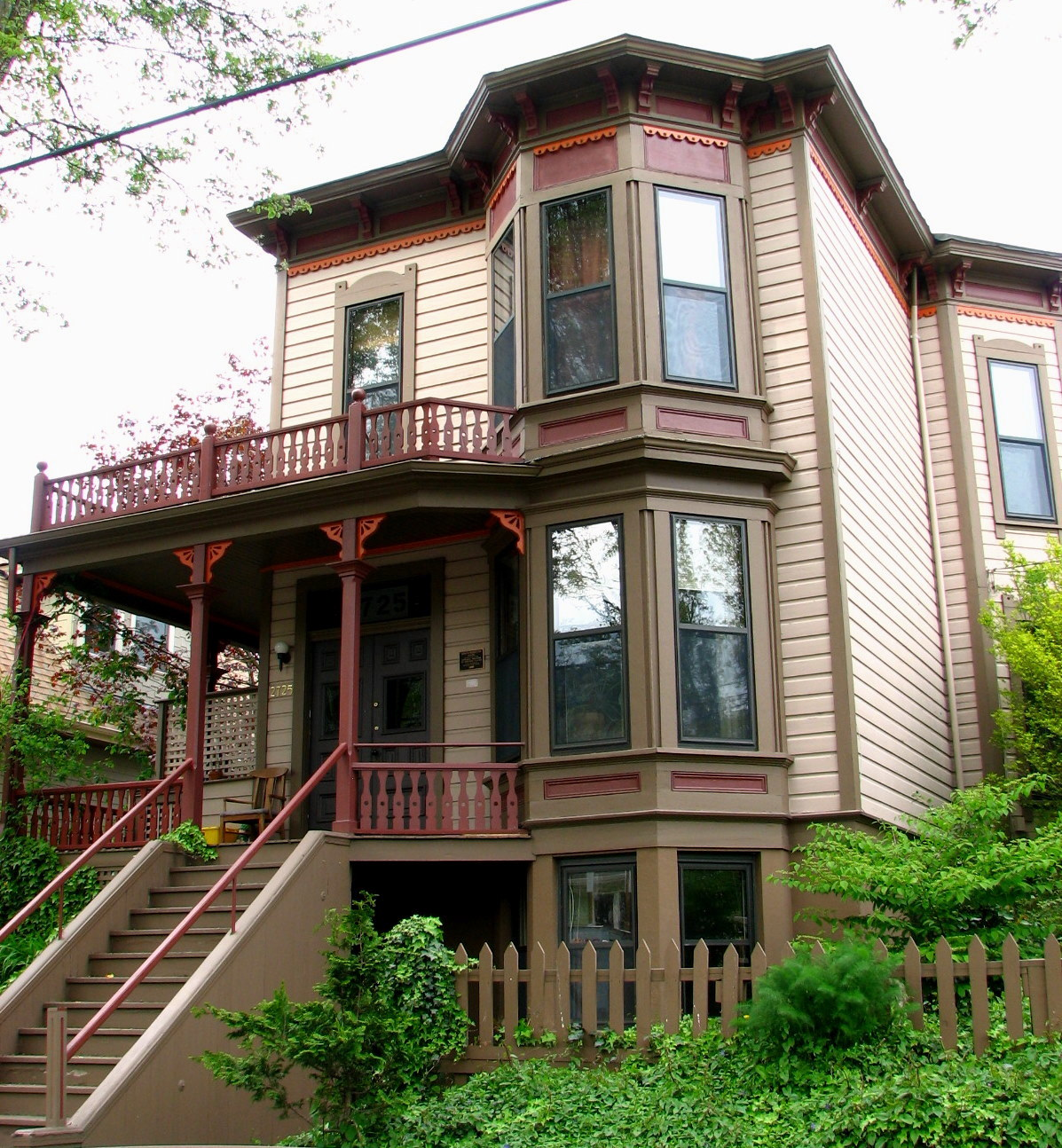

- Location within Portland, Oregon
- Location: 2723–2729 NW Savier Street; Portland, Oregon
- Coordinates: 45°32′05″N 122°42′27″W
- Built: 1890
- Architectural style: Italianate
- NRHP reference No.: 93000021
- Added to NRHP: February 11, 1993

The Alexander B. and Anna Balch Hamilton House is a house located in northwest Portland, Oregon, that is listed on the National Register of Historic Places.

== See also ==
- National Register of Historic Places listings in Northwest Portland, Oregon
