= Buck Apartment Building =

Historic building in Portland, Oregon, U.S.

- U.S. National Register of Historic Places
- U.S. Historic district – Contributing property
- Portland Historic Landmark
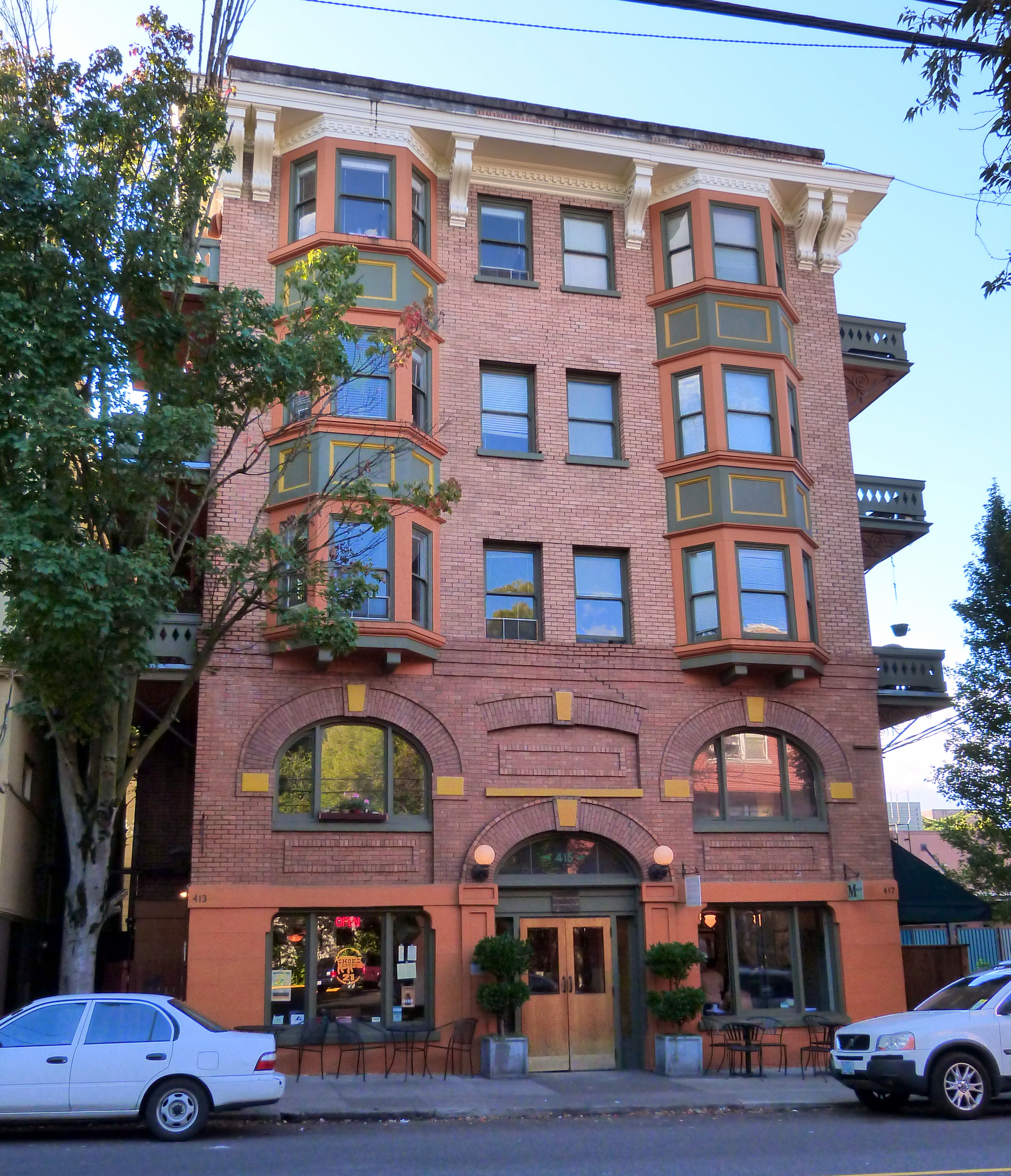
- The Buck Apartment Building in 2013

- Location within Portland, Oregon Location within Oregon Location within the United States
- Location: 415 NW 21st Avenue; Portland, Oregon
- Coordinates: 45°31′33″N 122°41′41″W
- Built: 1910
- Architect: Alexander C. Ewart
- Architectural style: Early Commercial
- Part of: Alphabet Historic District (ID00001293)
- NRHP reference No.: 90001594
- Added to NRHP: October 25, 1990

The Buck Apartment Building is a building located in northwest Portland, Oregon listed on the National Register of Historic Places.

== See also ==
- National Register of Historic Places listings in Northwest Portland, Oregon
