= American Can Company Complex =

Historic building in Portland, Oregon, U.S.

- U.S. National Register of Historic Places
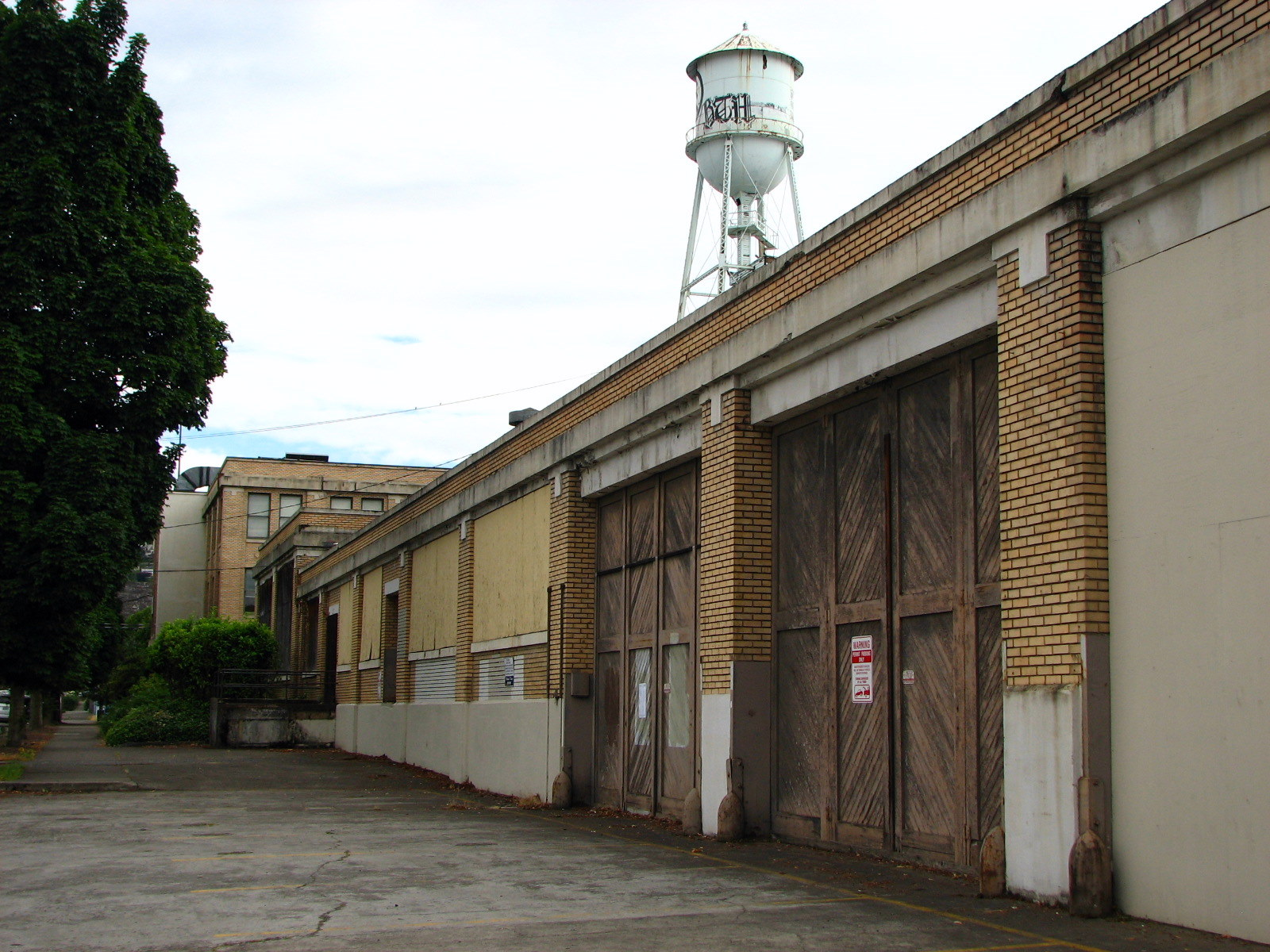
- The building's loading bays, 2009

- Location within Portland, Oregon
- Location: 2127 Northwest 26th Avenue; Portland, Oregon, U.S.
- Coordinates: 45°32′18″N 122°42′18″W
- Area: 5.9 acres (2.4 ha)
- Built: 1921
- Engineer: C.G. Preis
- Architectural style: Early Commercial
- NRHP reference No.: 96000996
- Added to NRHP: September 12, 1996

The American Can Company Complex is a historic building complex located at 2127 Northwest 26th Avenue in Portland, Oregon, that was substantially completed in 1921. It was added to the National Register of Historic Places in 1996.

The factory operated for 38 years, with production peaking during World War II. It could produce 1.5 million packing cans daily at peak production, when it employed 600 workers.

== See also ==
- National Register of Historic Places listings in Northwest Portland, Oregon
