= Otho Poole House =

Historic building in Portland, Oregon, U.S.

- U.S. National Register of Historic Places
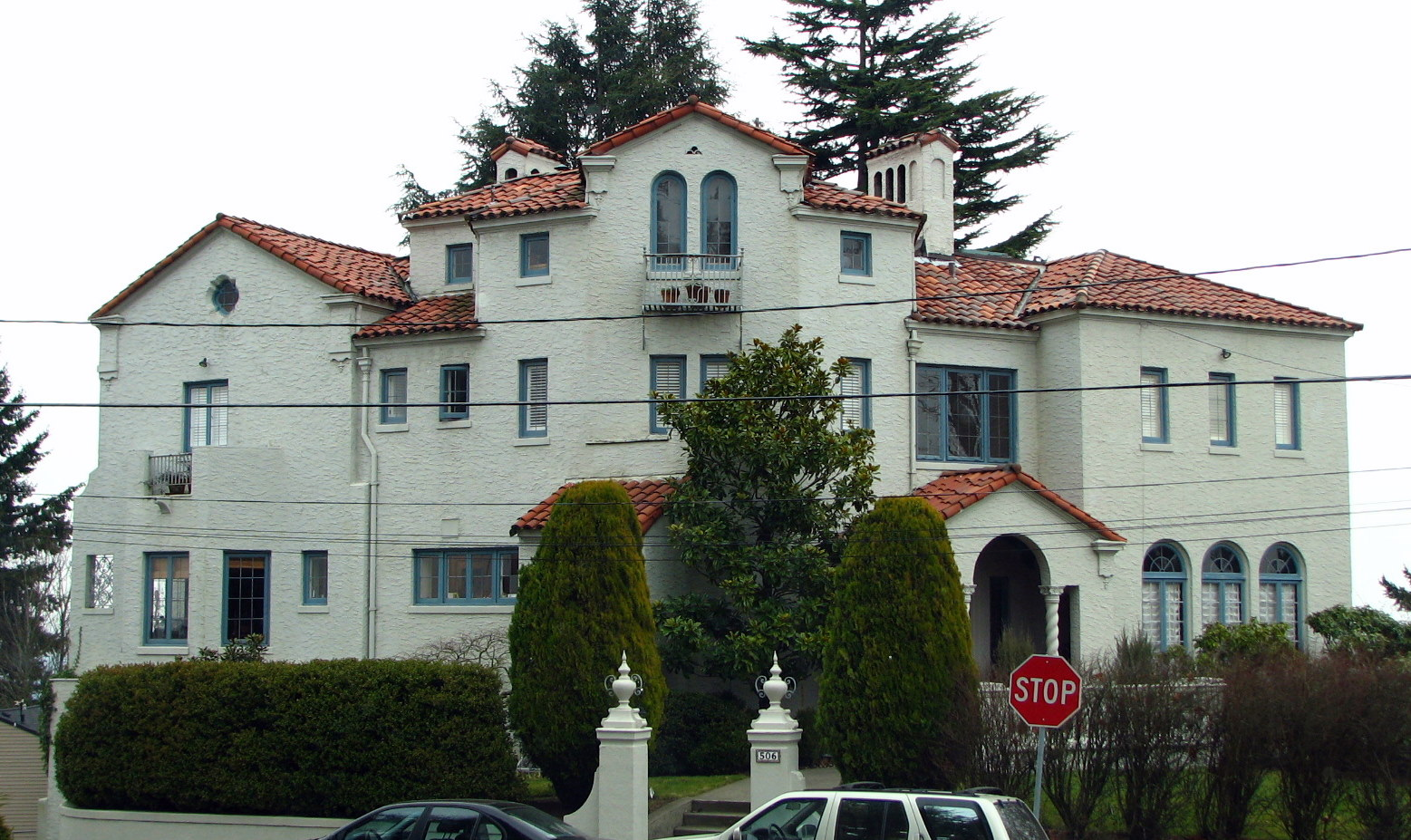
- The building's exterior in 2009

- Location within Portland, Oregon
- Location: 506 Northwest Hermosa Boulevard, Portland, Oregon
- Coordinates: 45°31′33″N 122°42′32″W
- Built: 1928
- Architect: Carl Linde
- Architectural style: Late 19th and 20th Century Revivals, Mission/Spanish Revival, Mediterranean Revival
- NRHP reference No.: 91000150
- Added to NRHP: February 28, 1991

Otho Poole House is a Spanish Revival house constructed in 1928 in northwest Portland, Oregon, United States. It was added to the National Register of Historic Places on February 28, 1991.

== See also ==
- National Register of Historic Places listings in Northwest Portland, Oregon
