= Dr. Leo Ricen House =

Historic building in Portland, Oregon, U.S.

- U.S. National Register of Historic Places
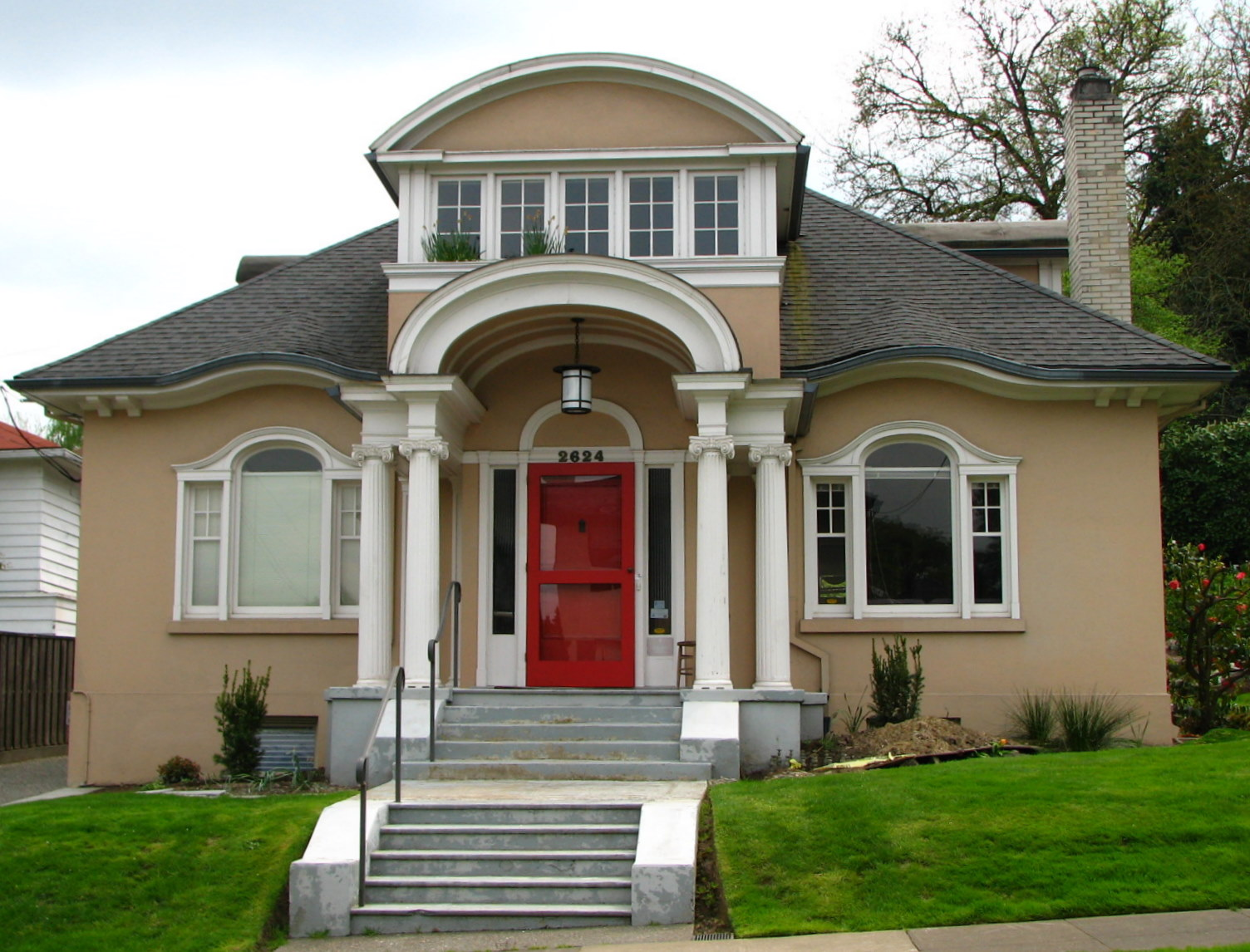

- Location within Oregon Location within the United States
- Location: 2624 NW Overton St, Portland, Oregon
- Coordinates: 45°31′55″N 122°42′15″W
- Built: 1921
- Architect: Willard F. Tobey
- Architectural style: Bungalow/Craftsman
- NRHP reference No.: 92000086
- Added to NRHP: March 9, 1992

The Dr. Leo Ricen House is a house located in northwest Portland, Oregon listed on the National Register of Historic Places.

== See also ==
- National Register of Historic Places listings in Northwest Portland, Oregon
