= Ursula K. Le Guin House =

Historic building in Portland, Oregon, U.S.

Coordinates: 45.536°N 122.7162°W

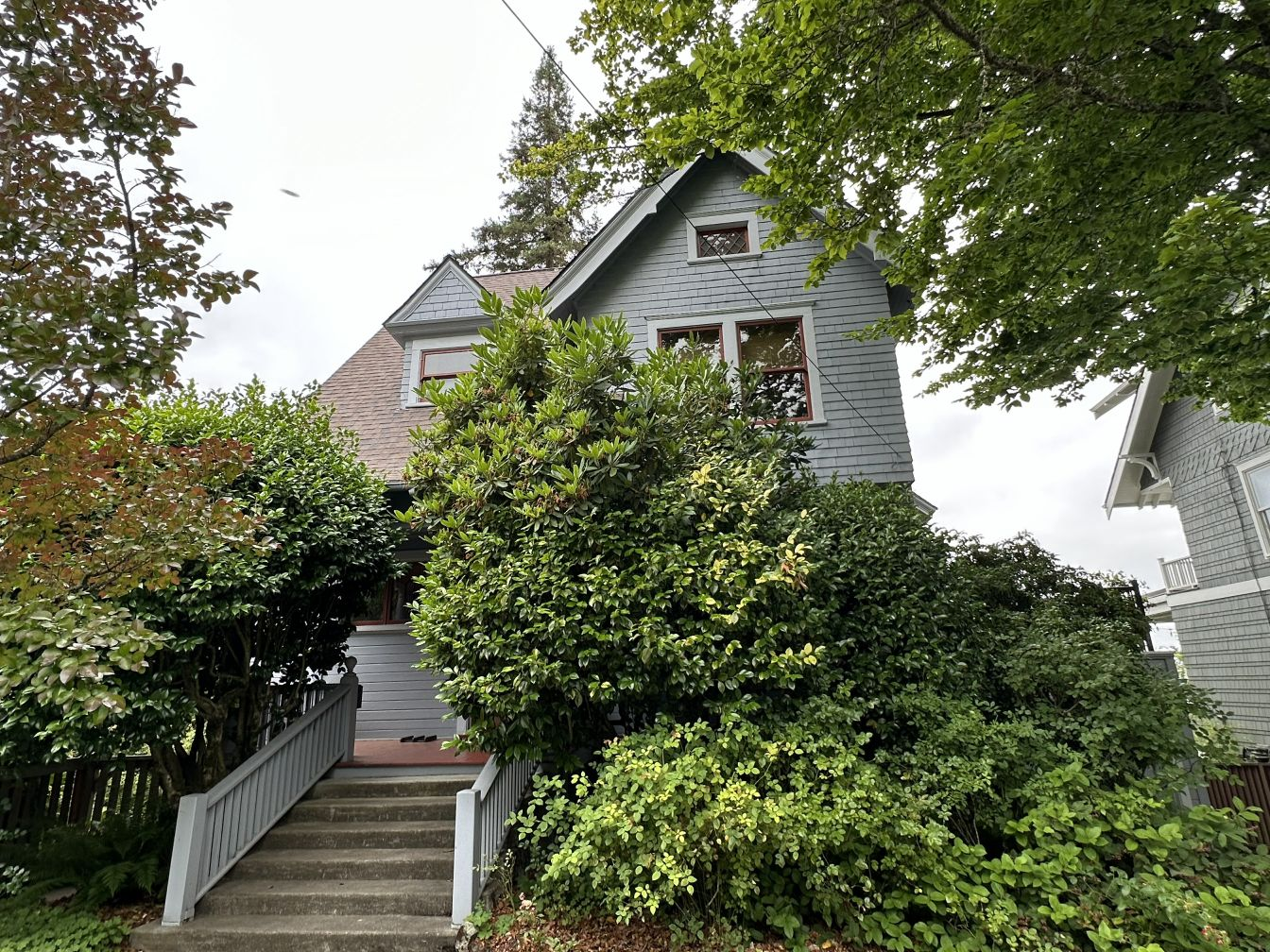
The house's exterior in 2026

The Ursula K. Le Guin House is a historic building in the Willamette Heights neighborhood of Portland, Oregon, United States. It is listed on the National Register of Historic Places.

== See also ==
- National Register of Historic Places listings in Northwest Portland, Oregon
