= Pallay Building =

Historic building in Portland, Oregon, U.S.

- U.S. National Register of Historic Places
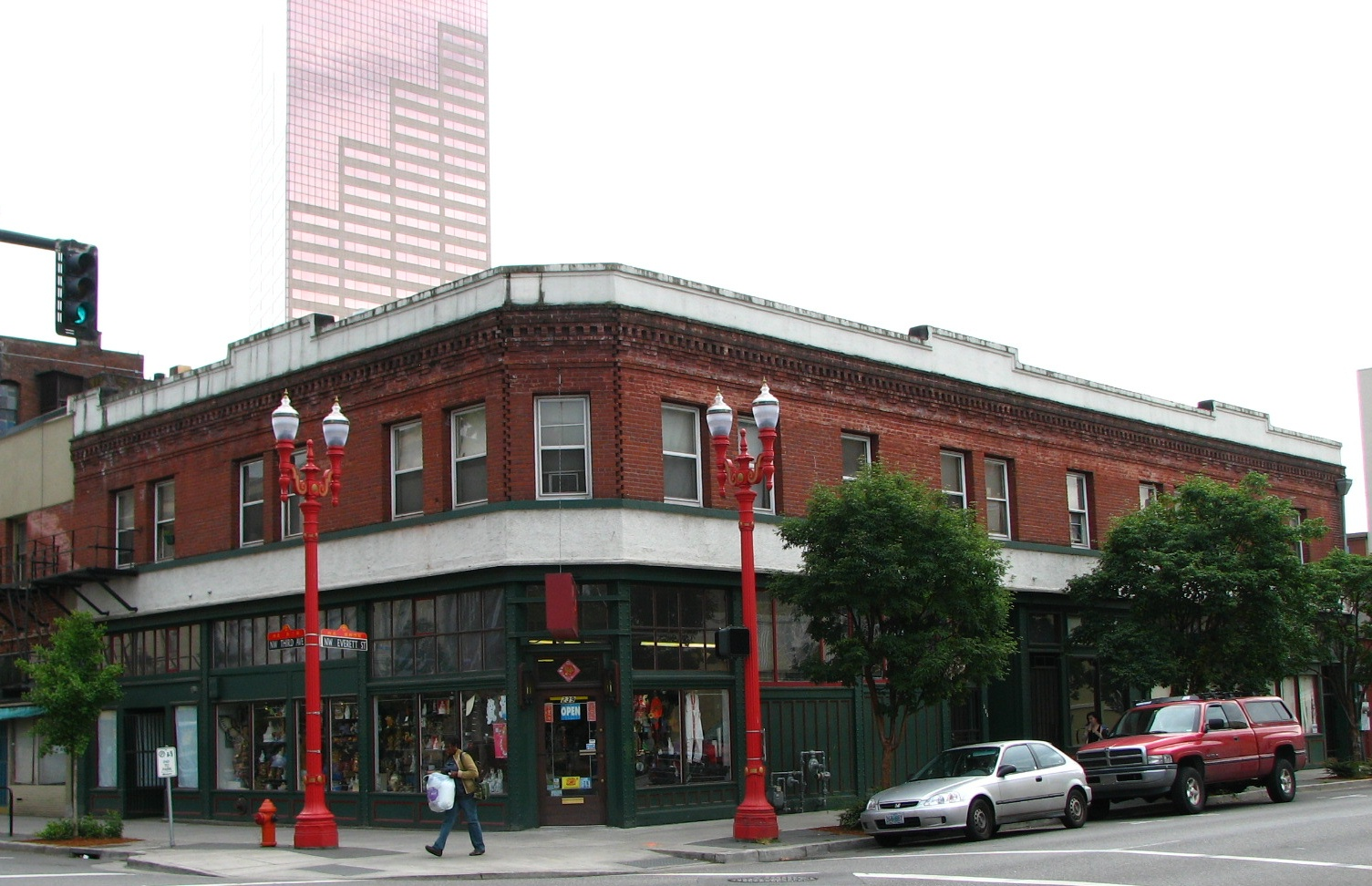
- The building's exterior in 2008

- Location within Oregon Location within the United States
- Location: 231--239 N.W. Third Ave., Portland, Oregon
- Coordinates: 45°31′31″N 122°40′20″W
- Area: less than one acre
- Architect: Alexander C. Ewart
- NRHP reference No.: 85003503
- Added to NRHP: November 8, 1985

The Pallay Building is an historic building in northwest Portland, Oregon, in the United States. It is listed on the National Register of Historic Places.

== See also ==
- National Register of Historic Places listings in Northwest Portland, Oregon
