= Oregon Casket Company Building =

Historic building in Portland, Oregon, U.S.

- The building's south façade

General information
- Coordinates: 45.5261°N 122.6758°W

The Oregon Casket Company Building is a historic building in Portland, Oregon, United States. Located in the northwest Portland part of Old Town Chinatown, it is listed on the National Register of Historic Places.

== See also ==
- National Register of Historic Places listings in Northwest Portland, Oregon
