= Sengstake Building =

Historic building in Portland, Oregon, U.S.

Coordinates: 45.52543°N 122.67732°W

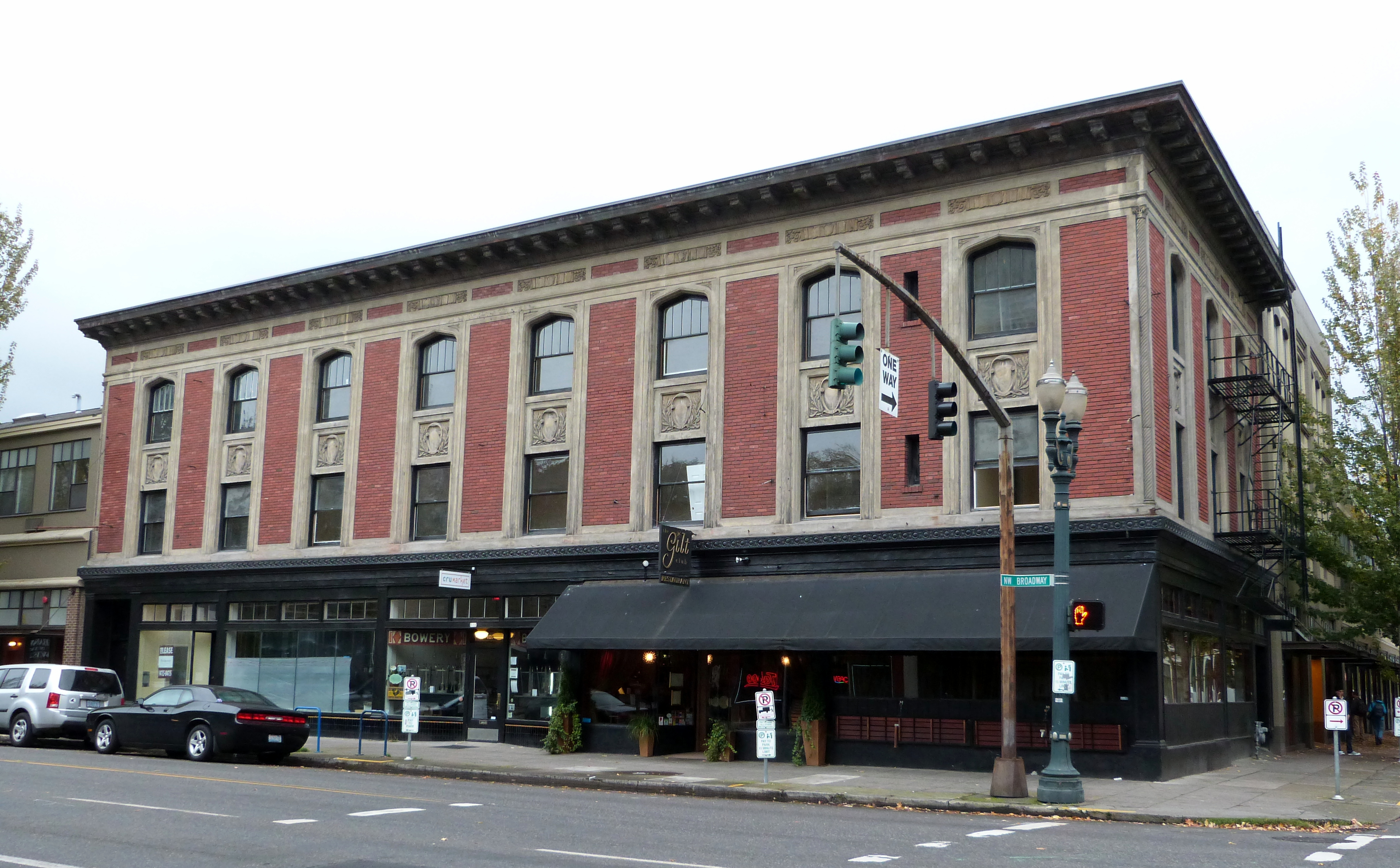
The Sengstake Building in 2012

The Sengstake Building is a building at 310 Northwest Broadway in Portland, Oregon, listed on the National Register of Historic Places. The building was added on October 31, 2012.

== See also ==
- National Register of Historic Places listings in Northwest Portland, Oregon
