= Lane–Miles Standish Company Printing Plant =

Historic building in Portland, Oregon, U.S.

- U.S. National Register of Historic Places
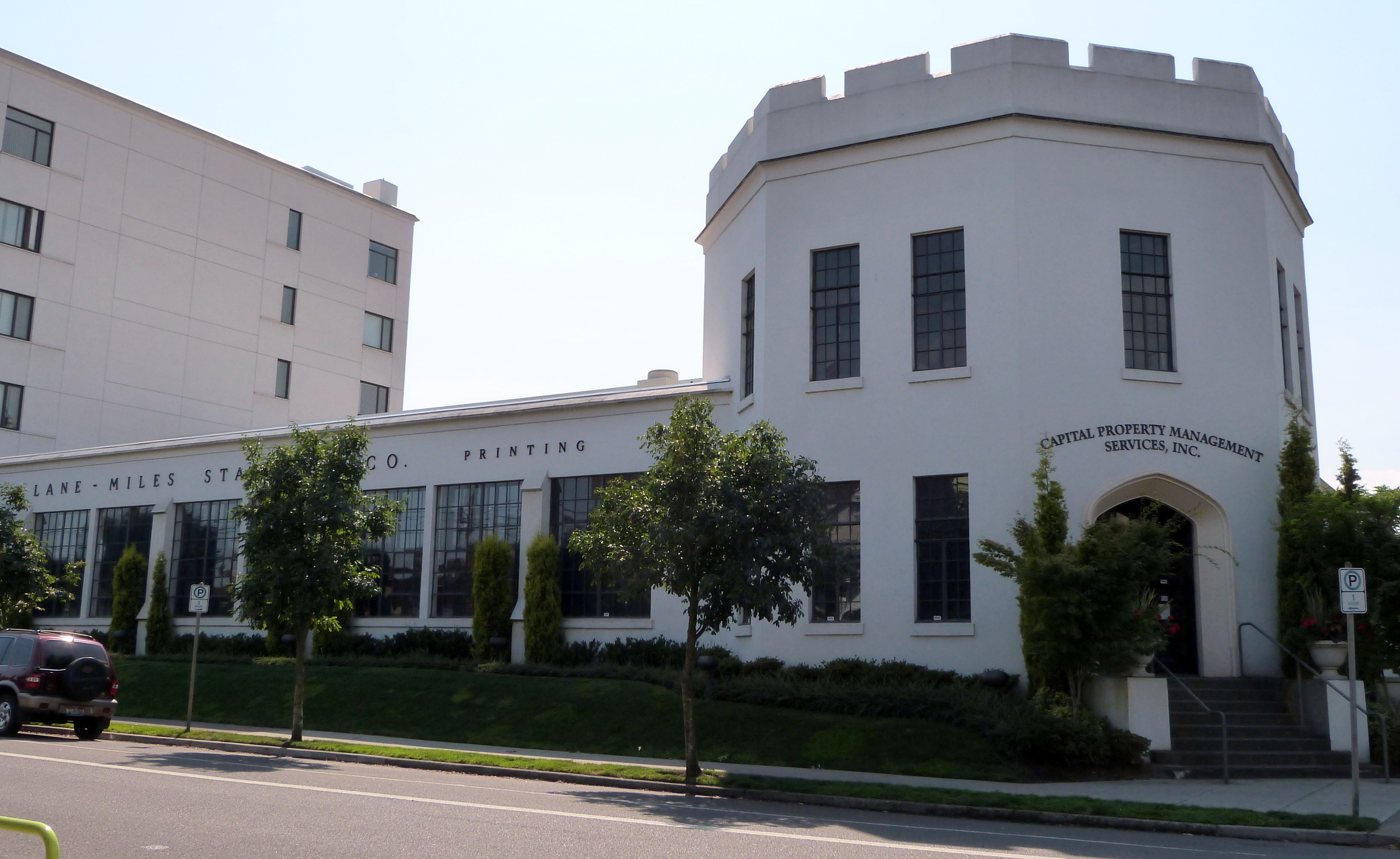
- The building in 2012

- Location within Portland, Oregon Location within Oregon Location within the United States
- Location: 1539 NW 19th Ave., Portland, Oregon
- Coordinates: 45°32′01″N 122°41′18″W
- Area: 0.6 acres (0.24 ha)
- Built: 1929
- Architect: Austin Co.
- Architectural style: Late Gothic Revival
- NRHP reference No.: 07000262
- Added to NRHP: March 27, 2007

The Lane–Miles Standish Printing Plant is a building in Portland, Oregon. It was commissioned by Alan Lane and Miles Standish, successful businessmen in the printing industry who created the Lane–Miles Standish Printing Company, and designed by the Cleveland-based Austin Company in 1929. It is an example of late gothic revival architecture, which originated in Europe. The building was originally used as a printing plant but now is used by a management and design company. It is also now connected to a newer apartment building called Lane 1919.

== Description ==
Located at 1539 NW 19th Avenue in Portland, the main building is two stories high with its prominent feature being its castellated rooftop situated atop the main entrance to the building. It also has features inspired by the late gothic revival architecture movement. These features include the previously mentioned castellated rooftop, buttresses and divided window panels. Most of these features are toned down from their European counterparts, like the small white buttresses, which pale in comparison to a building like the Reims Cathedral in France. The exterior is mostly white with some black outlines. Although not used for printing anymore, it still bears the name of the old company adding to the historical context of the building to this day. The main building is about 13,000 square feet and has an apartment building to the side called Lane 1919 that was constructed in 2006.

== History ==
The Lane–Miles Standish Printing Company began in 1919 and was started by Alan Lane and Miles Standish, two businessmen. In 1929, they commissioned the building to have a new facility for their company. The late gothic revival architecture idea came from Alan Lane, who was reminded of buildings from his childhood in the area where he grew up. The building is still owned by the surviving relatives of the founders and is now used by a different company not related to the printing business. The building was also recognized by the National Register of Historic Places (NRHP) in March 2007.
