= Ellis F. Lawrence =

American architect (1879–1946)

- Born: November 13, 1879; Malden, Massachusetts, U.S.
- Died: February 27, 1946 (aged 66); Portland, Oregon, U.S.
- Occupation: Architect
- Buildings: Jordan Schnitzer Museum of Art; Elsinore Theater

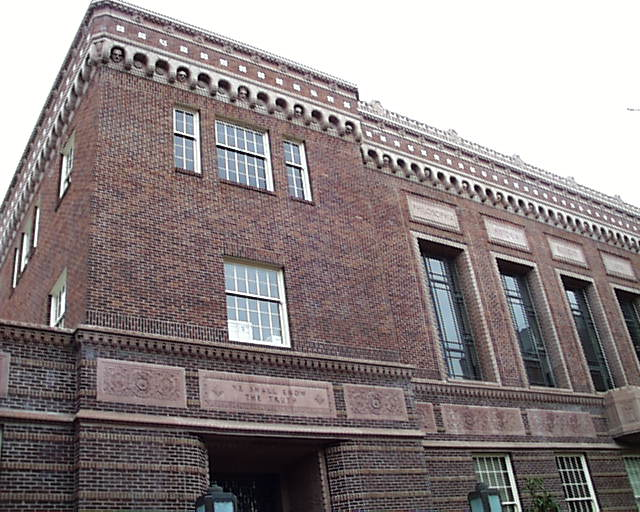
East entrance of Knight Library in Eugene, Oregon

Ellis Fuller Lawrence (November 13, 1879 – February 27, 1946) was an American architect who worked primarily in the U.S. state of Oregon. In 1914, he became the co-founder and first dean of the University of Oregon's School of Architecture and Allied Arts, a position he held until his death.

Lawrence concurrently served as campus architect for the University of Oregon and designed many campus buildings, including Knight Library and the Jordan Schnitzer Museum of Art. Lawrence Hall on the university campus (which replaced his Architecture and Art Building of 1923) was named in his honor in 1956. His body of over 500 projects includes churches, residences, commercial and industrial buildings, funerary buildings, multi-family residences, and public buildings.

In 1988, the private residence he designed for Thomas A. Livesley, a prominent Salem, Oregon businessman and civic leader, was purchased through private donations and donated to the state and now serves as the Governor's official residence (Mahonia Hall).

== Biography ==
Ellis F. Lawrence was born in Malden, Massachusetts and received his secondary education at Phillips Academy in Andover, Massachusetts graduating in 1897. He received both his bachelor's and master's degrees at the Massachusetts Institute of Technology (MIT), the first school of architecture in the United States. After graduation in 1902, Lawrence worked for the Boston architectural firms Peabody & Stearns and Andrews, Jaques & Rantoul as well as for architects John Calvin Stevens and Constant-Désiré Despradelle before he left to travel in Europe. He was employed by the Boston architectural firm Codman & Despradelle in 1905.

In 1906, Codman & Despradelle (Boston), sent Lawrence to San Francisco to commence work there, but the 1906 San Francisco earthquake convinced him to stay in Portland, Oregon where he had stopped on the way. He lived in Portland the rest of his life and commuted to his work as dean and campus architect in Eugene.

He was associated with several Oregon-based architecture firms: MacNaughton, Raymond & Lawrence (1906–1910); Lawrence & Holford (1913–1928); Lawrence, Holford, Allyn & Bean (1928–1933); and Lawrence, Holford, & Allyn (1933–1941). Lawrence's final partnership, Lawrence & Lawrence (1944–1946), was with his son, Henry Abbott Lawrence.

== Buildings designed by Lawrence ==
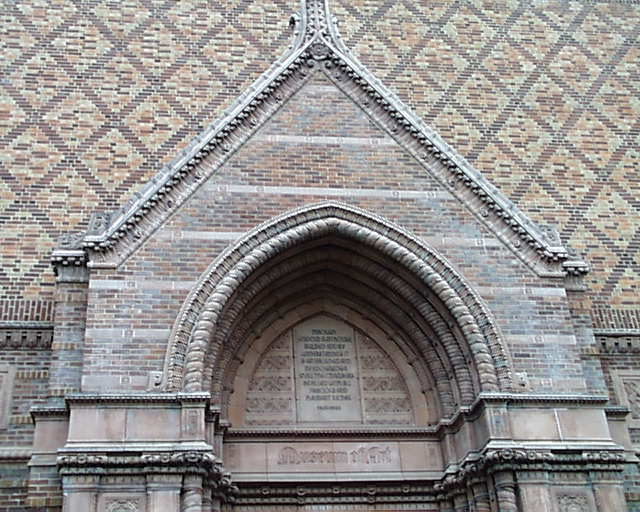
Detail of Jordan Schnitzer Museum of Art entrance

=== On the National Register of Historic Places ===
==== Eugene, Oregon ====
- Alpha Phi Sorority House, University of Oregon
- Chambers House
- Knight Library, University of Oregon
- Hope Abbey Mausoleum
- Jordan Schnitzer Museum of Art, University of Oregon
- Women's Memorial Quadrangle (includes Gerlinger Hall, Susan Campbell Hall, and Hendricks Hall), University of Oregon

==== Portland, Oregon ====
- Belle Court Apartments
- Cumberland Apartments
- Henry B. Dickson House
- Lewis T. Gilliland House
- Albert, Oscar, and Linda Heintz House
- Dr. Harry M. Hendershott House
- James Hickey House
- Irvington Tennis Club
- William H. Lewis Model House
- Alexander D. McDougall House
- Natt and Christena McDougall House
- Henry B. Miller House
- Paul C. Murphy House
- Isaac Neuberger House
- Harry T. Nicolai House
- John V. G. Posey House
- O. L. Price House
- Samuel G. Reed House
- Maurice Seitz House
- Blaine Smith House
- Stanley C.E. Smith House
- Arthur Champlin Spencer and Margaret Fenton Spencer House
- John A. Sprouse Jr. House
- Alice Henderson Strong House
- Fred E. Taylor House
- Troy Laundry Building
- Wells-Guthrie House
- James E. Wheeler House

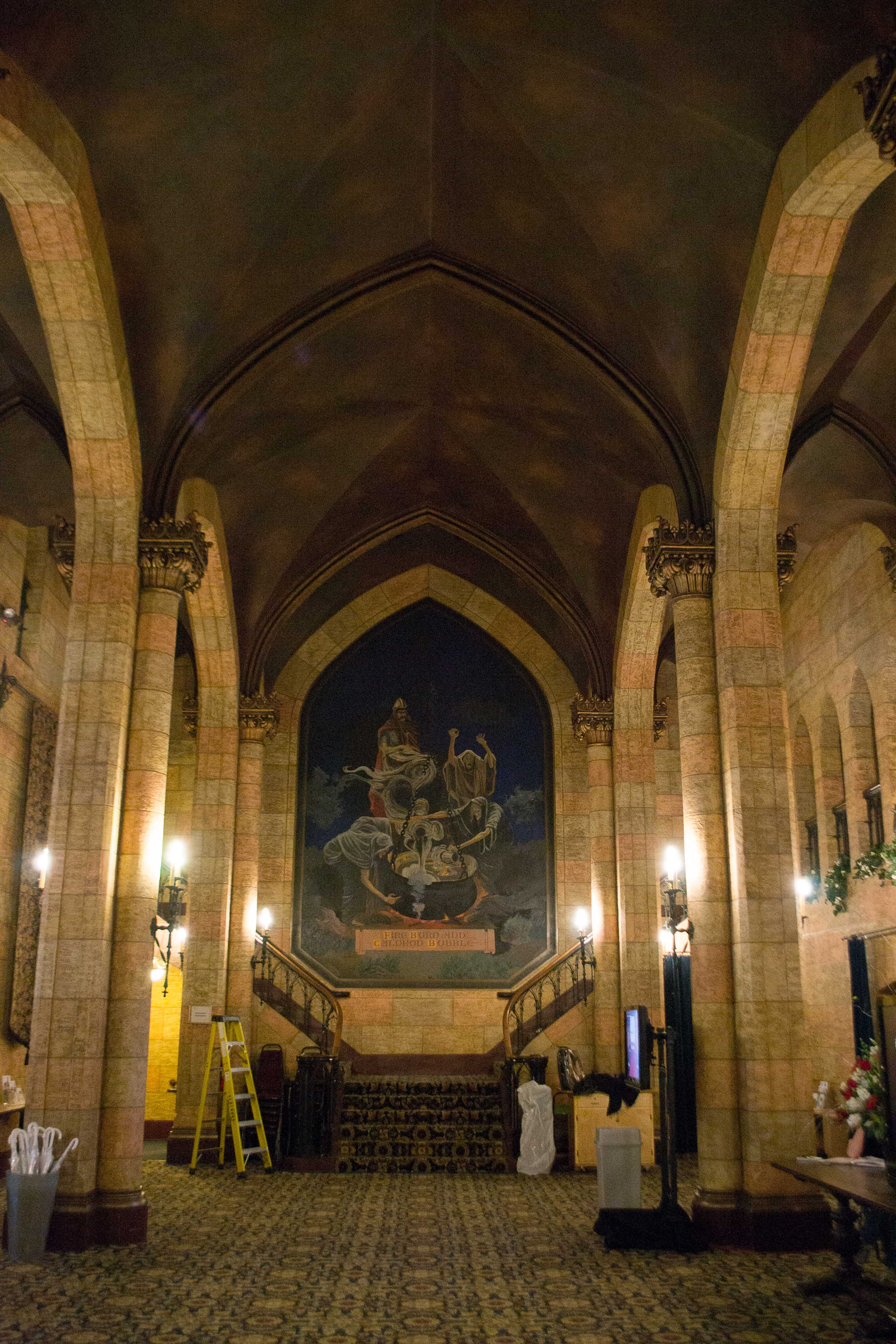
Interior of the Elsinore Theatre

- The Earl Bronaugh House

==== Other Oregon NRHP structures ====
- Old Kappa Alpha Theta Sorority House, Corvallis
- James M. and Paul R. Kelty House, Lafayette
- Leaburg Powerhouse, part of the Leaburg Hydroelectric Project Historic District, Leaburg
- Hall–Chaney House, Milwaukie
- Elsinore Theater, Salem
- Mahonia Hall, (Oregon Governor's mansion), Salem

=== Other buildings ===
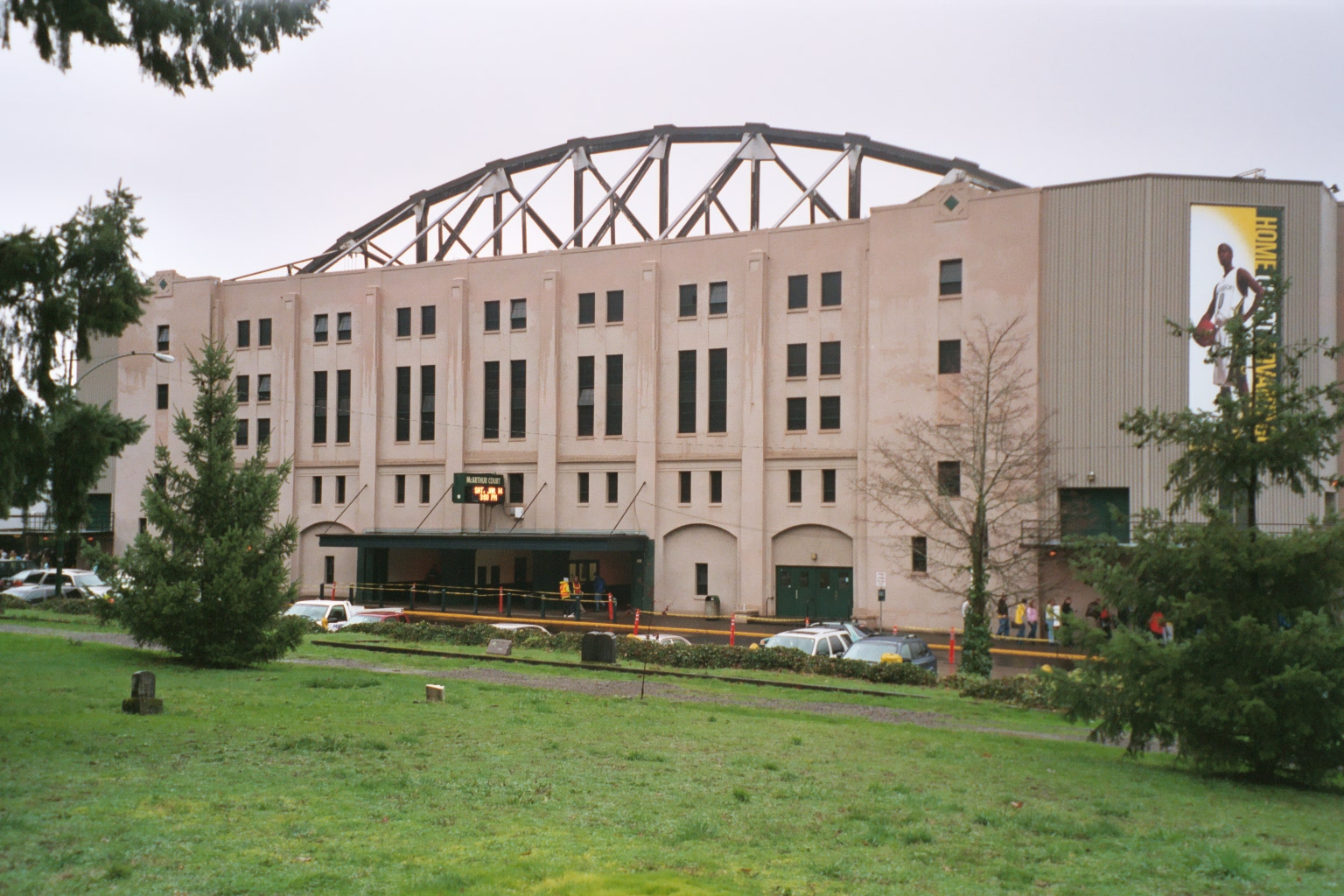
McArthur Court

- Baker Middle School, Baker City
- Cooley House, Lewis and Clark College, Portland
- Franklin Building, Salem, contributing structure to the Salem Downtown Historic District
- Martin House, Eugene
- McArthur Court, University of Oregon, Eugene
- Mount Crest Abbey Mausoleum, Salem
- Ocean View Abbey Mausoleum, Astoria
- Alpha Epsilon Pi fraternity house, Eugene
- Donald R. Newberry House, Medford, Oregon
- John Hughes house, Salem Oregon
- Prentiss Hall, Whitman College, Walla Walla, Washington
- Hunter Conservatory, Whitman College, Walla Walla, Washington

== See also ==
- National Register of Historic Places listings in Oregon
