= Blaine Smith House =

Historic building in Portland, Oregon, U.S.

- U.S. National Register of Historic Places
- Portland Historic Landmark
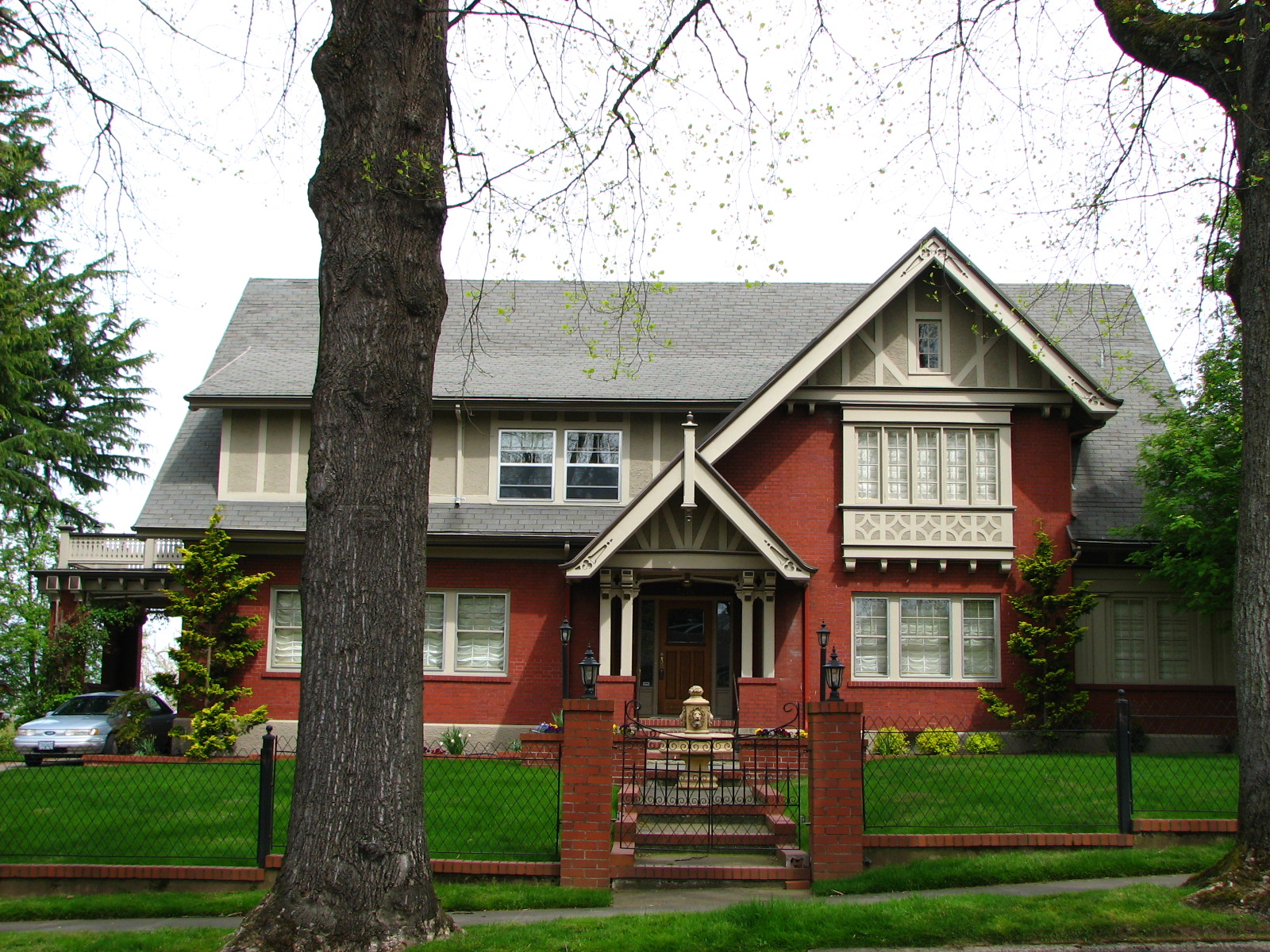
- The house's exterior in 2008

- Location within Portland, Oregon Location within Oregon Location within the United States
- Location: 5219 SE Belmont Street; Portland, Oregon
- Coordinates: 45°31′01″N 122°36′33″W
- Area: 0.5 acres (0.20 ha)
- Built: 1909
- Architect: MacNaughton, Raymond & Lawrence
- Architectural style: Arts and Crafts, Jacobethan, Tudor Revival
- MPS: Architecture of Ellis F. Lawrence MPS
- NRHP reference No.: 91000798
- Added to NRHP: June 19, 1991

The Blaine Smith House in southeast Portland in the U.S. state of Oregon, is a two-story single dwelling listed on the National Register of Historic Places. Built in 1909 in an Arts and Crafts architectural style, it was added to the register in 1991.

Rectangular in plan, the 40-by-60-foot (12 by 18 m) house has a full basement and an attic. Single-story projections include a porte-cochère, a front entrance, and a sun porch. A steeply pitched gable roof, imitation half-timbering on the second floor, brick and stucco surfaces, and dormers on the front and rear are among the exterior features of the structure. A circular drive approaches the front of the house, and a separate drive on the west enters the porte cochère. Outbuildings on the 0.49-acre (0.20 ha) property include an historic, detached, three-bay garage and a gazebo of late 20th-century construction.

Rooms on the first floor radiate from a central hall that runs through the house to the main staircase. Flanking the central hall toward the front of the house are the living and dining rooms. Behind the dining room are the kitchen and a back hall leading to the maid's stairs, the basement stairs, and a door to the backyard. Behind the living room is a reception room connected to the porte cochère, and off this room or foyer is a half-bath.

On the second floor, five bedrooms and two bathrooms are arranged around a large landing. At the landing's far end, stairs lead to the attic, which has two additional bedrooms, a bath, and a kitchen. The basement has a game room, a workroom, and a bath. Interior features include oak paneling, coffered ceilings, ceramic tile chimney fronts, and other decorations consistent with the Arts and Crafts style.

Blaine Smith (1870–1935), a long-time Portland resident, was associated with the Old Western Clay Manufacturing Company. He and his wife, Lillian, were the original owners of the property and lived in the house with their three children. Smith changed jobs and moved to Seattle in 1914, and the Smiths sold the property in 1919.

Ellis F. Lawrence (1879–1946), whose Portland firm designed the house, was a prominent architect, city planner, and teacher. In 1914, he founded the University of Oregon School of Architecture and Allied Arts, where he taught and served as dean while also maintaining his office in Portland.

== See also ==
- National Register of Historic Places listings in Southeast Portland, Oregon
