= Lawrence & Holford =

Lawrence & Holford was an architectural firm based in the U.S. state of Oregon, formed by Ellis F. Lawrence and William G. Holford and established in 1913. The firm designed many buildings that are listed on the National Register of Historic Places (NRHP).

== Works on the NRHP in Oregon ==
- Alpha Phi Sorority House, 1050 Hilyard St, Eugene
- Fred E. Chambers House and Grounds, 1151 Irving Rd, Eugene
- Elsinore Theater, 170 High St SE, Salem
- Hall–Chaney House, 10200 SE Cambridge Lane, Milwaukie
- Dr. Harry M. Hendershott House, 824 NW Albemarle Terrace, Portland
- James Hickey House, 6719 SE 29th Ave, Portland
- James M. and Paul R. Kelty House, 675 3rd St, Lafayette
- T. A. Livesley House, 533 Lincoln St S, Salem
- Paul C. Murphy House, 3574 E Burnside St, Portland
- Isaac Neuberger House, 630 NW Alpine Terrace, Portland
- John V. G. Posey House, 2107 SW Greenwood Rd, Portland
- O. L. Price House, 2681 SW Buena Vista Dr, Portland
- Maurice Seitz House, 1495 SW Clifton St, Portland
- Stanley C. E. Smith House, 1905 SW Greenwood Rd, Portland
- John A. Sprouse, Jr. House, 2826 NW Cumberland Rd, Portland
- St. John's Episcopal Church, 110 NE Alder St, Toledo (attributed to Lawrence, Holford & Allyn)
- Frank C. Stettler House, 2606 NW Lovejoy St, Portland
- Fred E. Taylor House, 2873 NW Shenandoah Terrace, Portland
- University of Oregon Library and Memorial Quadrangle, Kincaid St at E 15th Ave, Eugene (attributed to Lawrence, Holford, Allyn & Bean)
- Women's Memorial Quadrangle Ensemble, bounded by University St, Johnson Lane and Pioneer Cemetery, University of Oregon campus, Eugene
