= Irvington Tennis Club =

Historic building in Portland, Oregon, U.S.

- U.S. National Register of Historic Places
- U.S. Historic district – Contributing property
- Portland Historic Landmark
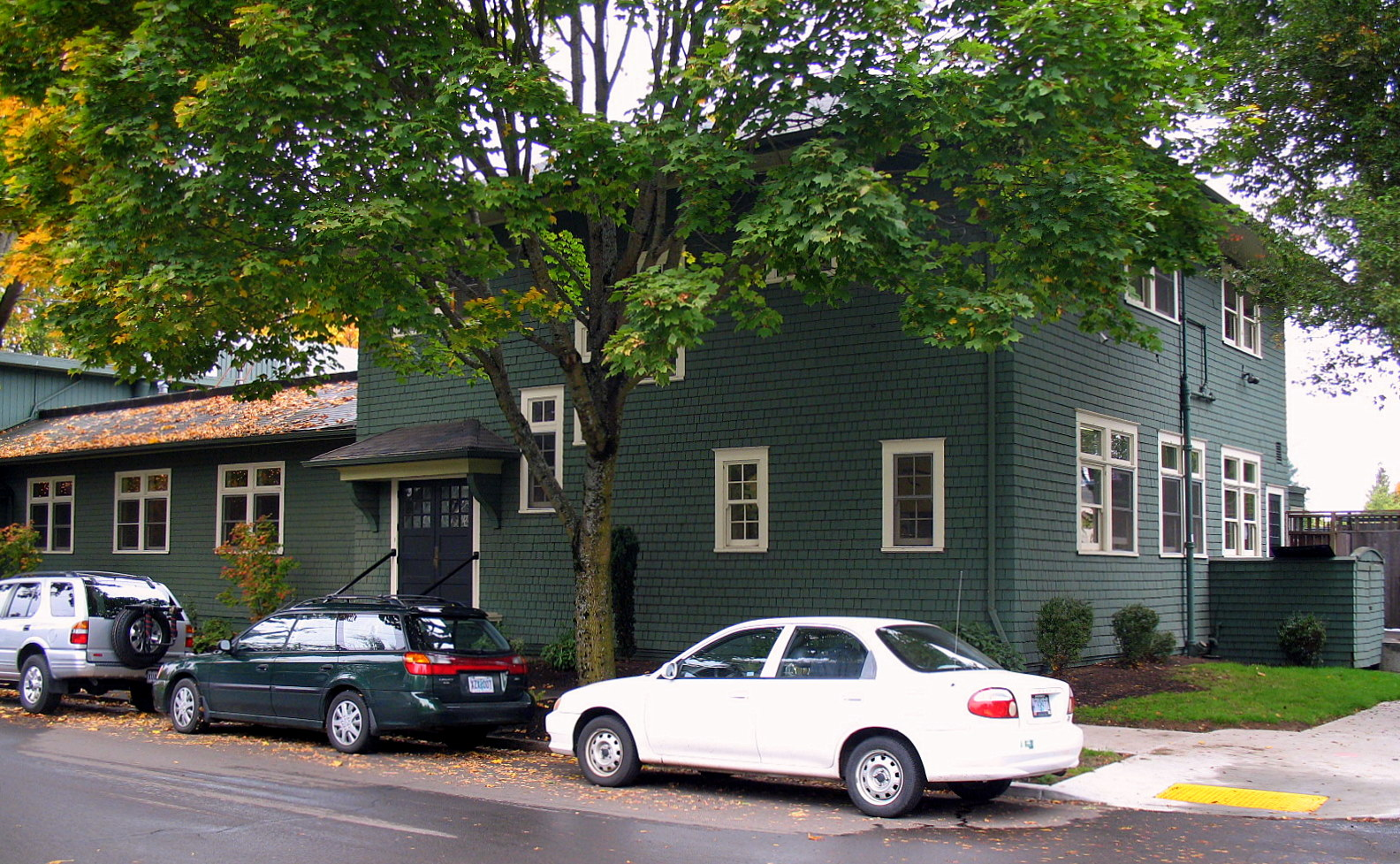

- Location within Portland, Oregon
- Location: 2131 NE Thompson Street; Portland, Oregon
- Coordinates: 45°32′21″N 122°38′37″W
- Area: less than one acre
- Built: 1911
- Architect: Ellis F. Lawrence
- Architectural style: Bungalow/craftsman
- Part of: Irvington Historic District (ID10000850)
- MPS: Architecture of Ellis F. Lawrence MPS
- NRHP reference No.: 90001513
- Added to NRHP: October 17, 1990

The Irvington Tennis Club, located in northeast Portland, Oregon, is listed on the National Register of Historic Places. It was established in 1898 in the historic Irvington neighborhood.

== See also ==
- National Register of Historic Places listings in Northeast Portland, Oregon
