= Alice Henderson Strong House =

Historic building in Portland, Oregon, U.S.

- U.S. National Register of Historic Places
- Portland Historic Landmark
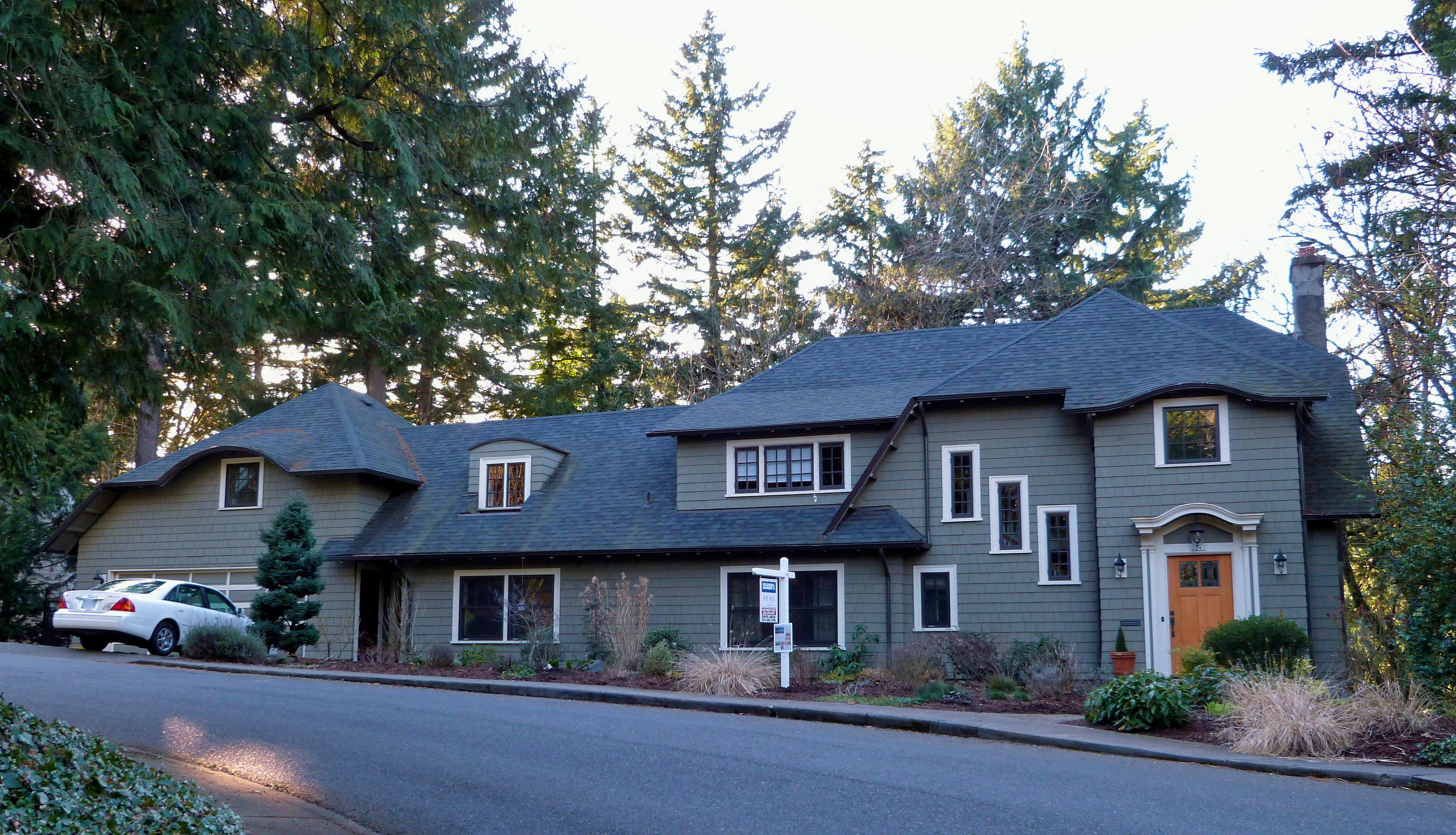
- The Strong House in 2013

- Location within Portland, Oregon
- Location: 2241 SW Montgomery Drive; Portland, Oregon
- Coordinates: 45°30′43″N 122°42′04″W
- Area: less than one acre
- Built: 1912
- Architect: Ellis F. Lawrence
- Architectural style: Arts & Crafts; English cottage
- MPS: Architecture of Ellis F. Lawrence MPS
- NRHP reference No.: 90001520
- Added to NRHP: October 17, 1990

The Alice Henderson Strong House is a house located in southwest Portland, Oregon listed on the National Register of Historic Places.

== See also ==
- National Register of Historic Places listings in Southwest Portland, Oregon
