= Lewis T. Gilliland House =

Historic building in Portland, Oregon, U.S.

- U.S. National Register of Historic Places
- U.S. Historic district – Contributing property
- Portland Historic Landmark
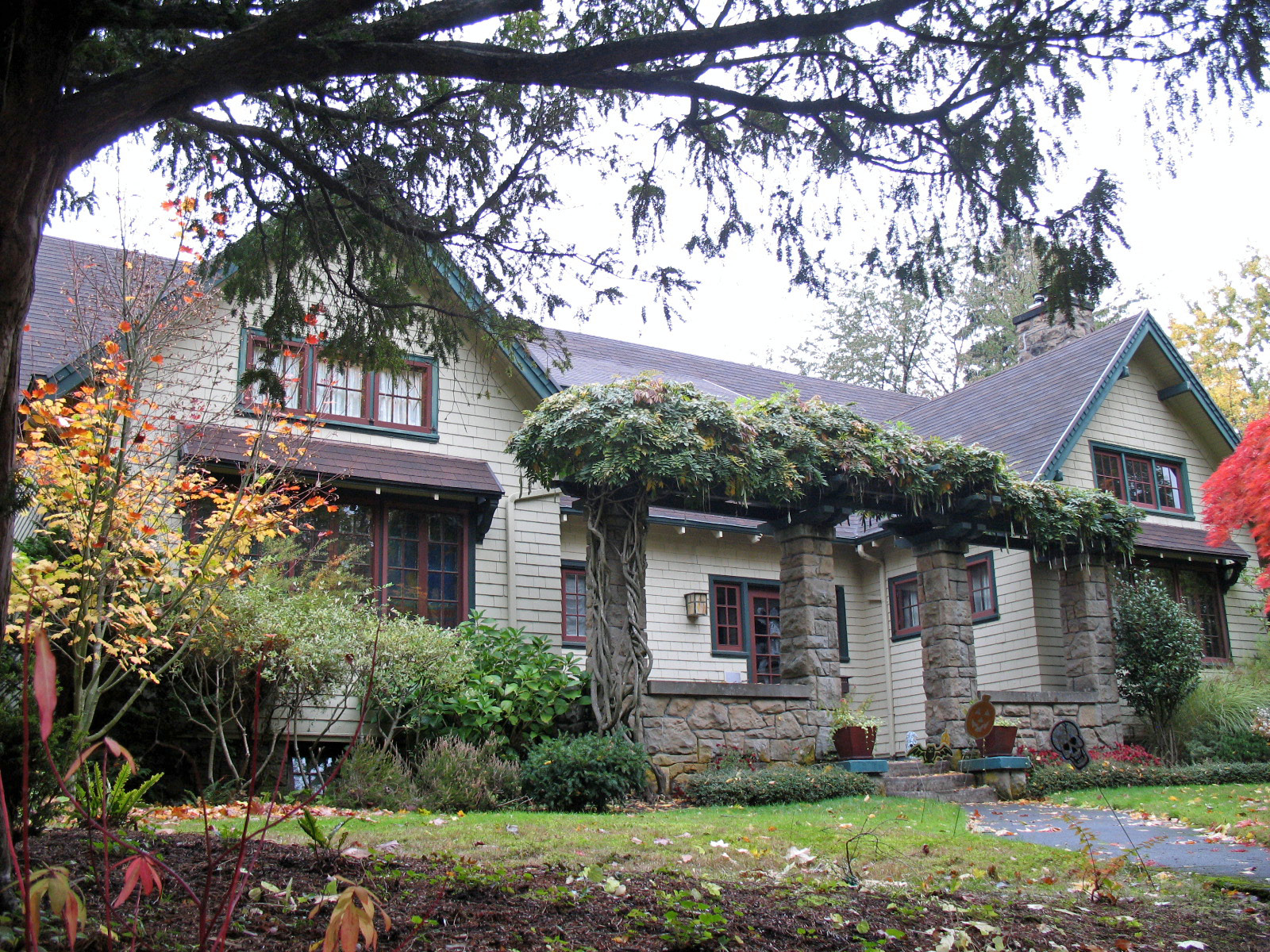
- The house in 2009

- Location within the United States Location within Oregon Location within Portland, Oregon
- Location: 2229 NE Brazee Street; Portland, Oregon
- Coordinates: 45°32′27″N 122°38′33″W
- Built: 1910
- Architect: Ellis F. Lawrence
- Architectural style: American Craftsman
- Part of: Irvington Historic District (ID10000850)
- NRHP reference No.: 89000063
- Added to NRHP: February 23, 1989

The Lewis T. Gilliland House is a historic residence in Portland, Oregon, United States. An excellent 1910 example of the American Craftsman style, it was designed by prominent Portland architect Ellis F. Lawrence by closely adapting plans published by Gustav Stickley. (Note: Specifically, Lawrence based the Gilliland House on "A Bungalow of Irregular Form and Unusually Interesting Construction", published by Stickley in Craftsman Homes (1909).) Stickley was the leading national exponent of Craftsman architecture, and no other work by Lawrence so precisely captures Stickley's aesthetic.

The house was entered on the National Register of Historic Places in 1989.

== See also ==
- National Register of Historic Places listings in Northeast Portland, Oregon
