= Henry B. Miller House =

Historic building in Portland, Oregon, U.S.

- U.S. National Register of Historic Places
- Portland Historic Landmark
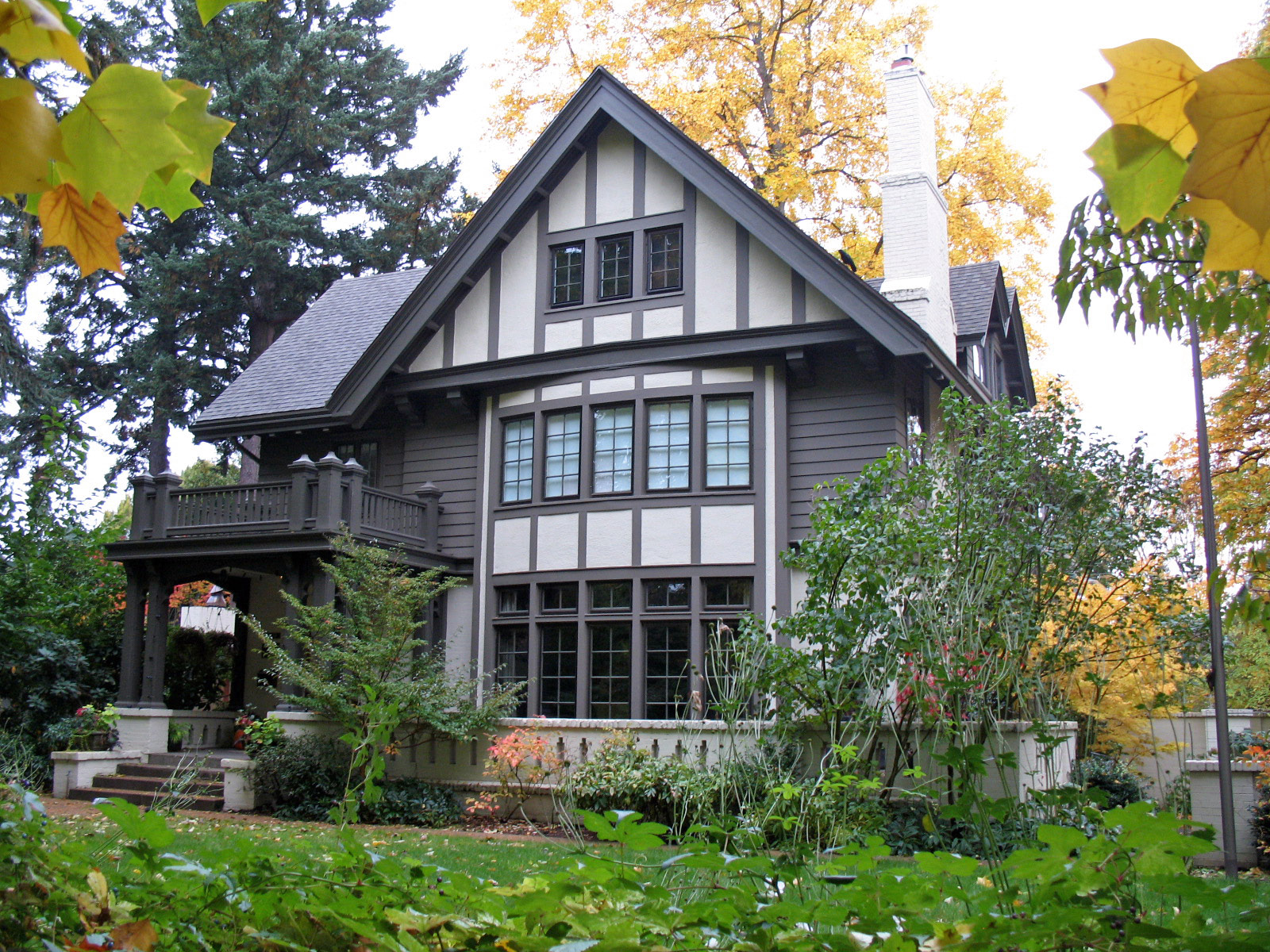

- Location within Portland, Oregon
- Location: 2439 NE 21st Avenue; Portland, Oregon
- Coordinates: 45°32′25″N 122°38′41″W
- Area: 0.3 acres (0.12 ha)
- Built: 1911
- Architect: Lawrence, Ellis F.
- Architectural style: Tudor Revival
- NRHP reference No.: 89001865
- Added to NRHP: October 30, 1989

The Henry B. Miller House is located in northeast Portland, Oregon, and is listed on the National Register of Historic Places. It was built in 1911 and designed by Ellis F. Lawrence.

== See also ==
- National Register of Historic Places listings in Northeast Portland, Oregon
