= James Hickey House =

Historic building in Portland, Oregon, U.S.

- U.S. National Register of Historic Places
- Portland Historic Landmark
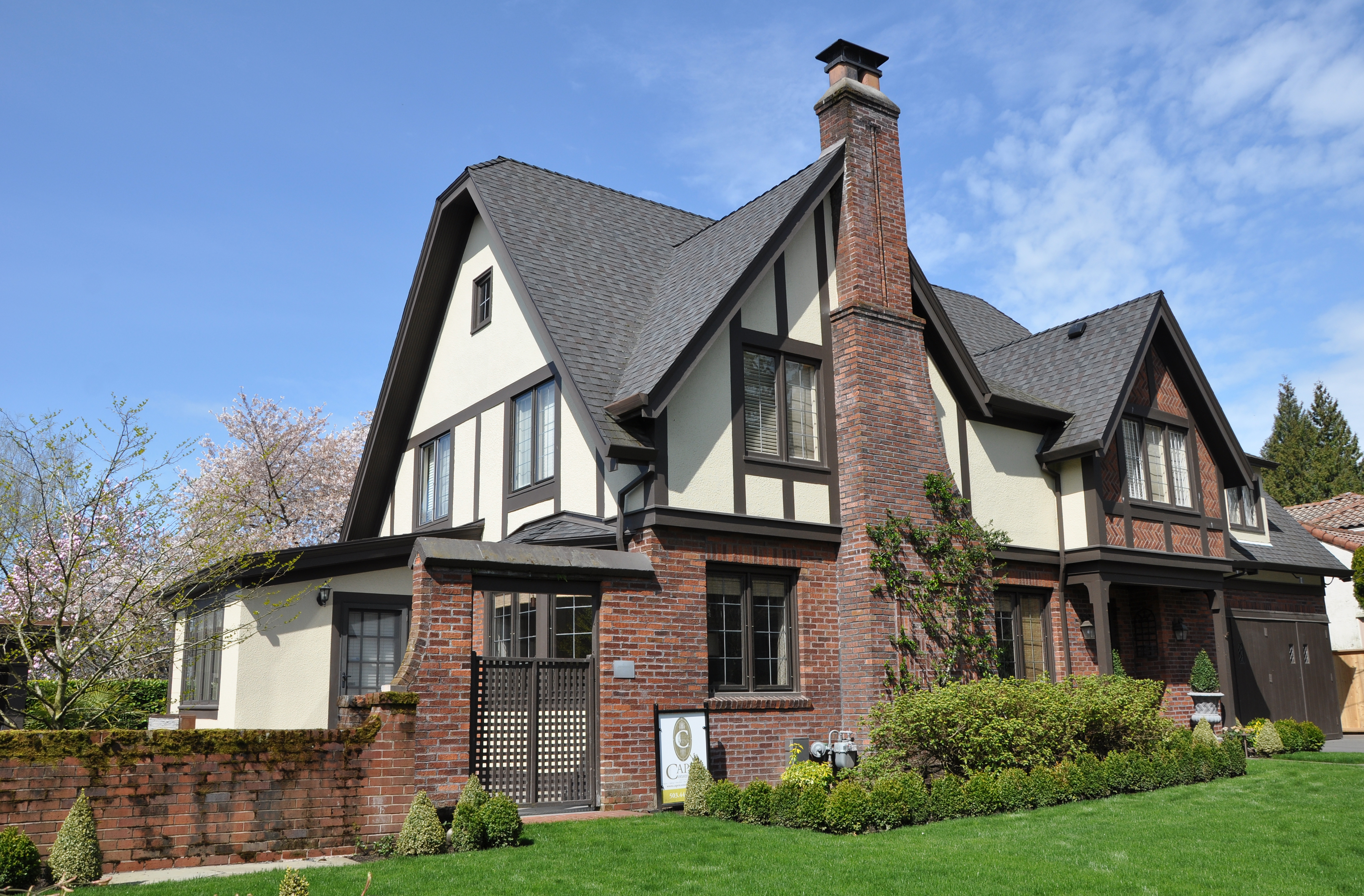
- James Hickey House in 2012

- Location within Portland, Oregon
- Location: 6719 SE 29th Avenue; Portland, Oregon
- Coordinates: 45°28′28″N 122°38′01″W
- Built: 1925
- Architect: Lawrence & Holford
- Architectural style: Tudor Revival
- MPS: Architecture of Ellis F. Lawrence MPS
- NRHP reference No.: 90001514
- Added to NRHP: October 17, 1990

The James Hickey House is a house in the Eastmoreland neighborhood of southeast Portland, Oregon. The Tudor Revival style house was finished in 1925 and was added to the National Register of Historic Places in 1990. It was built by the architectural firm Lawrence & Holford and was one of architect Ellis Lawrence's designs for a building contractor named James Hickey. The house was built with the intention of being a model home in the Eastmoreland neighborhood.

== History ==
After he moved to Portland Oregon in 1906, Ellis Lawrence designed numerous residential and nonresidential structures, around 260 of which currently survive in Washington and Oregon. He worked in a variety of architectural styles but in his middle period between 1912 and 1930 he worked mostly with Historic Period styles. This is exemplified in the Tudor Revival style of the James Hickey House. The James Hickey House is one of several houses Lawrence designed in the Eastmoreland neighborhood and it is the only house Lawrence designed in this neighborhood that has not been altered significantly. The contractor and financier James S. Hickey Sr. was born in 1893 in Milwaukee, Wisconsin and moved to Portland, Oregon in 1924. In 1925 he served as contractor for the James Hickey House which was to be his own house. James Hickey and his family lived in the James Hickey House up until the 40s.

== Description ==
The Eastmoreland neighborhood where the house is located was developed with the intention of being an upper class suburb. The house is surrounded by similarly sized houses. It is edged by small shrubs on the front, large rhododendrons on the garage side, and the facade is shaded by large maple trees. The house's living room is located on the front elevation which is uncommon in Lawrence's designs. This was likely due to the minimal view potential of the flat lot the house was built on. Some of the houses notable features include its decorative brickwork, brick and half-timber exterior surfacing, leaded glass windows and French doors, wrought iron stair railing and door hardware, and tiled living room fireplace.

=== Exterior ===
The James Hickey House is rectangular in design and has the addition of two side wings and a rear bay. The south side wing was added recently. The back yard is enclosed by a covered lattice fence which also keeps the recently added side wing from view. The house's main roof is formed by a gable with clipped north and south ends. This roof is intersected to the front by a large gable at the south end and a smaller gable which extends over the houses main entrance. The gable over the front entrance is supported by a pair of chamfered porch posts and is two stories. The house's garage has a clipped gable roof as well. The exterior of the first floor is covered in red brick and the exterior of the second floor has a half timbered surface. The off center exterior chimney contains decorative brickwork. The front door of the house which is nested underneath the two story extending gable is decorated with a hand forged handle and front plate and is in the middle of a pair of iron lanterns.

=== Interior ===
While many of the building's exterior features such as the brickwork, exterior chimney, half timbered surface, and gables exemplify the Tudor Revival style, the building's interior is more modernized and has fewer Tudor features. Some of the few Tudor Revival features of the interior are leaded glass windows, exposed beams in the living room, and a wrought iron stair railing. The house's floor is made out of oak and the stair treads are made with mahogany. There are original steam heat registers in every room of the building. The fireplace is contained in the east wall and has no mantelpiece. The rooms are organized around the entrance hall on the first floor. The first floor contains a living room, dining room, kitchen, sitting room, breakfast room and a half bath. The sitting room originally was an exterior side porch. The second floor contains three bedrooms, a library and two baths. All rooms on the second floor have sloped ceilings. The house also has a finished basement.

== See also ==
- National Register of Historic Places listings in Southeast Portland, Oregon
