= Fred E. Chambers House and Grounds =

Historic house in Oregon, United States

- U.S. National Register of Historic Places
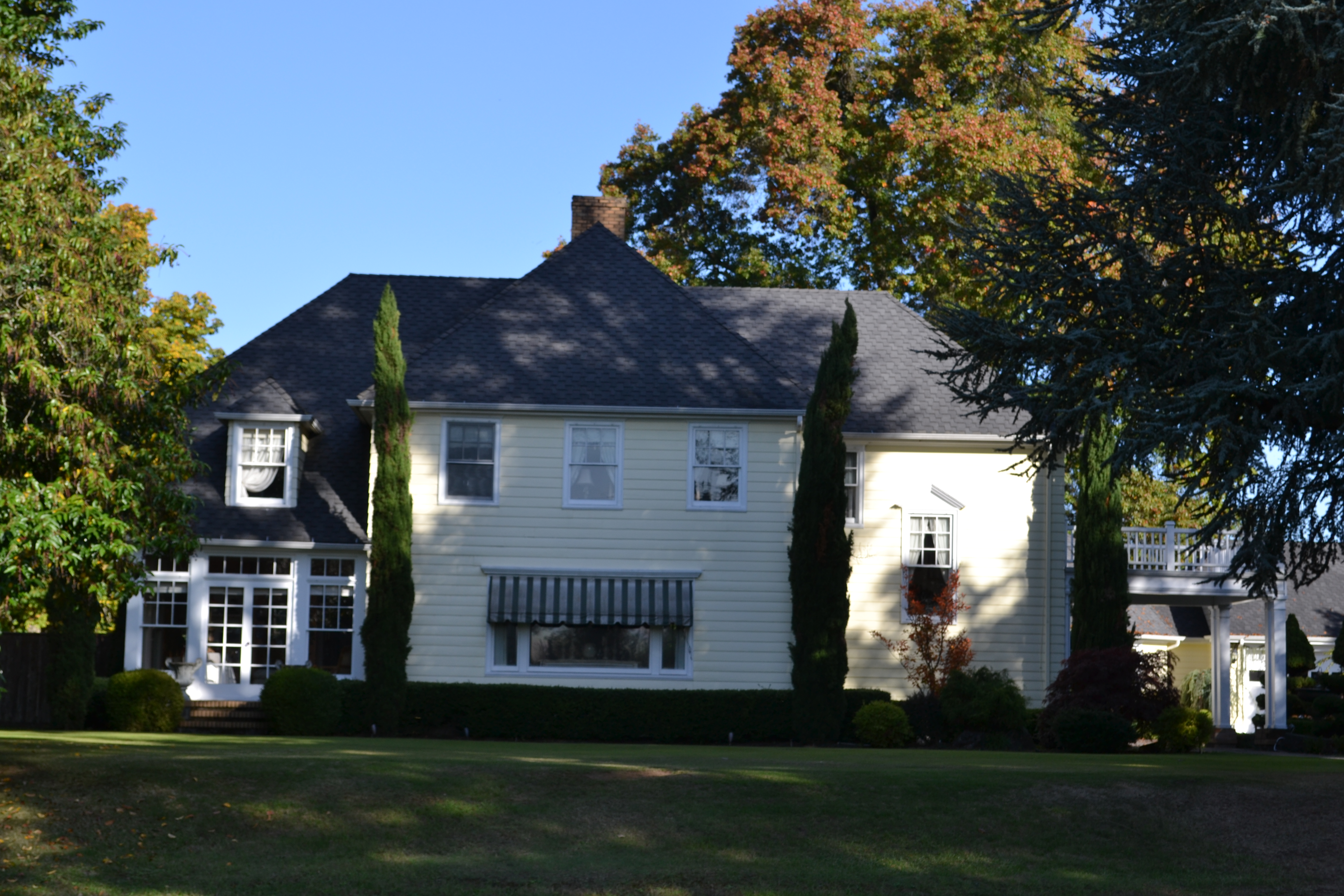

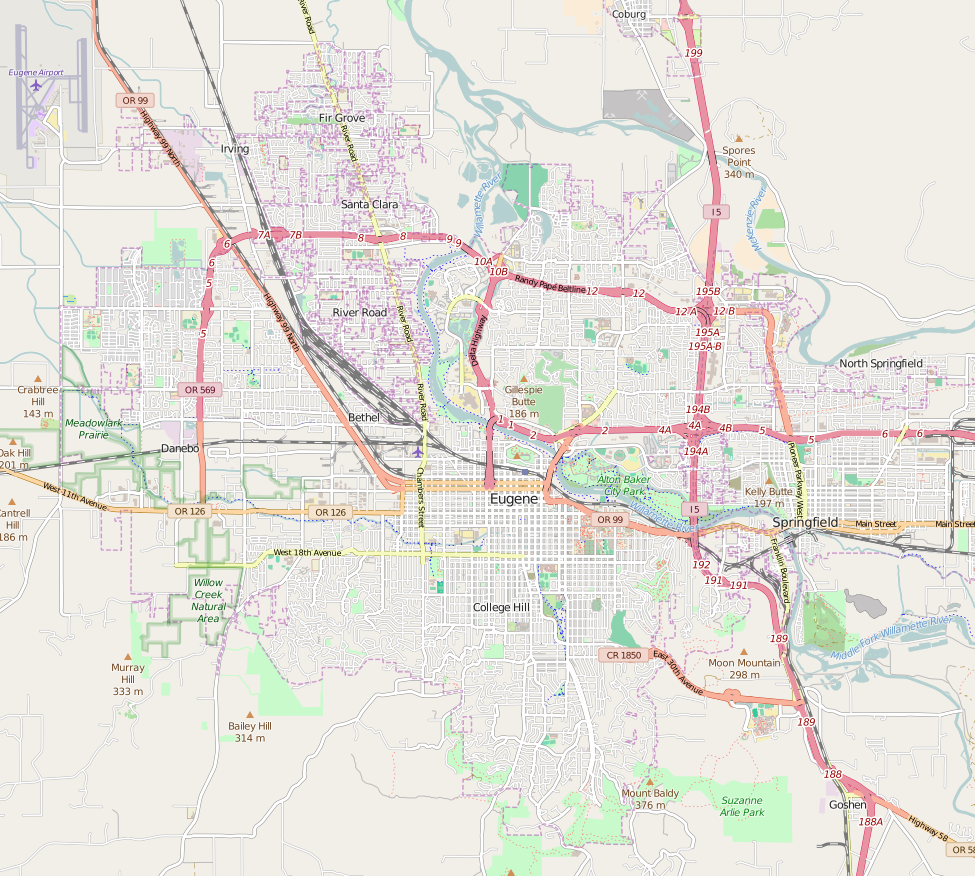
- Location within Eugene OR Location within Oregon
- Location: 1151 Irving Rd, Eugene, Oregon
- Coordinates: 44.103708°N 123.1542067°W
- Area: 2 acres (0.81 ha)
- Built: 1923
- Architect: Lawrence and Holford
- Architectural style: Colonial Revival
- MPS: Architecture of Ellis F. Lawrence MPS
- NRHP reference No.: 96001047
- Added to NRHP: September 27, 1996

The Fred E. Chambers House and Grounds, located in Eugene, Oregon, United States, is listed on the National Register of Historic Places.

== See also ==
- National Register of Historic Places listings in Lane County, Oregon
