= Arthur Champlin Spencer and Margaret Fenton Spencer House =

House in Portland, Oregon, U.S.

- U.S. National Register of Historic Places
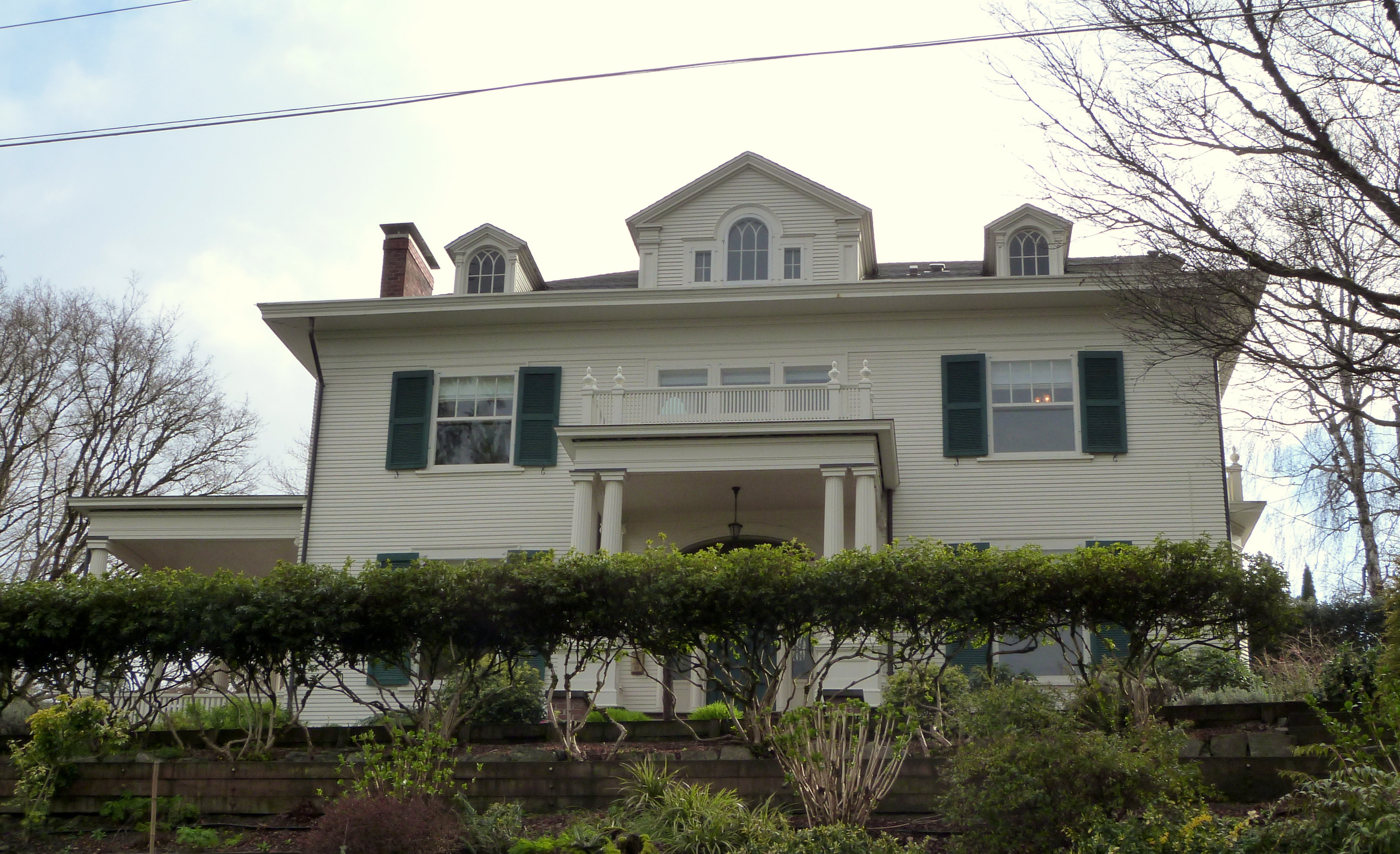
- The Spencer House in 2013.

- Location within Portland, Oregon
- Location: 1812 SW Myrtle Street; Portland, Oregon
- Coordinates: 45.510661°N 122.696678°W
- Area: 0.2 acres (0.081 ha)
- Built: 1909
- Architect: Ellis F. Lawrence
- Architectural style: Colonial Revival
- MPS: Architecture of Ellis F. Lawrence MPS
- NRHP reference No.: 99000942
- Added to NRHP: August 05, 1999

The Arthur Champlin Spencer and Margaret Fenton Spencer House is a house located in southwest Portland, Oregon listed on the National Register of Historic Places.

== See also ==
- National Register of Historic Places listings in Southwest Portland, Oregon
