= Belle Court Apartments =

Historic building in Portland, Oregon, U.S.

- U.S. National Register of Historic Places
- U.S. Historic district – Contributing property
- Portland Historic Landmark
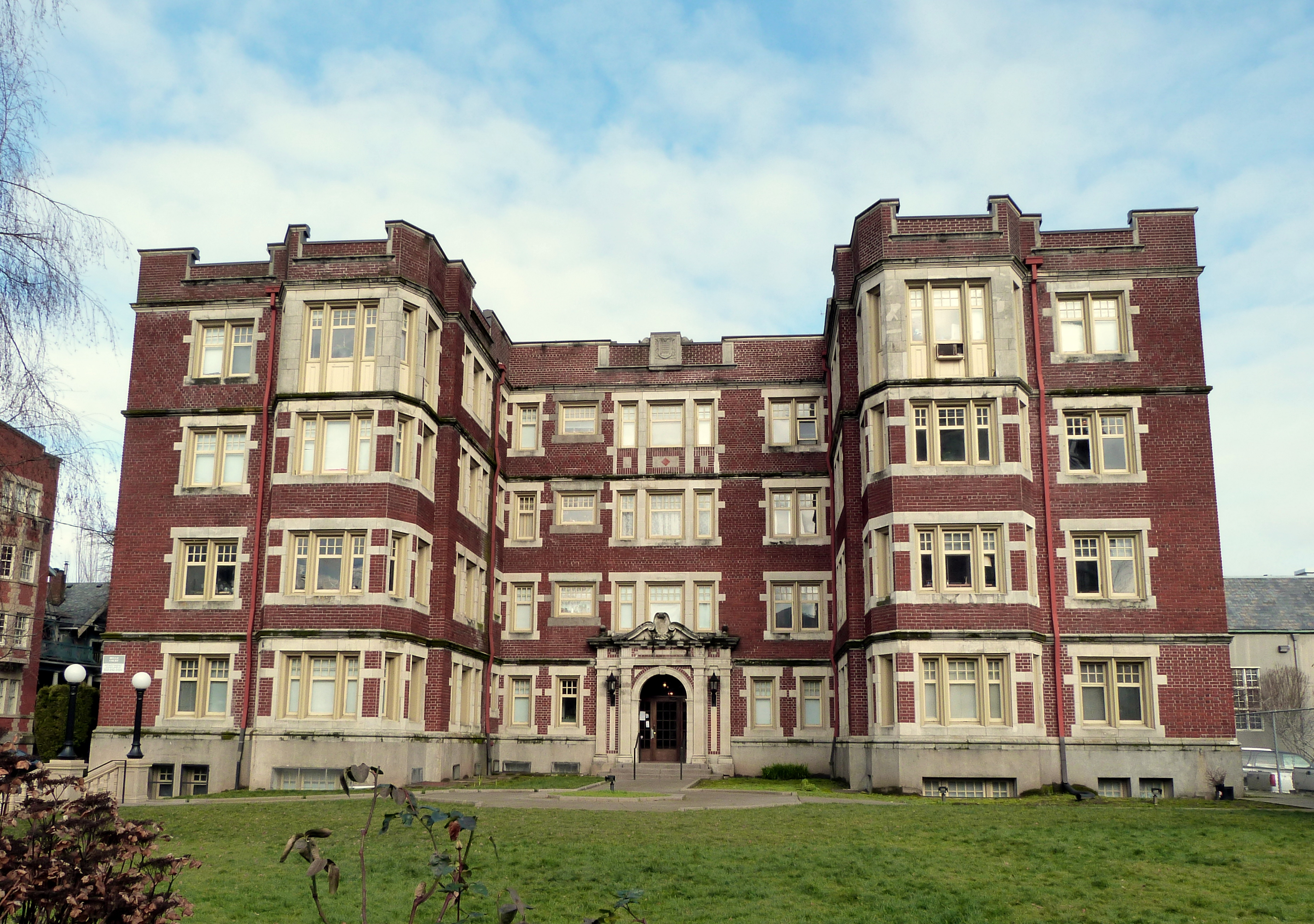
- Building's exterior, 2013

- Location within Portland, Oregon Location within Oregon Location within the United States
- Location: 120 NW Trinity Place; Portland, Oregon
- Coordinates: 45°31′26″N 122°41′28″W
- Built: 1912
- Architect: Ellis F. Lawrence
- Architectural style: Tudor Revival, Jacobethan
- Part of: Alphabet Historic District (ID00001293)
- NRHP reference No.: 86002966
- Added to NRHP: November 6, 1986

The Belle Court Apartments is a four-story building in northwest Portland, Oregon listed on the National Register of Historic Places. The building is in the Tudor Revival architecture style designed by Ellis Fuller Lawrence in 1912.

== See also ==
- National Register of Historic Places listings in Northwest Portland, Oregon
