= William H. Lewis Model House =

Historic building in Portland, Oregon, U.S.

- U.S. National Register of Historic Places
- Portland Historic Landmark
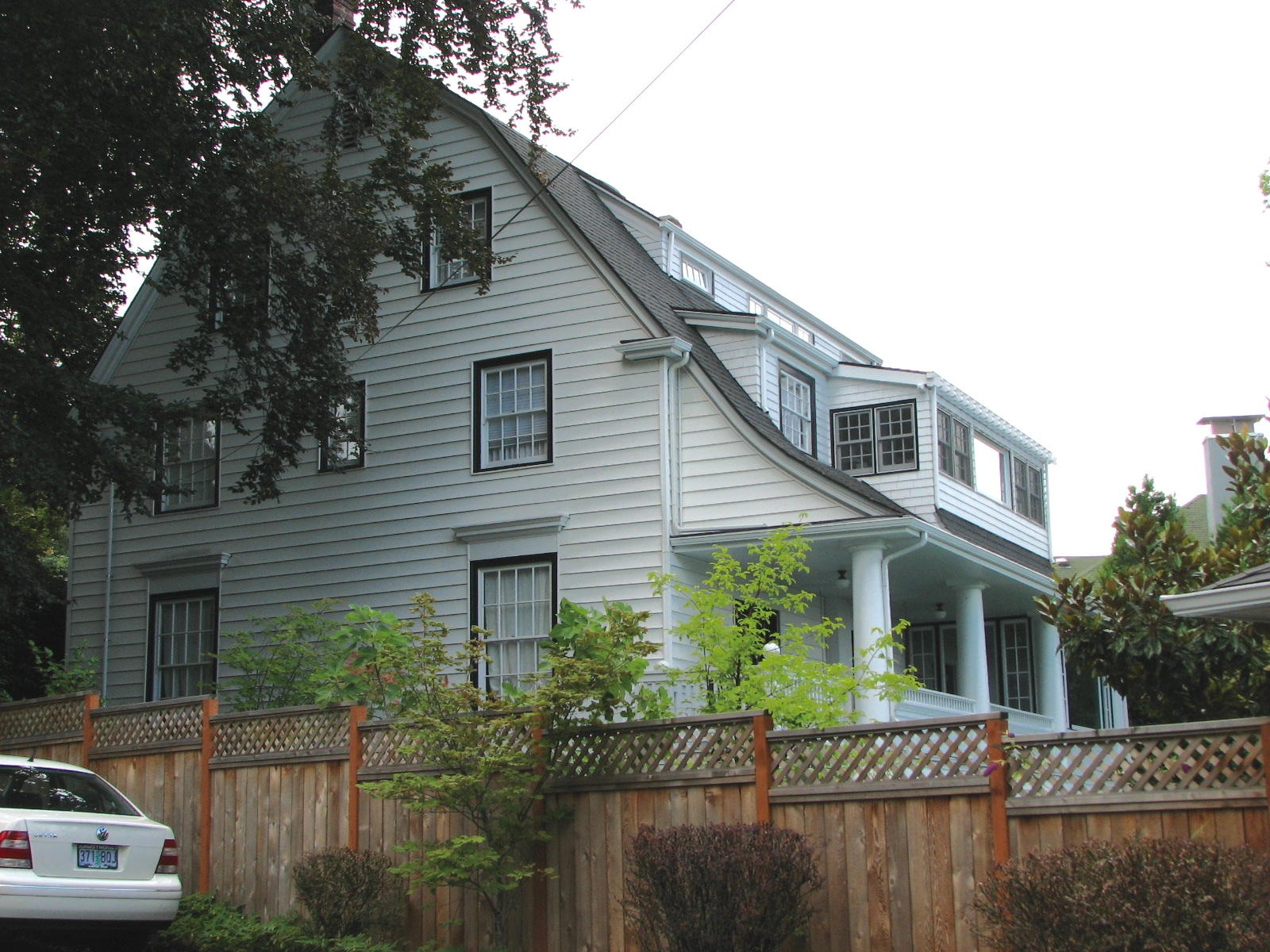
- The Lewis Model House in 2008
- Location: 2877 NW Westover Road; Portland, Oregon
- Coordinates: 45°31′57″N 122°42′36″W
- Area: 0.34 acres (0.14 ha)
- Built: 1911
- Built by: William H. Lewis
- Architect: Ellis F. Lawrence
- Architectural style: Dutch Colonial Revival
- NRHP reference No.: 90000274
- Added to NRHP: March 6, 1990

The William H. Lewis Model House is a historic residence in Portland, Oregon, United States.

The house was listed on the National Register of Historic Places in 1990.

== See also ==
- National Register of Historic Places listings in Northwest Portland, Oregon
