= Henry B. Dickson House =

Historic building in Portland, Oregon, U.S.

- U.S. National Register of Historic Places
- Portland Historic Landmark
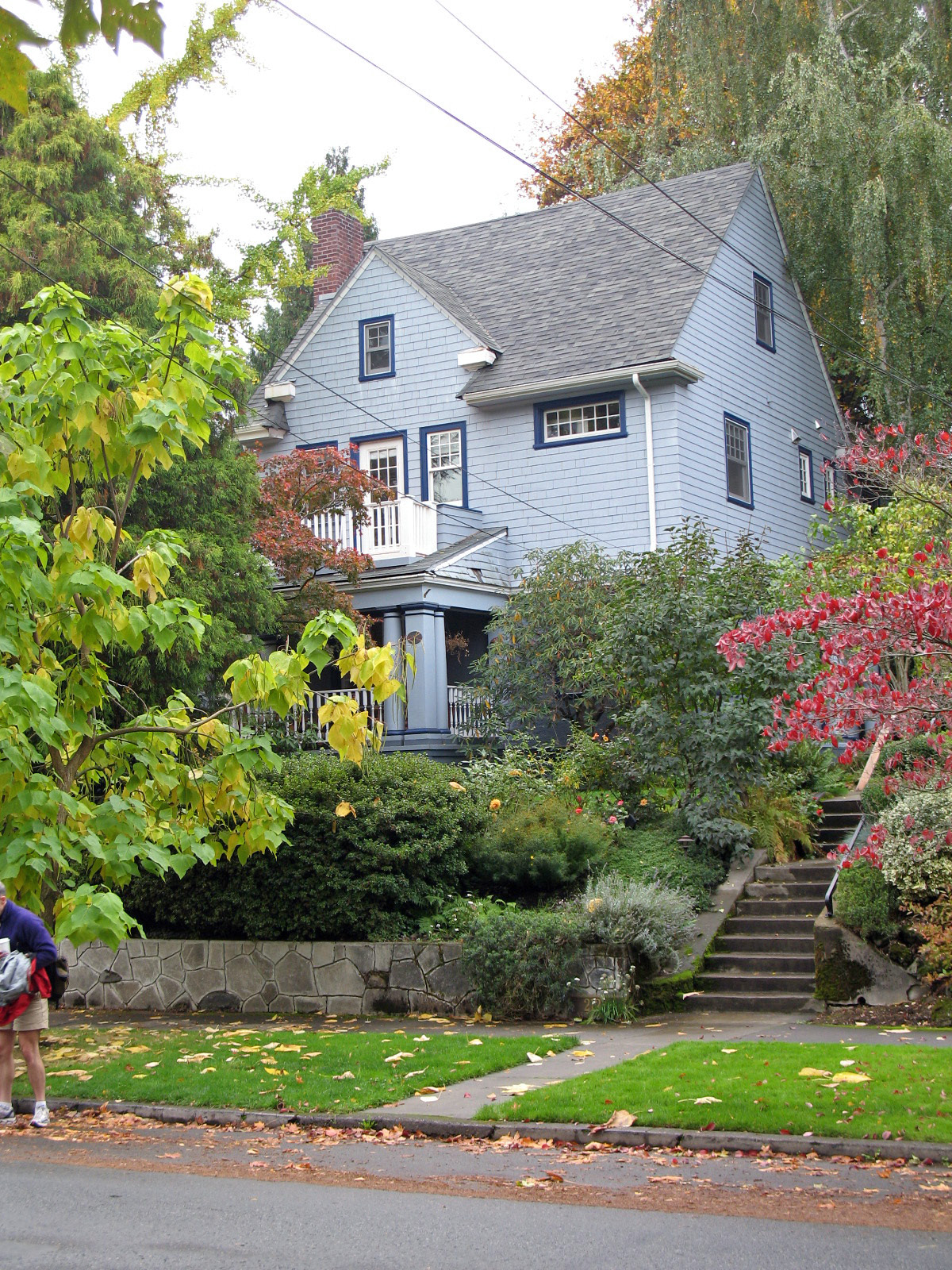
- Henry B. Dickson House in 2009

- Location within Portland, Oregon
- Location: 2123 NE 21st Avenue; Portland, Oregon
- Coordinates: 45°32′16″N 122°38′41″W
- Area: 0.1 acres (0.040 ha)
- Built: 1909
- Architect: Ellis Fuller Lawrence
- Architectural style: Bungalow/Craftsman, Colonial Revival
- MPS: Architecture of Ellis F. Lawrence MPS
- NRHP reference No.: 97000849
- Added to NRHP: August 1, 1997

The Henry B. Dickson House is a house located in northeast Portland, Oregon, listed on the National Register of Historic Places.

== See also ==
- National Register of Historic Places listings in Northeast Portland, Oregon
