= Hall–Chaney House =

Historic house in Oregon, United States

- U.S. National Register of Historic Places
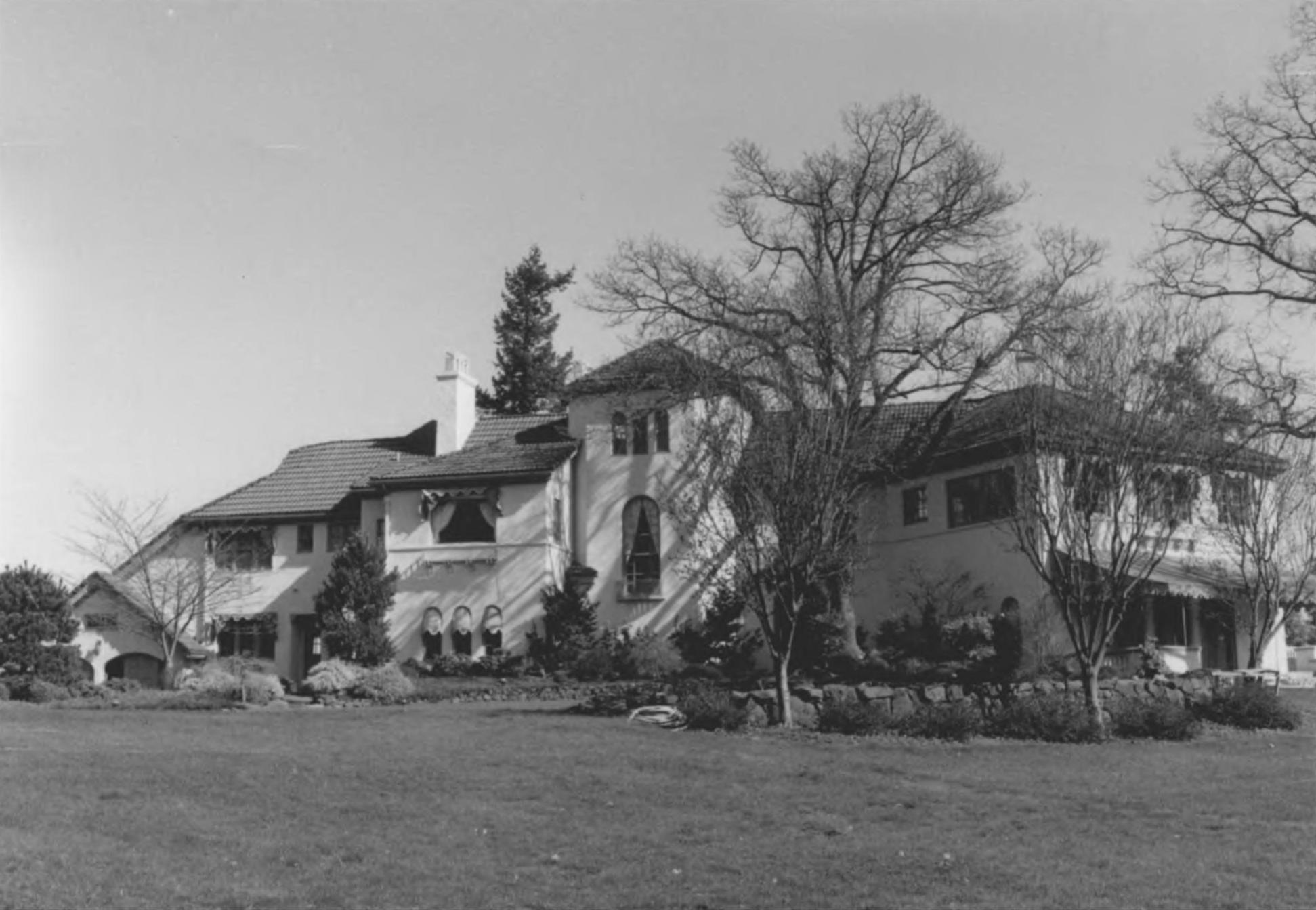
- The Hall–Chaney House in 1988.

- Location within Portland, Oregon
- Location: 10200 SE Cambridge Lane; Milwaukie, Oregon
- Coordinates: 45°26′56″N 122°38′44″W
- Area: 2 acres (0.81 ha)
- Built: 1916
- Architect: Ellis F. Lawrence, Lawrence & Holford
- Architectural style: Late 19th and 20th Century Revivals, Mediterranean
- NRHP reference No.: 88001522
- Added to NRHP: September 8, 1988

The Hall–Chaney House in Milwaukie, Oregon was built in 1916 and was listed on the National Register of Historic Places in 1988.

It was designed by architects Lawrence and Holford in Mediterranean style architecture. Its NRHP nomination explains that architect-designed fine detailing in the interior includes arched windows and door openings, a central stairwell with "a beautifully carved rail and turned balusters", "ornately carved mantelpieces, built-in book cases, niches, and wood panelling."

An architecturally compatible swimming pool addition was added in 1923.
