= Frank C. Stettler House =

Historic building in Portland, Oregon, U.S.

- U.S. National Register of Historic Places
- Portland Historic Landmark
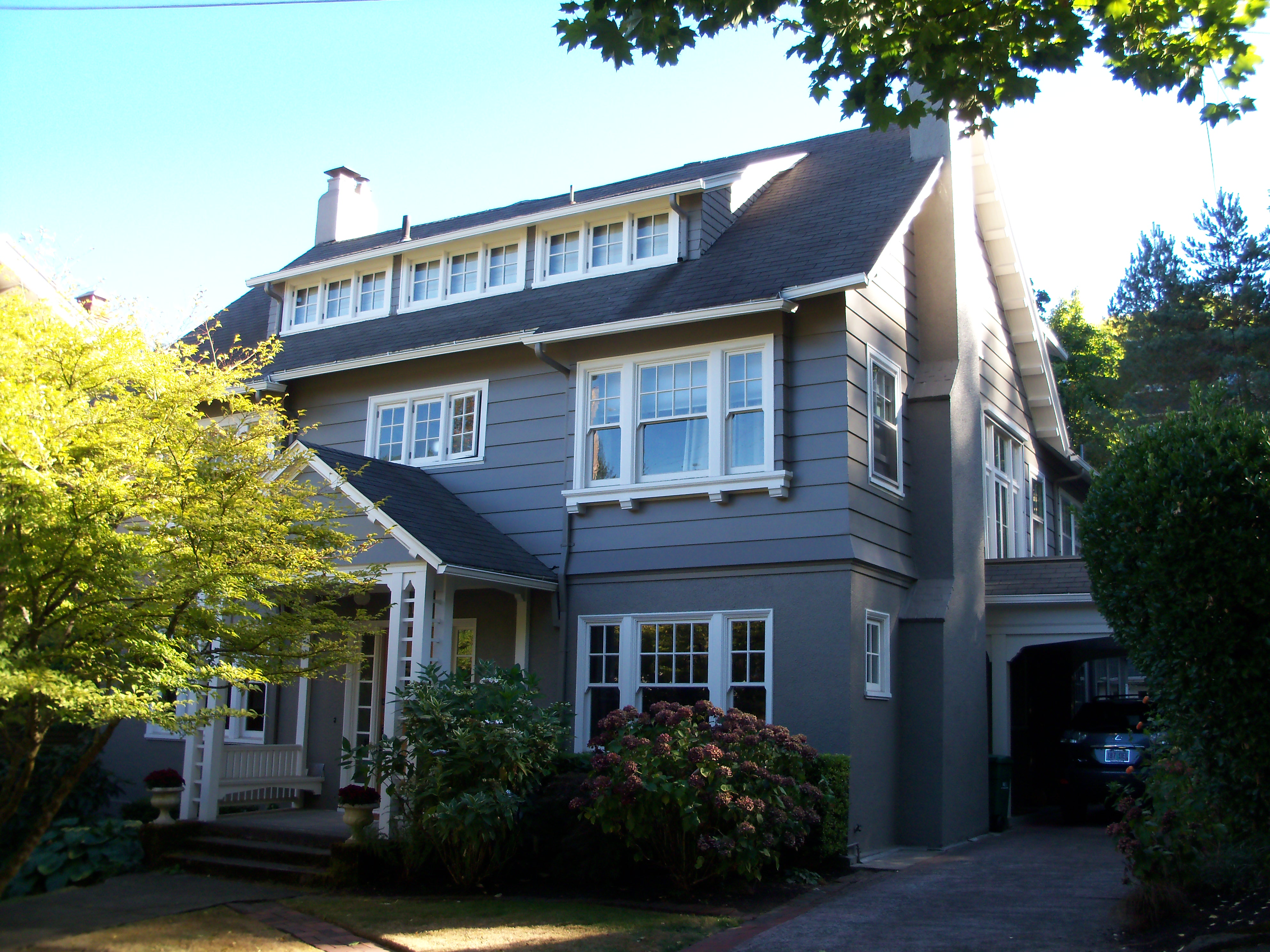

- Location within Portland, Oregon Location within Oregon Location within the United States
- Location: 2606 NW Lovejoy Street; Portland, Oregon
- Coordinates: 45°31′45.9″N 122°42′16.5″W
- Area: 0.2 acres (0.081 ha)
- Built: 1916
- Architect: Lawrence & Holford
- Architectural style: Bungalow/Craftsman, Arts and Crafts
- NRHP reference No.: 90000287
- Added to NRHP: February 23, 1990

The Frank C. Stettler House is a house located in northwest Portland, Oregon listed on the National Register of Historic Places.

== See also ==
- National Register of Historic Places listings in Northwest Portland, Oregon
