= Wells–Guthrie House =

Historic building in Portland, Oregon, U.S.

- U.S. National Register of Historic Places
- Portland Historic Landmark
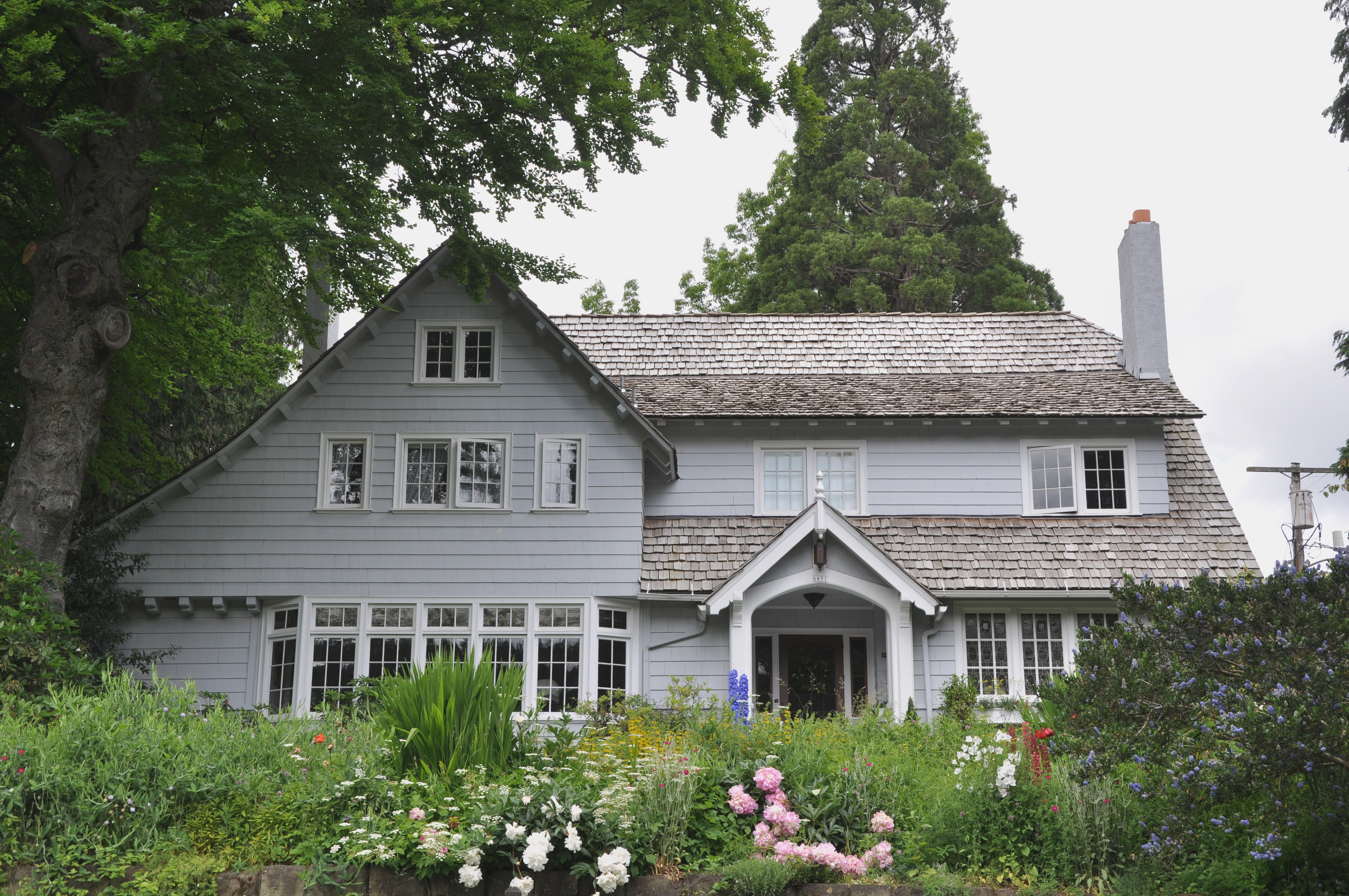
- The Wells–Guthrie House in 2011
- Location: 6651 SE Scott Drive; Portland, Oregon
- Coordinates: 45°31′06″N 122°35′42″W
- Area: 0.6 acres (0.24 ha)
- Built: 1912
- Architect: Ellis F. Lawrence
- Architectural style: Arts and Crafts
- NRHP reference No.: 90000278
- Added to NRHP: February 23, 1990

The Wells–Guthrie House in Portland, Oregon was built in 1912. It was listed on the National Register of Historic Places in 1990.
