= Paul C. Murphy House =

Historic building in Portland, Oregon, U.S.

- U.S. National Register of Historic Places
- U.S. Historic district – Contributing property
- Portland Historic Landmark
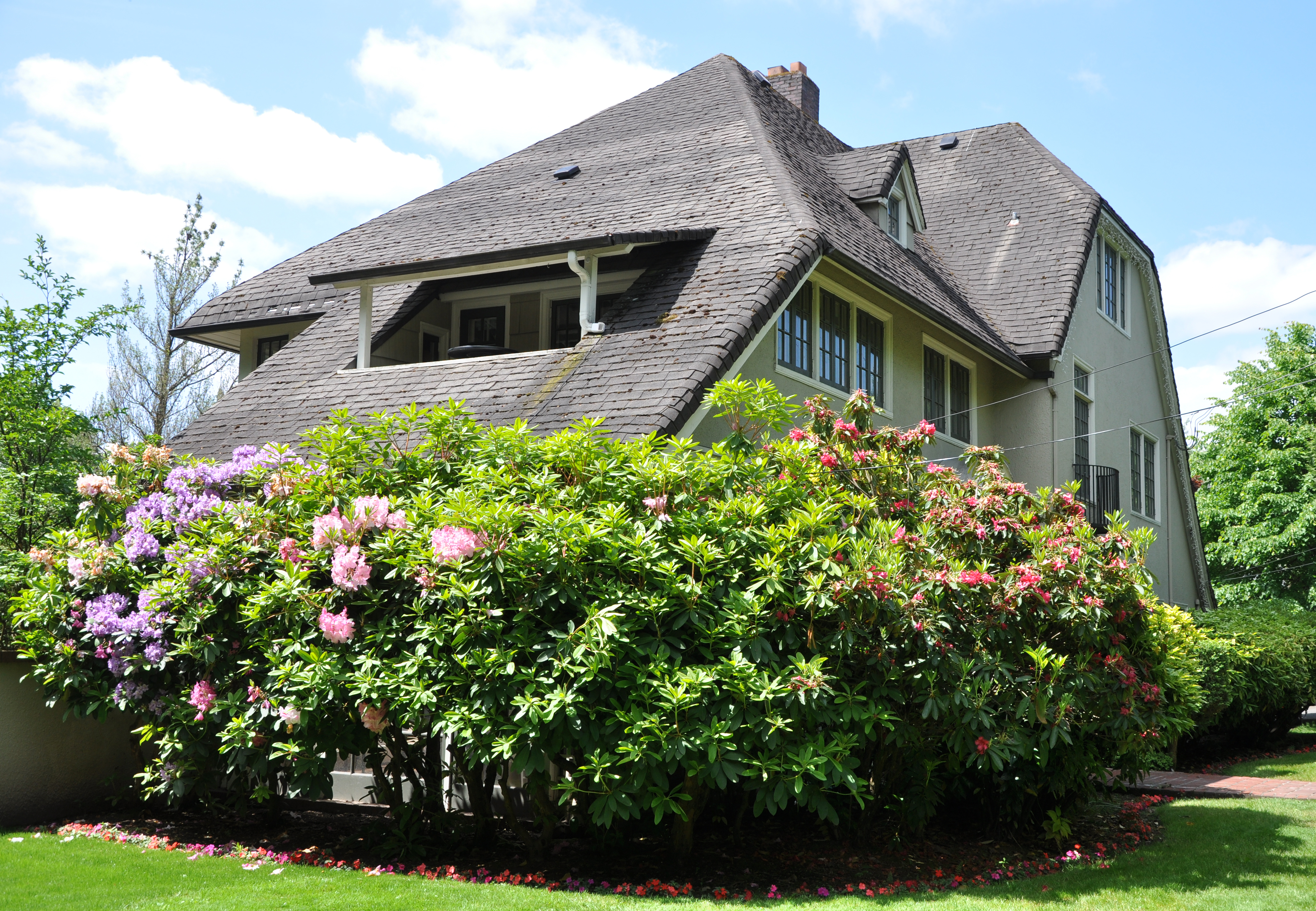
- Paul C. Murphy House in 2011

- Location within Oregon Location within the United States
- Location: 3574 E. Burnside Street; Portland, Oregon
- Coordinates: 45°31′22″N 122°37′33″W
- Area: 50 by 26 feet (15.2 by 7.9 m)
- Built: 1916
- Architect: Lawrence & Holford
- Architectural style: English Cottage (Arts and Crafts)
- Part of: Laurelhurst Historic District (ID100003462)
- NRHP reference No.: 91000145
- Added to NRHP: February 28, 1991

The Paul C. Murphy House is a 2.5-story residence in southeast Portland, in the U.S. state of Oregon. Built in 1916 in the English Cottage style, it was added to the National Register of Historic Places in 1991.

Designed by Ellis F. Lawrence, the house has a floor plan of about 50 by 26 feet (15.2 by 7.9 m). Its interior has formal living spaces on the ground floor, bedrooms on the second floor, a full attic, and a basement with a family room and tiled fireplace. Rooms on the main floor include a central hall, living room, dining room, den, kitchen, pantry, half-bath, and sun porch. On the second floor are three bedrooms, a sleeping porch, and two bathrooms. The house has a separate servants' entrance at the rear and a servants' staircase leading to a bedroom, sewing room, and bathroom in the attic. The exterior features a hipped roof, multiple gables, small gabled dormers, and a glass-enclosed porch.

The home originally belonged to Paul Cole Murphy, a real-estate developer and president of the Ladd Estate Company, which was organized in 1908 to manage the properties of the locally prominent Ladd family. In 1909, Murphy and others bought a large property, Hazelfern Farm, from the Ladds and formed the Laurelhurst Company to develop Laurelhurst, a park-like residential neighborhood that includes the Murphy House. Murphy lived in this house until 1945, when he retired and moved to Santa Barbara.

== See also ==
- National Register of Historic Places listings in Southeast Portland, Oregon
