= Natt and Christena McDougall House =

Historic building in Portland, Oregon, U.S.

- U.S. National Register of Historic Places
- Portland Historic Landmark
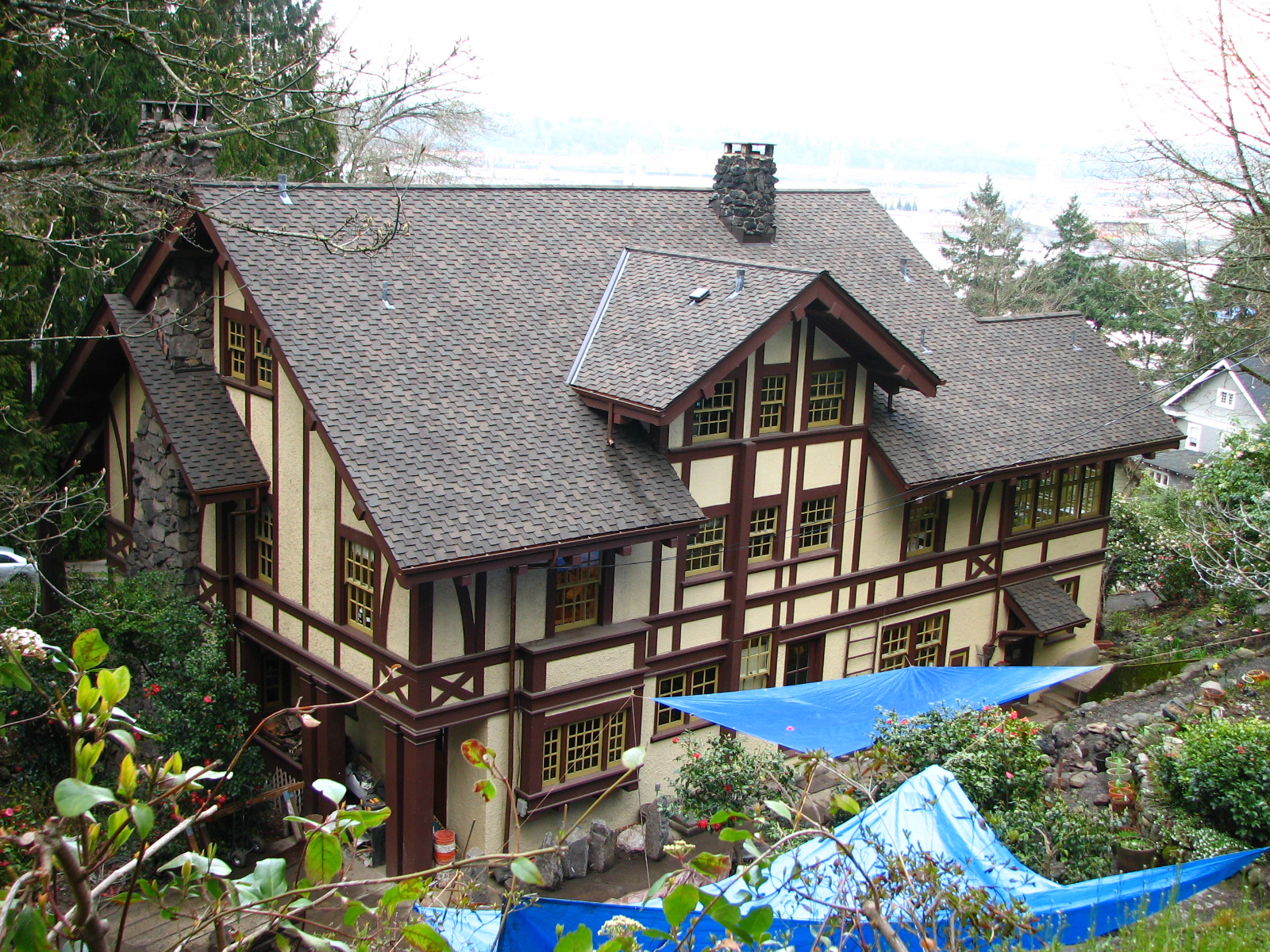

- Location within Oregon Location within the United States
- Location: 3728 NW Thurman Street; Portland, Oregon
- Coordinates: 45°32′21″N 122°43′16″W
- Area: 0.5 acres (0.20 ha)
- Built: 1911
- Built by: Franchell & Parlin
- Architect: Ellis Lawrence
- Architectural style: Arts & Crafts, Tudor Revival
- MPS: Architecture of Ellis F. Lawrence MPS
- NRHP reference No.: 99000358
- Added to NRHP: March 18, 1999

The Natt and Christena McDougall House is a house located in northwest Portland, Oregon, that is listed on the National Register of Historic Places.

It was designed by architect Ellis Lawrence in Arts & Crafts and Tudor Revival style, and is one of his early works.

The listing includes the garage as another contributing building and a stone wall as a contributing object. The wall is a random rubble basalt wall along the sidewalk, which rises from 2 feet (0.61 m) to 15 feet (4.6 m) above the sidewalk. In 1998 there was an ivy-covered wood and wire fence along the top of the wall.

== See also ==
- Alexander D. McDougall House, nearby at 3814 NW Thurman Street, another NRHP-listed example of Ellis Lawrence's work
- National Register of Historic Places listings in Northwest Portland, Oregon
