= Alexander D. McDougall House =

Historic building in Portland, Oregon, U.S.

- U.S. National Register of Historic Places
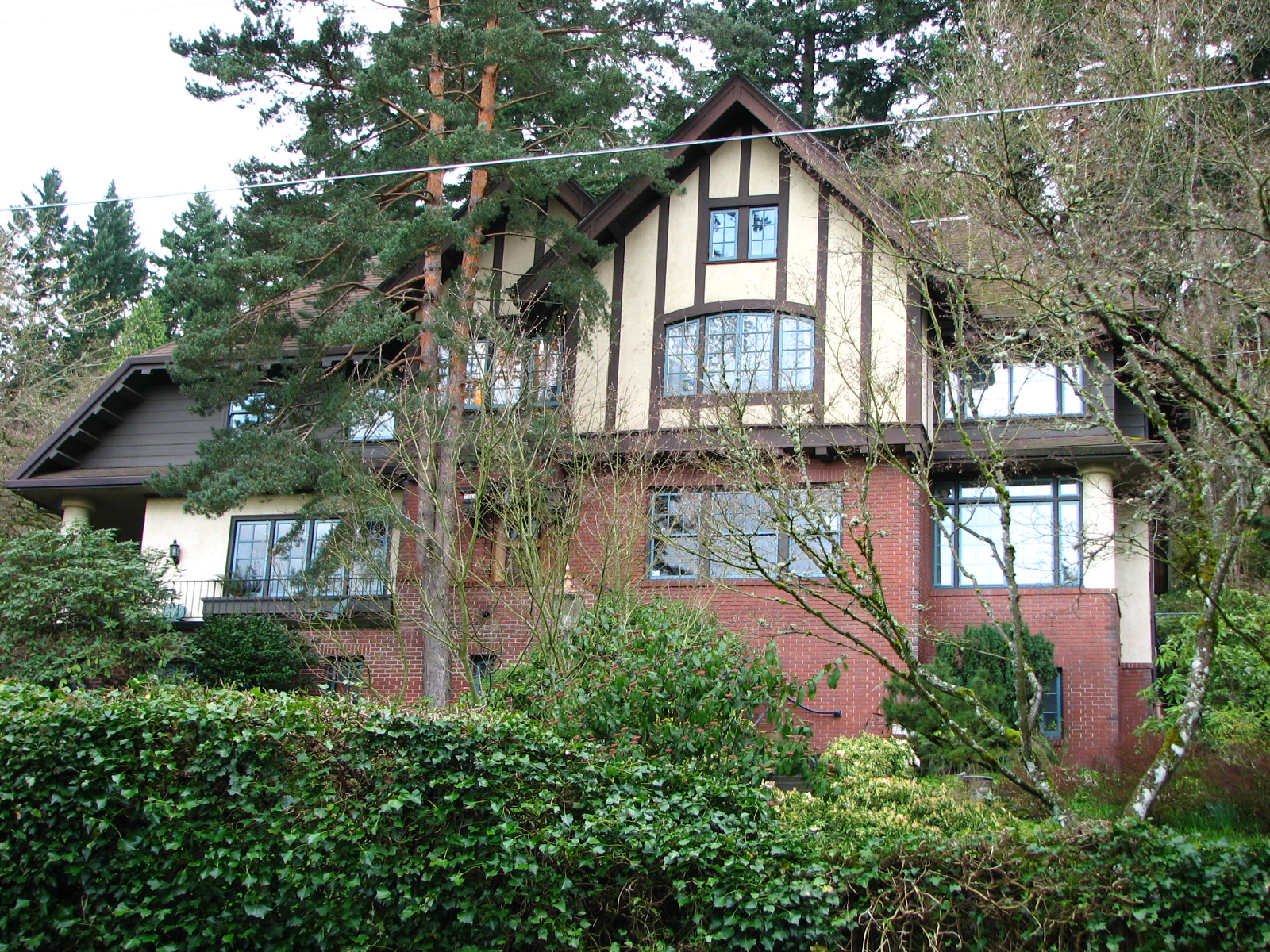
- The house's exterior in 2008

- Location within Oregon
- Location: Northwest Thurman St., Portland, Oregon
- Coordinates: 45°32′24″N 122°43′11″W
- Area: 0.4 acres (0.16 ha)
- Built: 1911
- Built by: Franchell & Parlin
- Architect: Ellis Lawrence
- Architectural style: English Tudor; Arts and Crafts
- MPS: Architecture of Ellis F. Lawrence MPS
- NRHP reference No.: 99000359
- Added to NRHP: March 18, 1999

The Alexander D. McDougall House is a historic house in the Willamette Heights neighborhood of Northwest Portland, in Portland, Oregon.

It was designed by architect Ellis Lawrence with elements of Tudor Revival architecture and Arts & Crafts architecture, and it was built in 1911 by local builders Franchell & Parlin.

The house is significant as an "excellent intact example" of the early work of Lawrence. Its notable features include the views afforded from its siting; on the outside its landscaping, rock walls, decorative half-timbering, brickwork, and verandah; and on the inside its floor plan which provides "comfort and efficiency" despite the large size of the house, its oak paneling, niches, built-in benches, and art glass window.

== See also ==
- National Register of Historic Places listings in Northwest Portland, Oregon
- Natt and Christena McDougall House, nearby at 3728 NW Thurman Street, another NRHP-listed example of Ellis Lawrence's work
