= Isaac Neuberger House =

Historic building in Portland, Oregon, U.S.

- U.S. National Register of Historic Places
- Portland Historic Landmark
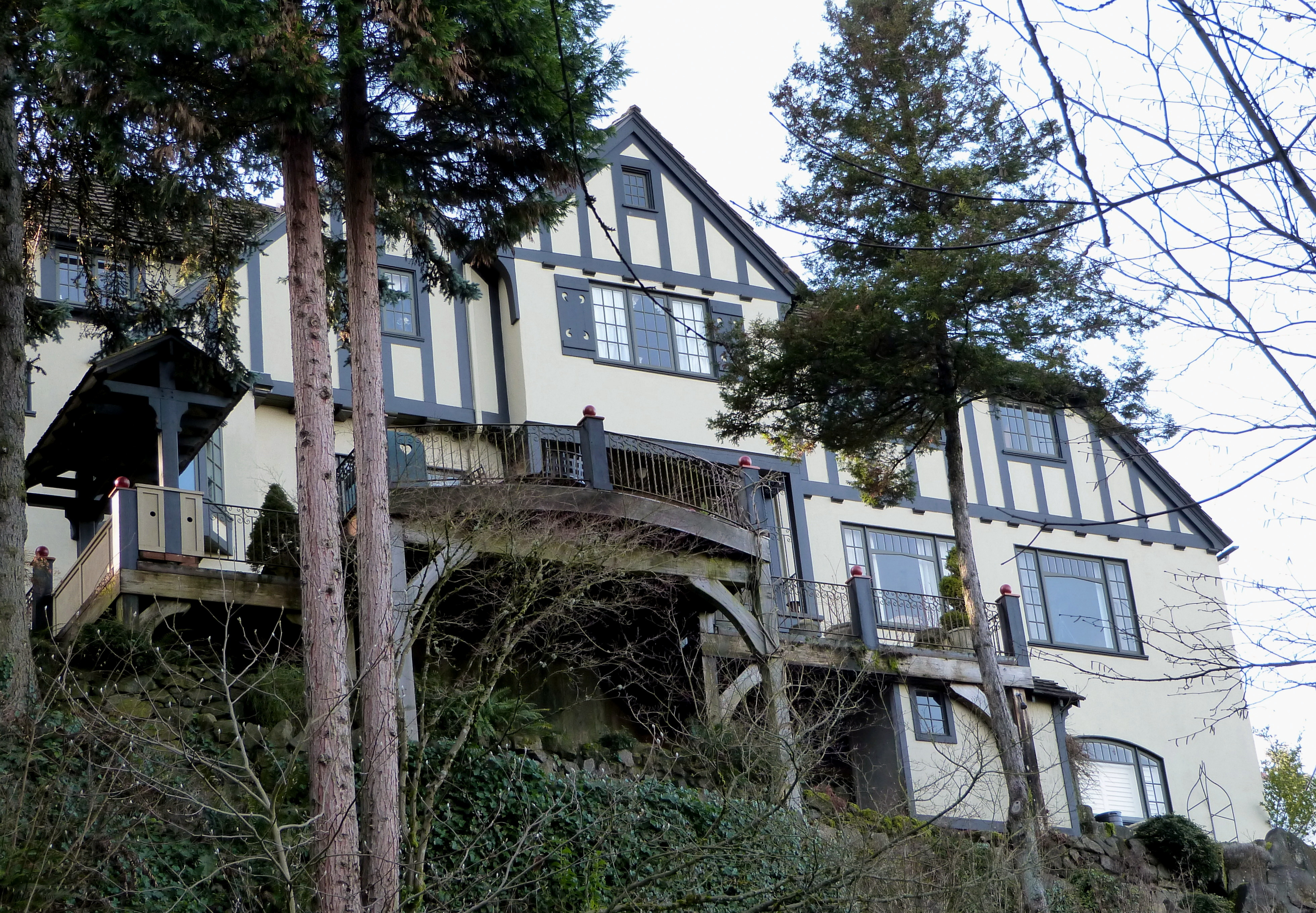
- The Neuberger House as seen from the rear, in 2013

- Location within Portland, Oregon Location within Oregon Location within the United States
- Location: 630 NW Alpine Terrace; Portland, Oregon
- Coordinates: 45°31′38″N 122°42′38″W
- Area: less than one acre
- Built: 1937
- Architect: Lawrence, Holford & Allyn
- Architectural style: Tudor Revival
- MPS: Architecture of Ellis F. Lawrence MPS
- NRHP reference No.: 90001512
- Added to NRHP: October 17, 1990

The Isaac Neuberger House is a house located in northwest Portland, Oregon listed on the National Register of Historic Places.

== See also ==
- National Register of Historic Places listings in Northwest Portland, Oregon
