= James E. Wheeler House =

Historic building in Portland, Oregon, U.S.

- U.S. National Register of Historic Places
- Portland Historic Landmark
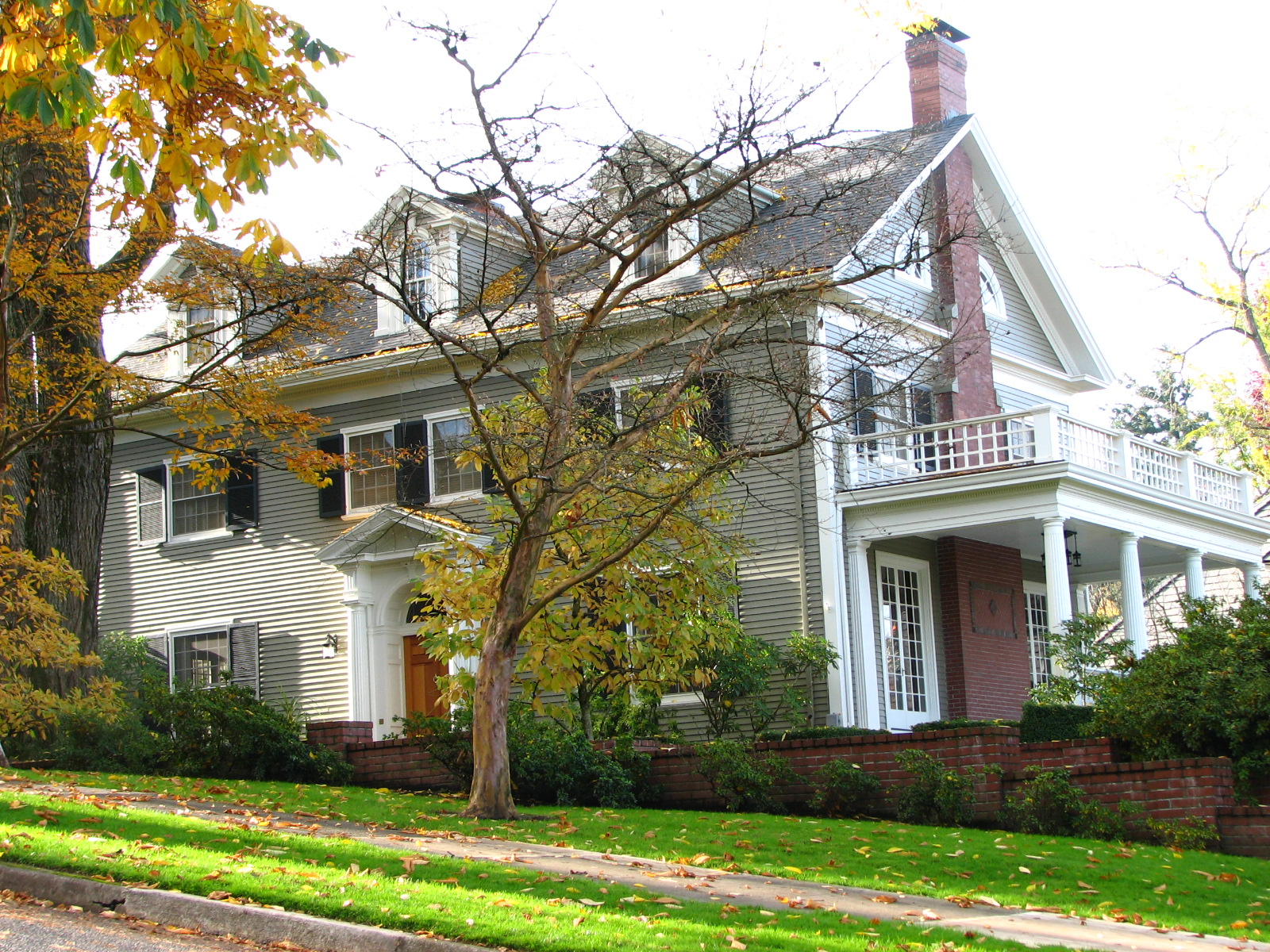
- The Wheeler House in 2008

- Location within Portland, Oregon
- Location: 2417 SW 16th Avenue; Portland, Oregon
- Coordinates: 45°30′31″N 122°41′44″W
- Built: 1910
- Architect: Ellis F. Lawrence
- Architectural style: Colonial Revival
- MPS: Architecture of Ellis F. Lawrence MPS
- NRHP reference No.: 90001518
- Added to NRHP: October 17, 1990

The James E. Wheeler House is a house located in southwest Portland, Oregon listed on the National Register of Historic Places.

== See also ==
- National Register of Historic Places listings in Southwest Portland, Oregon
