= Oregon Pottery Company =

Pottery company

- Type: Private
- Industry: Pottery manufacturing
- Predecessor: Buena Vista Pottery Works; Smith and Company Pottery
- Founded: 1866; 160 years ago in Buena Vista, Oregon
- Founder: Freeman Smith; Amedee Smith; Freeman Smith, Jr.
- Defunct: 1911
- Successor: Western Clay Manufacturing Company

Oregon Pottery Company was established in the United States at Buena Vista, Oregon, in 1866. The largest pottery business on the West Coast of the United States at the time, it produced stoneware jars, jugs, and sewer pipes between 1866 and 1897 in Buena Vista and Portland, Oregon.

== History ==
With Oregon's statehood in 1859, substantial numbers of pioneers began settling in the Willamette Valley at the end of the Oregon Trail. These settlers needed "clay vessels for storing, preserving, and preparing foods—jugs for liquids, jars for pickling, pans for milk, butter churns and stoneware of all sizes."

Pioneer Freeman Smith first traveled to the Willamette Valley in 1851. He and his sons, Amedee and Freeman, Jr., moved from Iowa to the Buena Vista area near Albany, and they established "Smith and Company Pottery" by 1866. Their factory was located in Buena Vista on the east bank of the Willamette River, where suitable clay land had been found. They designed and built their own machines and kilns, and by 1871 employed between 25 and 50 men to dig clay, cut and haul wood, as well as load and unload kilns. For approximately the first five years, the factory produced heavy, salt glaze pottery with slip glaze interiors, stamped only with the vessels' capacities.

At first, Smith struggled to establish sales. Howard McKinley Corning wrote in Willamette Landings,

He (Smith) hauled his first load of earthenware to Albany where he found the merchants skeptical of being able to dispose of it. After repeated attempts to deal, Smith in discouragement was about to haul his unsold load back to Buena Vista when a merchant, John Conner, motioned him to take the entire lot of stoneware to the store's back door. Impulsively, Conner had decided to buy the entire lot and take a chance on selling or trading it away. Eventually Conner paid him at the rate of fifty cents per gallon capacity.

The business prospered, having the advantage of being able to sell wares produced locally, without the cost of importing wares from the east.

According to Blaine Schmeer, great-grandson of Amedee Smith, the company's name was changed sometime around 1870 to "Buena Vista Pottery Works". In 1870, Amedee Smith purchased his father's and brother's interests in the company. About that time, the company began producing lighter slip glaze stoneware.

As the sole proprietor, Amadee Smith made other significant changes, including his own new designs for machinery, and the use of templates in the throwing process. Templates reduced sculptural variations of individual potters and introduced mass-production techniques, which brought uniformity to the appearance of the stoneware. The company employed four turners at pottery wheels, and ten Chinese laborers who mixed the clay. By 1872, the company had expanded to produce sewer pipes.

In the mid-1870s, the title "Oregon Pottery Company" began to be used, but it was only re-organized and incorporated under that title in 1884.By then, glass containers had replaced stoneware in most Oregon homes.

Smith had moved some operations of the company to Portland in 1883. The company built a three-story factory with six kilns, and there manufactured "all kinds of vitrified pipes", while still producing pottery products (such as flower pots, fire brick, and chimney flues) in Buena Vista until that factory closed in 1886. Clay for the Portland operation was sourced from the Lewis and Clark River banks a few hundred yards from Fort Clatsop.

After a fire destroyed the Portland facility in 1890, Amedee Smith rebuilt an even larger brick factory on the existing property and an adjoining tract. When he died in 1897, his son A. M. Smith, Jr., reorganized the company under the name, "Western Clay Manufacturing Company". According to the Albany Democrat-Herald, "As pottery containers were replaced by glass and tin, the firm reorganized and manufactured brick and sewer pipe until 1911, when it was sold for $1 million."

The Buena Vista factory site was excavated in 1982 and 1983, producing shards that are in the Ceramics Analysis Laboratory of Portland State University. Records from Oregon Pottery Company are in the holdings of Oregon Historical Society.

== See also ==
- Ceramic glaze
- Vitrification
