= Alpha Phi Sorority House (Eugene, Oregon) =

Historic house in Oregon, United States

- U.S. National Register of Historic Places
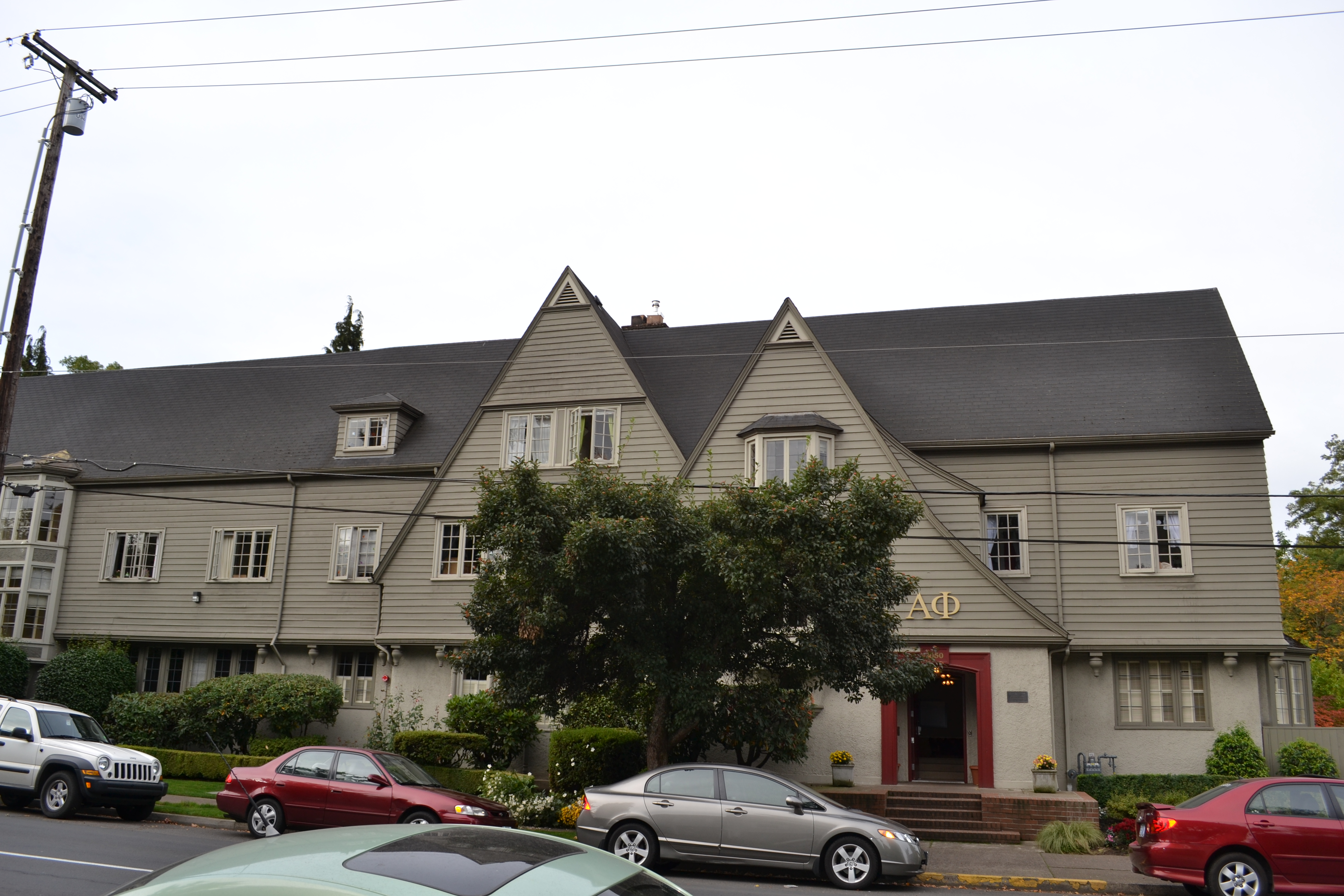

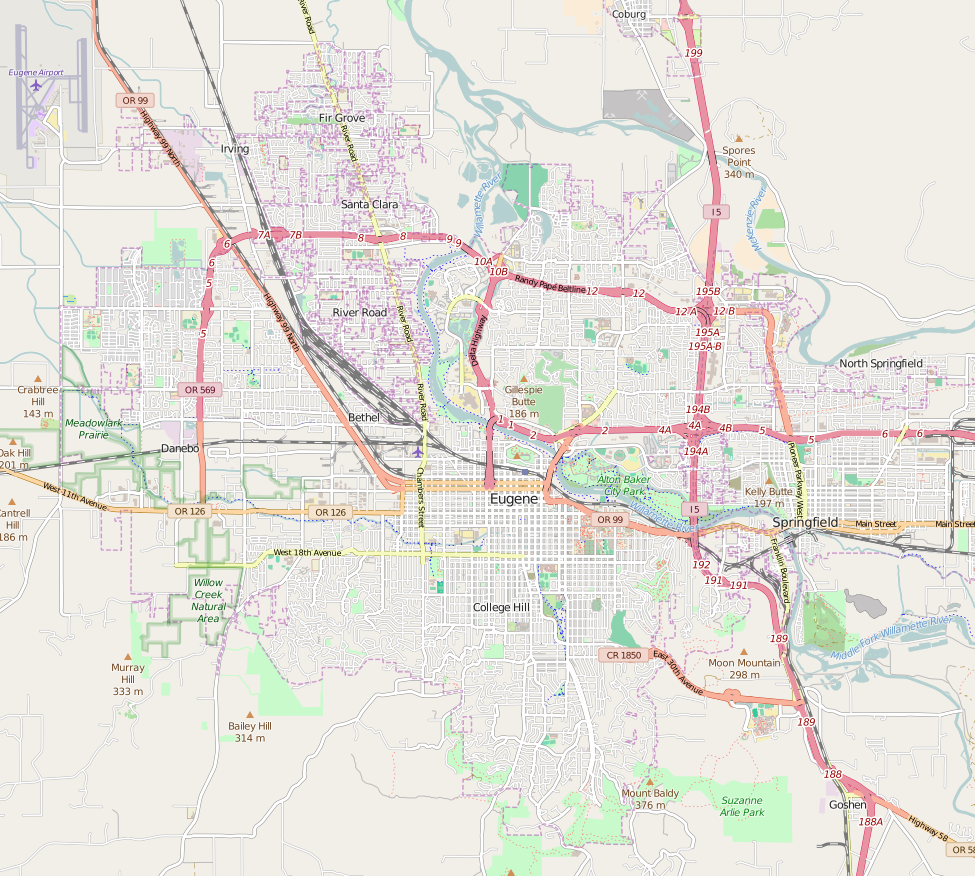
- Location within Eugene OR Location within Oregon
- Location: 1050 Hilyard St., Eugene, Oregon
- Coordinates: 44°02′53″N 123°04′52″W
- Built: 1924
- NRHP reference No.: 91001564
- Added to NRHP: October 17, 1991

The Alpha Phi Sorority House, located in Eugene, Oregon, is listed on the National Register of Historic Places. It is near the University of Oregon, home to the Tau chapter of Alpha Phi.

== See also ==
- National Register of Historic Places listings in Lane County, Oregon
