= Fred E. Taylor House =

Historic building in Portland, Oregon, U.S.

- U.S. National Register of Historic Places
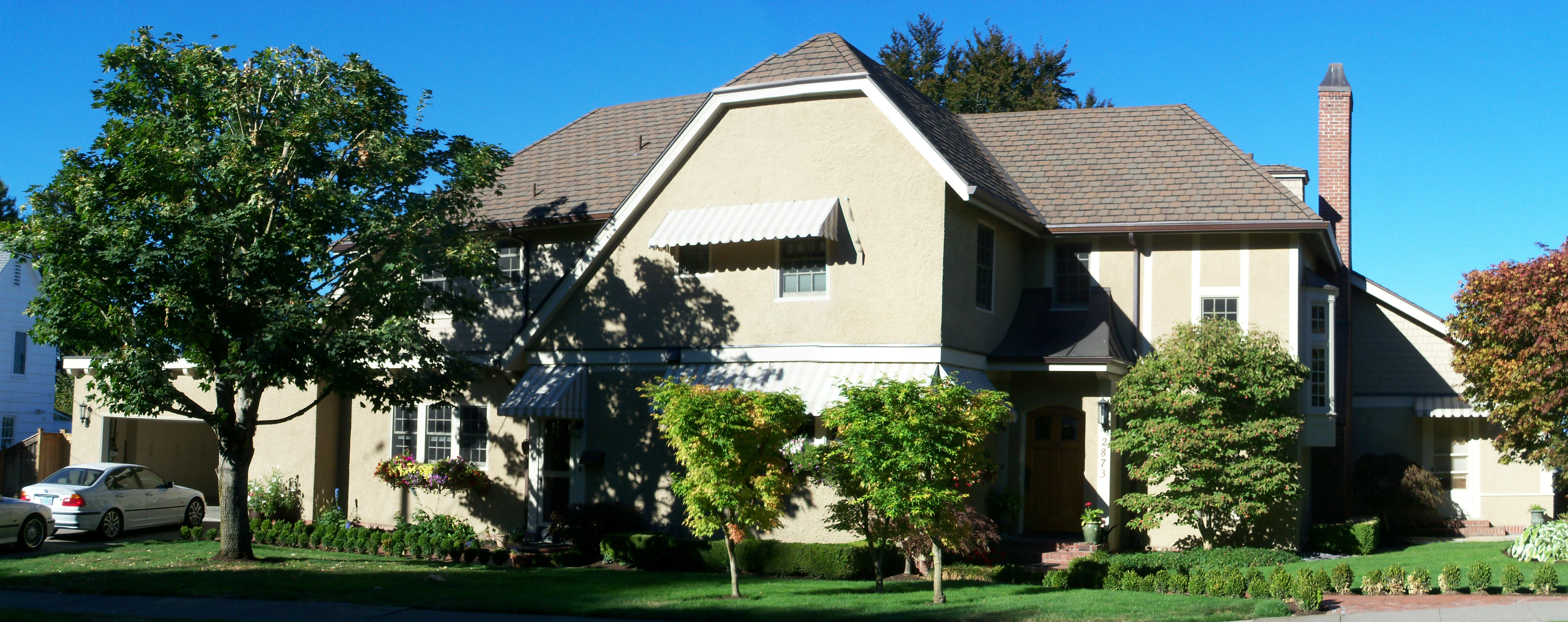

- Location within Oregon Location within the United States
- Location: 2873 NW Shenandoah Ter., Portland, Oregon
- Coordinates: 45°31′51″N 122°42′30″W
- Area: less than one acre
- Built: 1919
- Architect: Lawrence & Holford
- Architectural style: Arts & Crafts;English cottag
- MPS: Architecture of Ellis F. Lawrence MPS
- NRHP reference No.: 90001519
- Added to NRHP: October 17, 1990

The Fred E. Taylor House is a house located in northwest Portland, Oregon listed on the National Register of Historic Places.

== See also ==
- National Register of Historic Places listings in Northwest Portland, Oregon
