= Maurice Seitz House =

Historic building in Portland, Oregon, U.S.

- U.S. National Register of Historic Places
- Portland Historic Landmark
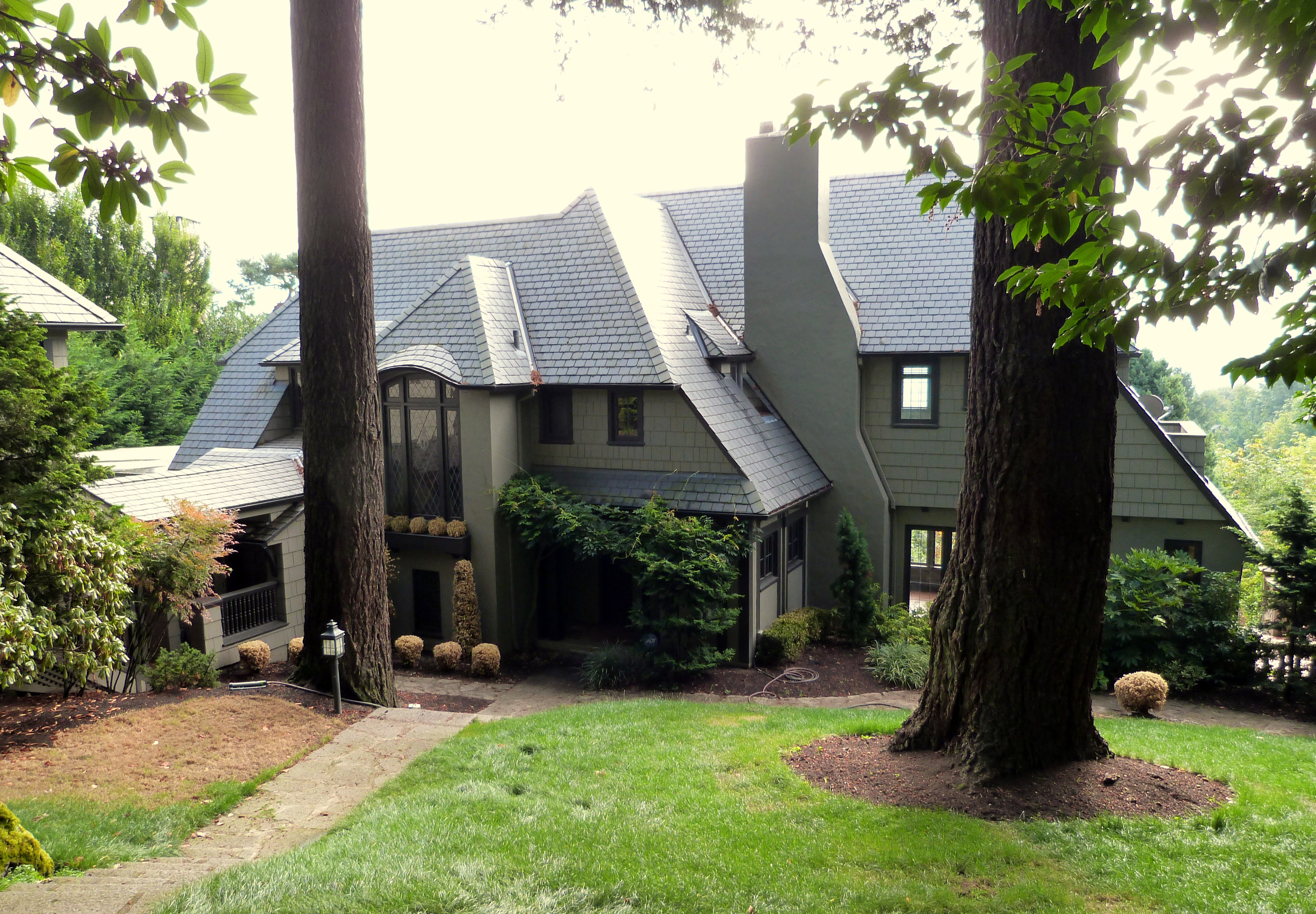
- The Seitz House in 2013.

- Location within Portland, Oregon
- Location: 1495 SW Clifton Street; Portland, Oregon
- Coordinates: 45°30′39″N 122°41′33″W
- Area: .39 acres
- Built: 1925
- Architect: Lawrence & Holford
- Architectural style: Tudor Revival
- MPS: Architecture of Ellis F. Lawrence MPS
- NRHP reference No.: 90001515
- Added to NRHP: October 17, 1990

The Maurice Seitz House is a house located in southwest Portland, Oregon listed on the National Register of Historic Places.

== See also ==
- National Register of Historic Places listings in Southwest Portland, Oregon
