= Emil Schacht =

Architect in Portland, Oregon (1854–1926)

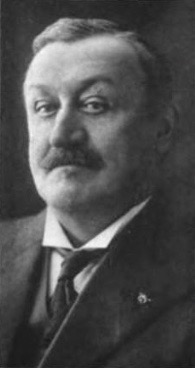
- Schacht circa 1900–1910
- Born: November 20, 1854; Duchy of Schleswig, Denmark
- Died: March 4, 1926 (aged 71); Portland, Oregon
- Occupation: Architect

Emil Schacht (November 20, 1854 – March 4, 1926) was an architect in Portland, Oregon. Schacht's work was prolific from the 1890s until World War I and he produced commercial buildings including factories and warehouses as well as residential projects, hotels and theatres. He is known for his craftsman architecture style homes and was a founding member of the 1902 Portland Association of architects.

== In Portland ==
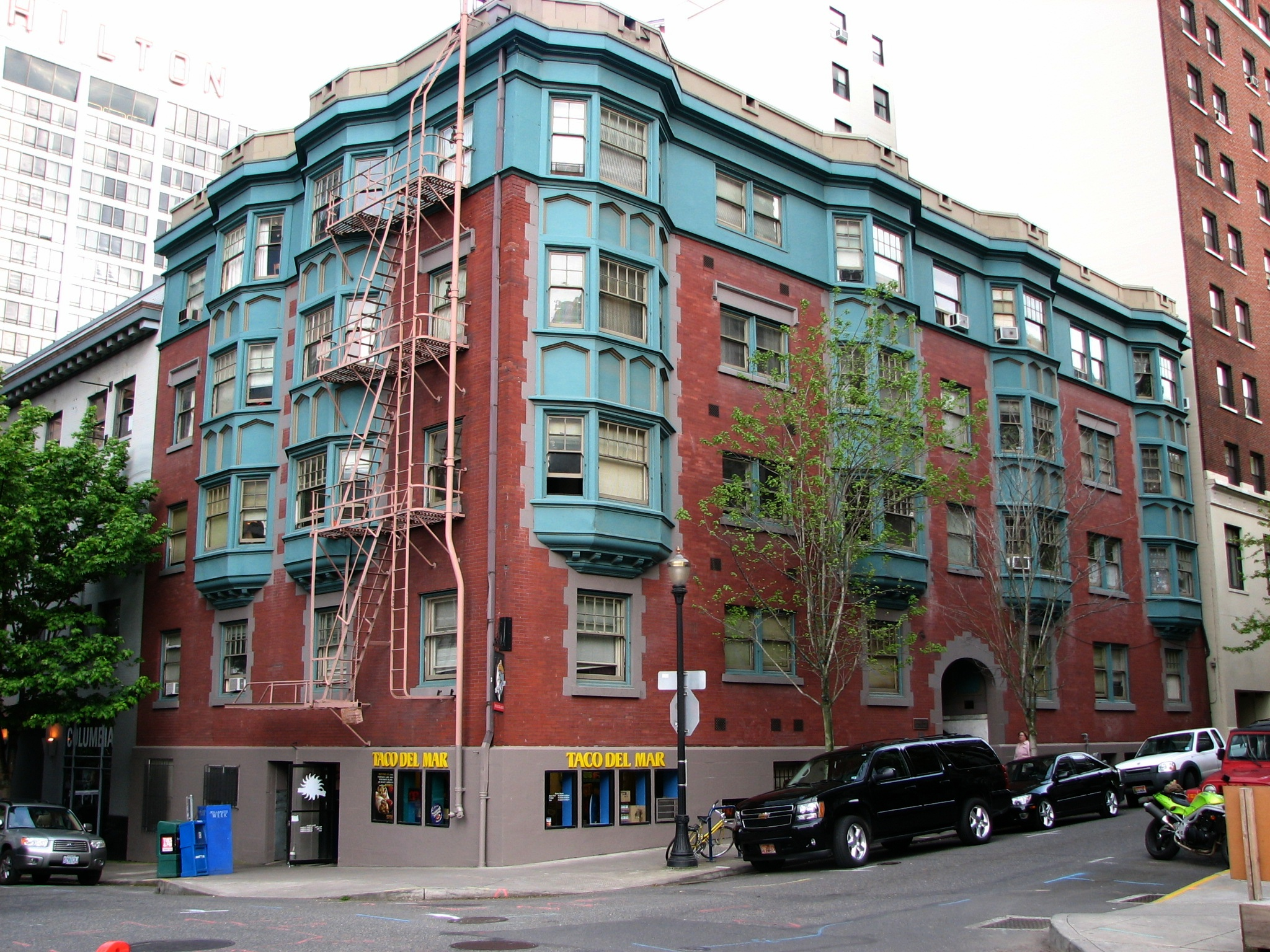
Wheeldon Apartment Building/ Admiral Apartments

Schacht's firms included Emil Schacht & Son, and designed the Wheeldon Apartments in Portland: a 5-story brick Tudor Revival apartment building in Downtown Portland. The building became known as the Admiral Apartments in the 1970s and has also been known as the Admiral Hotel Apartments. It was built in 1909 and listed on the National Register of Historic Places in 1990. The building's apartments had between two and five multiple bedrooms and included hardwood floors and electric dumbwaiter service. By 1913 the services of at least three "sporting girls" (prostitutes) were offered in the building. The building was renovated and in 1990 it was listed on the National Register of Historic Places.

== In Astoria ==
Schacht's firm designed what is now the Clatsop County Heritage Museum, at 1618 Exchange Street, a neo-classical building constructed in 1904 as Astoria's City Hall. It was used for that purpose until 1939 and "used as a Public Library, a USO Club during WWII, and the first home of the Columbia River Maritime Museum", before eventually becoming the Heritage Museum, in the mid-1980s. It was listed on the National Register of Historic Places on September 7, 1984.

Schacht also designed the original building that was "rebuilt" into Uppertown Fire Station No. 2. Constructed in 1896 at 2968 Marine Drive it was part of the North Pacific Brewery. It was shut down in 1915 due to prohibition, and "in 1928, the City of Astoria rebuilt it as the fire station, and it continued to be used in that role until 1960. It was put on the National Register of Historic Places on September 7, 1984 and in 1989 "it was donated to the Clatsop County Historical Society to become the Uppertown Firefighters Museum... the second floor also houses the Astoria Children's Museum."

== Legacy ==
Some of Schacht's plans and drawings are held in the Cachot Therkelsen Collection with the University of Oregon Libraries.

== Projects ==
- Pacific Metal Company Building design (1909), when the company's the owners decided to concentrate in the Pacific Northwest under the direction of Harry F. Morrow, son of William and new building was erected at Park and Everett Streets in Portland.
- Blyth Building
- Hotel Gearhart (Seaside, Oregon)
- Hotel Oregon
- Pantages Theater (Portland, Oregon) (1912)
- Nob Hill Apartments
- Police station building (Police Bureau Building on Oak Street)
- "The Louvre", an "entertainment complex" in Astoria built for August Erickson in 1895.

== Projects listed on the National Register of Historic Places ==
- Astoria City Hall (old) at 1618 Exchange Street in Astoria, Oregon
- Astoria Fire House No. 2 at 2968 Marine Drive in Astoria
- Cohn-Sichel House at 2205 NW. Johnson Street in Portland
- Henry Hahn House at 2636 NW. Cornell Road in Portland
- Peter Jeppesen House at 4107 N. Albina Avenue in Portland
- Ida and Moses Kline House at 2233 SW 18th Avenue in Portland
- Nicolai–Cake–Olson House at 1903 NE Hancock Street in Portland
- Portland Police Block at 209 SW Oak Street in Portland
- Swetland Building at 500 SW 5th Avenue in Portland

=== Emil Schacht & Son ===
- Wheeldon Apartment Building (1909) at 910 SW. Park Avenue in Portland
- Christine Becker House at 1331 NW. 25th Avenue in Portland
