= Nicolai–Cake–Olson House =

Historic building in Portland, Oregon, U.S.

- U.S. National Register of Historic Places
- U.S. Historic district – Contributing property
- Portland Historic Landmark
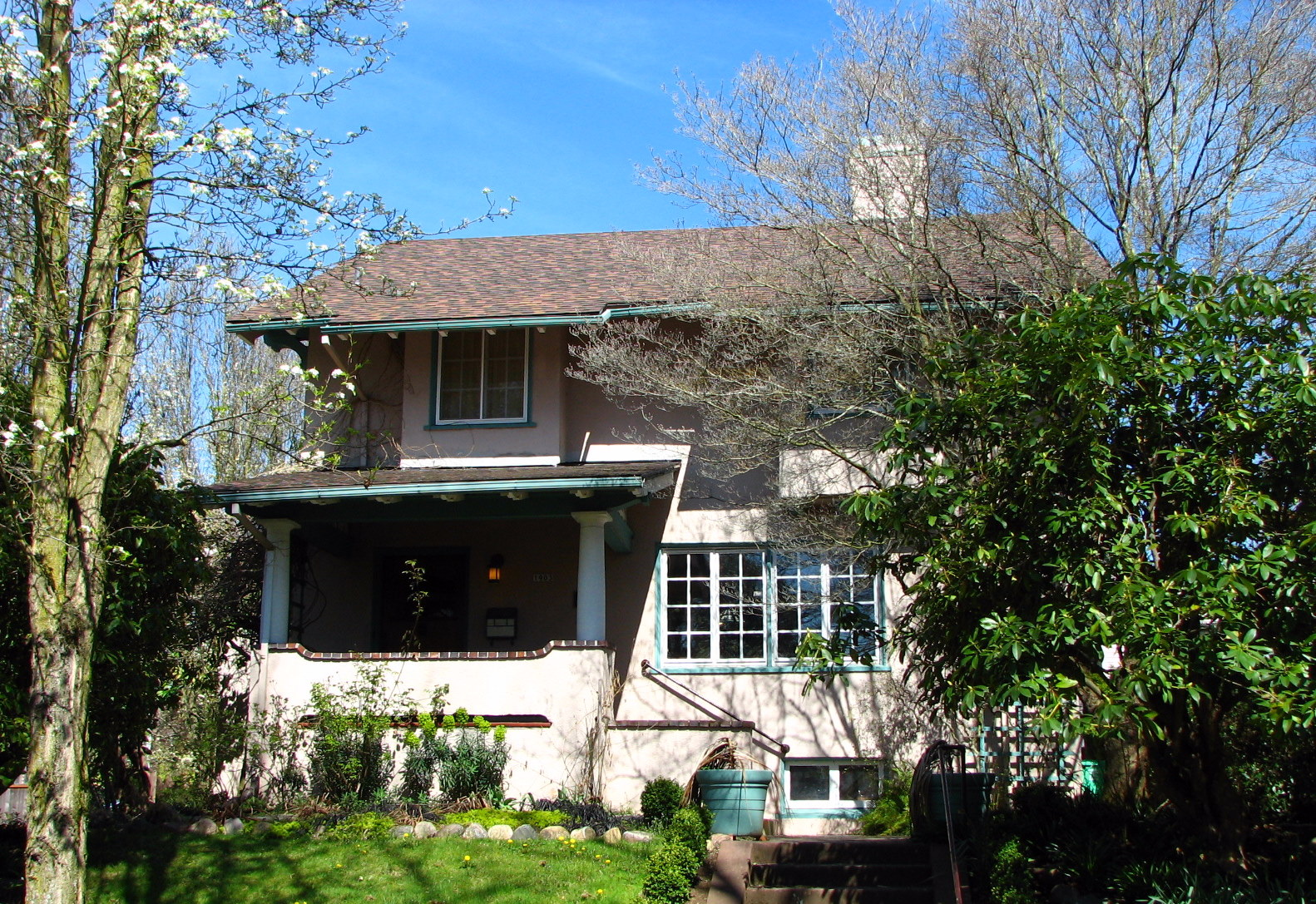

- Location within Oregon
- Location: 1903 NE Hancock Street; Portland, Oregon
- Coordinates: 45°32′12″N 122°38′47″W
- Area: less than one acre
- Built: 1905
- Architect: Schacht, Emil
- Architectural style: Bungalow/craftsman
- Part of: Irvington Historic District (ID10000850)
- NRHP reference No.: 01000828
- Added to NRHP: August 8, 2001

The Nicolai–Cake–Olson House is a residence located in northeast Portland, Oregon listed on the National Register of Historic Places.

Designed by Portland architect Emil Schacht in the Arts and Crafts style, it was built in 1905–6. The interior retains much of its historic integrity, as the Olsons, who owned it from 1925 to 1967, maintained it in its original condition after some early changes.

== See also ==
- National Register of Historic Places listings in Northeast Portland, Oregon
