= Cohn–Sichel House =

Historic building in Portland, Oregon, U.S.

- U.S. National Register of Historic Places
- U.S. Historic district – Contributing property
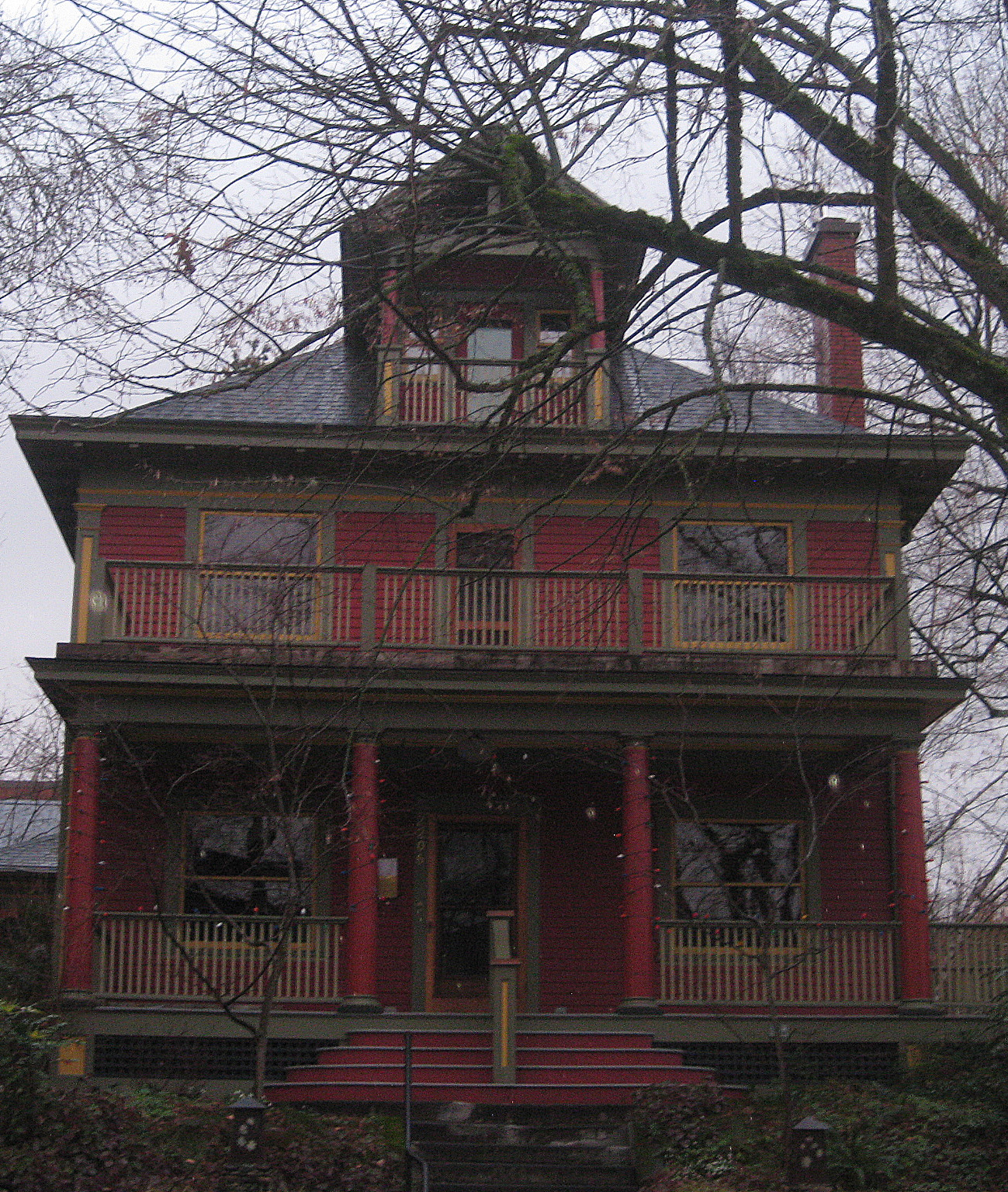

- Location within Portland, Oregon
- Location: 2205 NW Johnson Street; Portland, Oregon
- Coordinates: 45°31′43″N 122°41′48″W
- Built: 1907
- Architect: Emil Schacht
- Architectural style: Bungalow/Craftsman
- Part of: Alphabet Historic District (ID00001293)
- NRHP reference No.: 08000119
- Added to NRHP: February 28, 2008

The Cohn–Sichel House is a house located in northwest Portland, Oregon listed on the National Register of Historic Places.

== See also ==
- National Register of Historic Places listings in Northwest Portland, Oregon
