= Admiral Apartments =

Historic building in Portland, Oregon, U.S.

- Wheeldon Apartment Building
- U.S. National Register of Historic Places
- Portland Historic Landmark
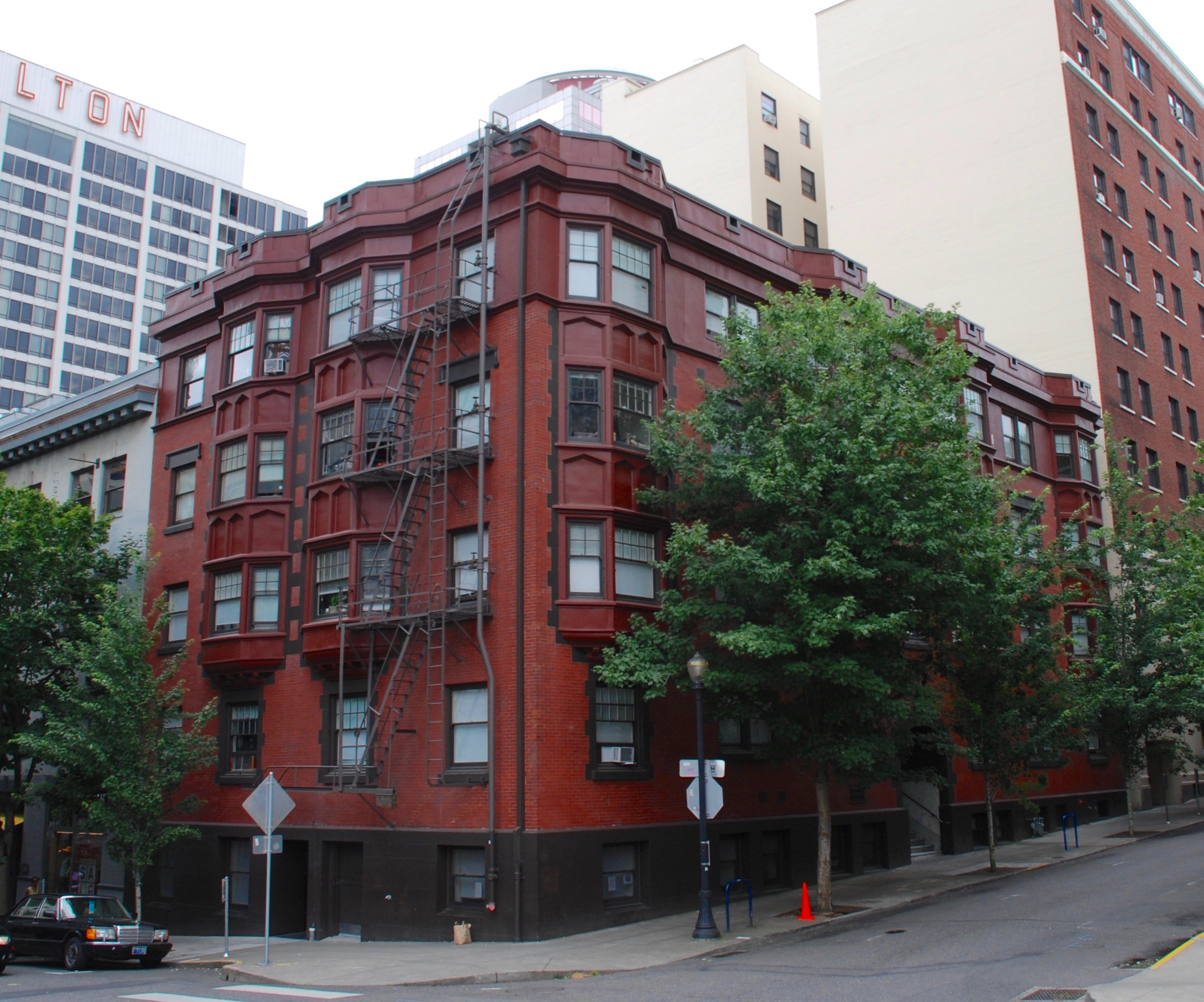
- The Wheeldon Apartment Building in 2014

- Location within Portland, Oregon Location within Oregon Location within the United States
- Location: 910 SW Park Avenue; Portland, Oregon
- Coordinates: 45°31′05″N 122°40′52″W
- Area: less than one acre
- Built: 1909
- Architect: Emil Schacht and Son
- Architectural style: Tudor Revival
- NRHP reference No.: 90001591
- Added to NRHP: October 25, 1990

The Admiral Apartments, originally the Wheeldon Apartments and also known as the Admiral Hotel Apartments, is a five-story brick Tudor Revival apartment building in downtown Portland, Oregon, United States, that was built in 1909. It has been on the National Register of Historic Places since 1990.

== History ==
The building was designed by Emil Schacht and Son and built in 1909. The building was originally named after its first manager, Alice Wheeldon, and was renamed the Admiral Apartments in 1929.

The apartments were upscale with two to five bedrooms, hardwood floors, and an electric dumbwaiter service. By 1913, the neighborhood was changing and the building was home to at least three "sporting girls" (prostitutes). In October 1929, a two-alarm fire on the first floor quickly spread up to the attic and roof. Half of the structure was completely undamaged, but the fire caused $10,000–$15,000 in damage. The damage did not spread to the neighboring Heathman Hotel.

In 1921, Alice W. Nelson started a trust with the Portland Trust & Savings Bank after her husband died, and one investment in the trust was a loan to the owners of the Admiral Apartments. During the Great Depression, income in Nelson's trust account declined due in part to the trustee's (the bank) difficulty in collecting the mortgage payments from the owner of the apartments, which were also sold at a loss by the owners. Nelson sued the bank, claiming they mismanaged her trust account, but she lost the trial and on appeal to the Oregon Supreme Court.

By the 1970s, the building was a flophouse. Renovations were made in 1980 when Mike Purcell rebuilt the apartments on a government contract and 37 apartments became subsidized housing. In 1990, the building was listed on the National Register of Historic Places, as the Wheeldon Apartment Building. Rent was protected until 2010, and the apartments occupied by low-income elderly and disabled residents.

Starting in 2009, the apartments were completely renovated by Walsh Construction using a SERA Architects design. The remodeling was paid for by the Portland Development Commission and Oregon Housing and Community Services Department. Portland's REACH Community Development Corporation was listed as the owner.
