= Peter Jeppesen House =

Historic house in Portland, Oregon, U.S.

- U.S. National Register of Historic Places
- Portland Historic Landmark
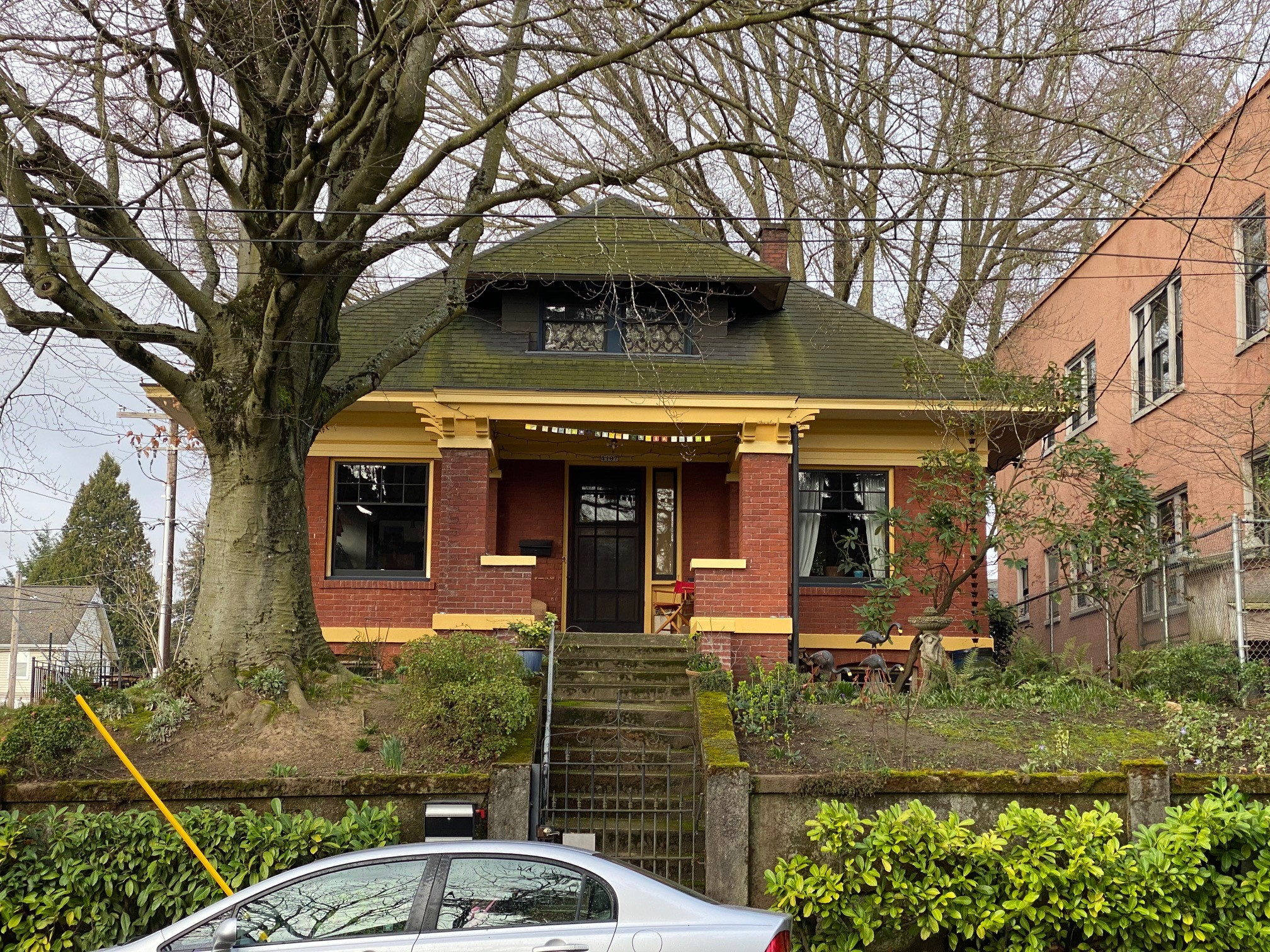
- Peter Jeppesen House in 2020

- Location within Portland, Oregon
- Location: 4107 N. Albina Ave., Portland, Oregon
- Coordinates: 45°33′13″N 122°40′29″W
- Area: less than one acre
- Built: 1909
- Architect: Emil Schacht
- Architectural style: Bungalow/Craftsman, Arts and Crafts
- NRHP reference No.: 87001535
- Added to NRHP: September 10, 1987

The Peter Jeppesen House is a house located in north Portland, Oregon listed on the National Register of Historic Places.

== Description and history ==
The Peter Jeppesen House at 4107 North Albina Avenue in Portland, Oregon is a 1 1/2-story, symmetrical, hip-roofed bungalow with dormers. Its distinctions are its general European character and solid double-walled brick construction. Designed by a noteworthy Danish-born Portland architect, the bungalow is faintly reminiscent of the avant-garde work of Adolph Loos and Austrian proponents of the Arts and Crafts movement. It meets National Register Criterion C as a well-documented example of a collaboration between architect and builder; a house produced by a craftsman in his own medium for his own use. Peter Jeppesen (1861-1956), brick mason, and Emil Schacht, architect, were Danish emigres. Jeppesen was the contractor not only for numerous buildings but for a number of sidewalk construction projects around the city which can be identified today by his imprimature. Schacht (1854-1926) is noted in Oregon architectural history as the designer of the Oriental Building for the Lewis and Clark Centennial exposition of 1905. He also designed the 1912 unit of the Police Block on Oak Street in Portland which has been entered into the National Register, the Lenox Hotel and the building occupied by the Povey Brothers' well-known art glass manufactory.

Jeppesen acquired the nominated property in payment for construction work elsewhere in North Portland. He acquired the adjoining lot at the same time and developed there an income-producing, four-unit apartment building, for which plans were provided once again by his fellow countryman. The house may be seen as a tangible reminder that Albina was a settlement area for Scandinavian immigrants in the years surrounding the turn of the century. Jeppesen was active through his long and productive career in Portland in the Danish Aid Society and the Danish Brotherhood. Like other newly arrived immigrants, Peter Jeppesen was attracted to Albina, a once-separate settlement ultimately annexed to Portland, for its large concentration of Scandinavians. Albina was important as an industrial area of Portland in the boom years following the Lewis and Clark Exposition of 1905. Before its annexation by Portland in 1891, the area known as Albina was one of many small river towns along the Willamette, such as St. John's and Linnton.

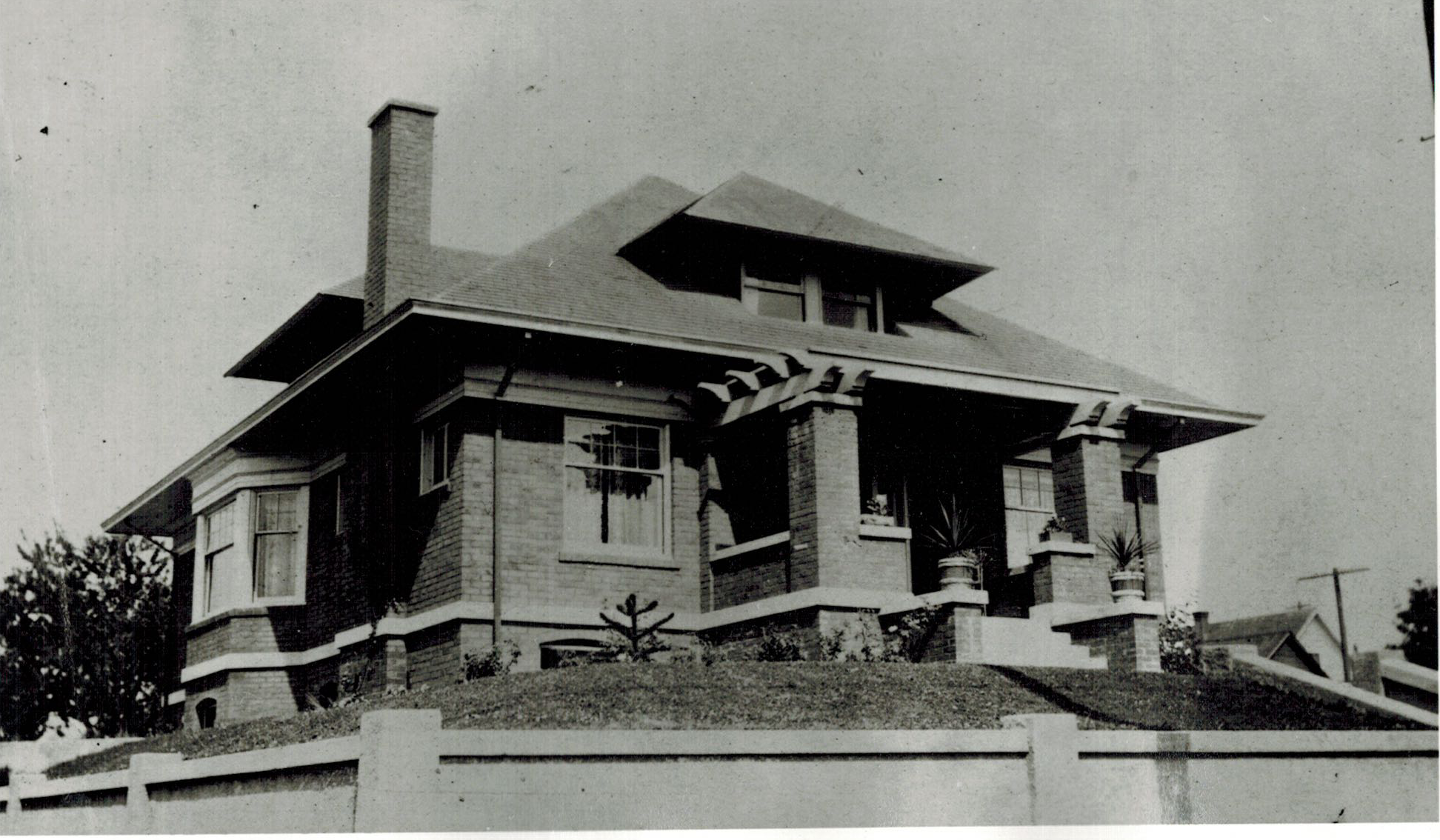
4107 N Albina Soon After Construction Facing Northwest 1910

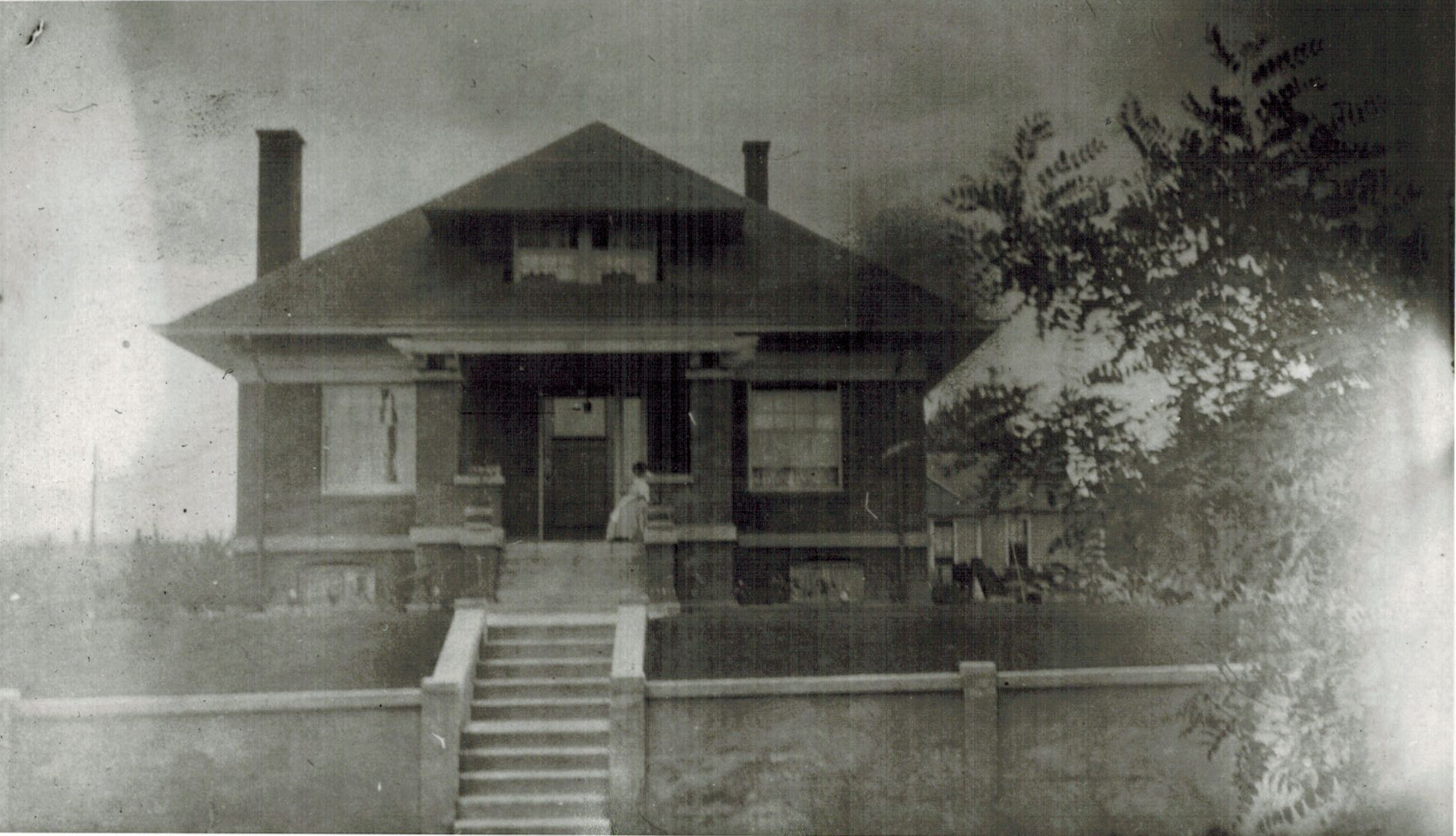
House Soon After Construction E. Facing Side 1910

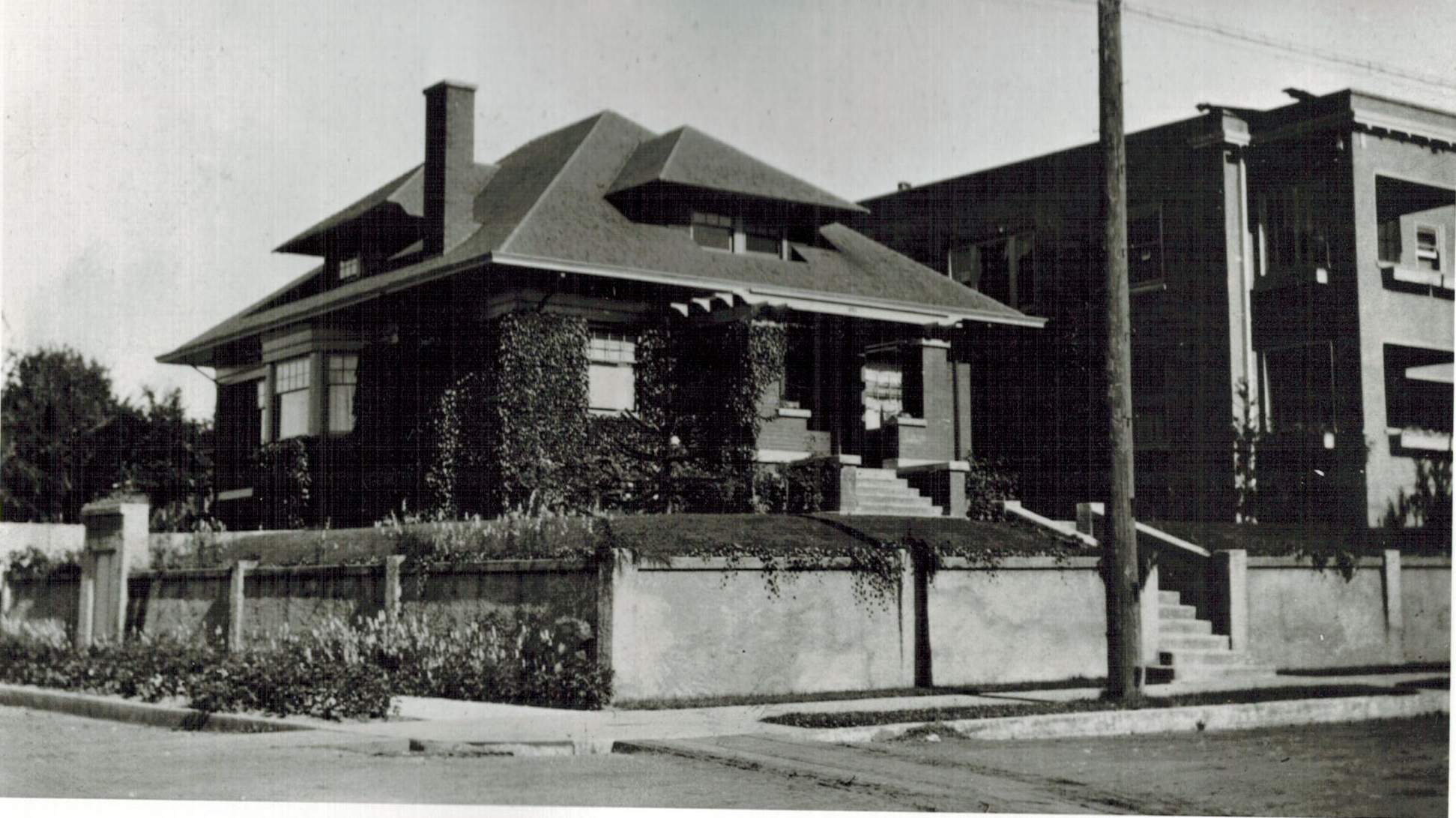
4107 N Albina, East and South Sides Circa 1911-1920

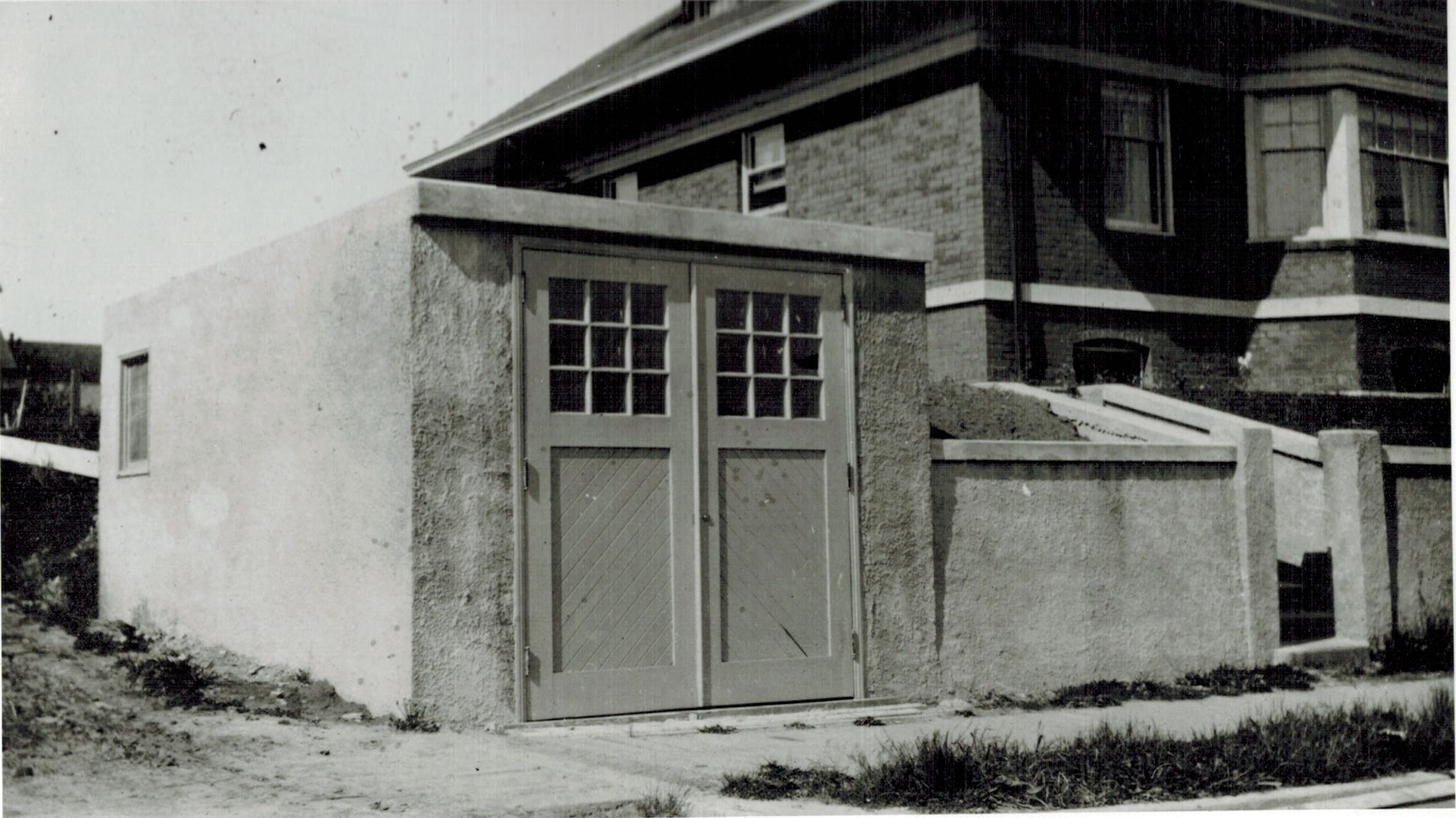
4107 N Albina Alley Garage 1909-1911

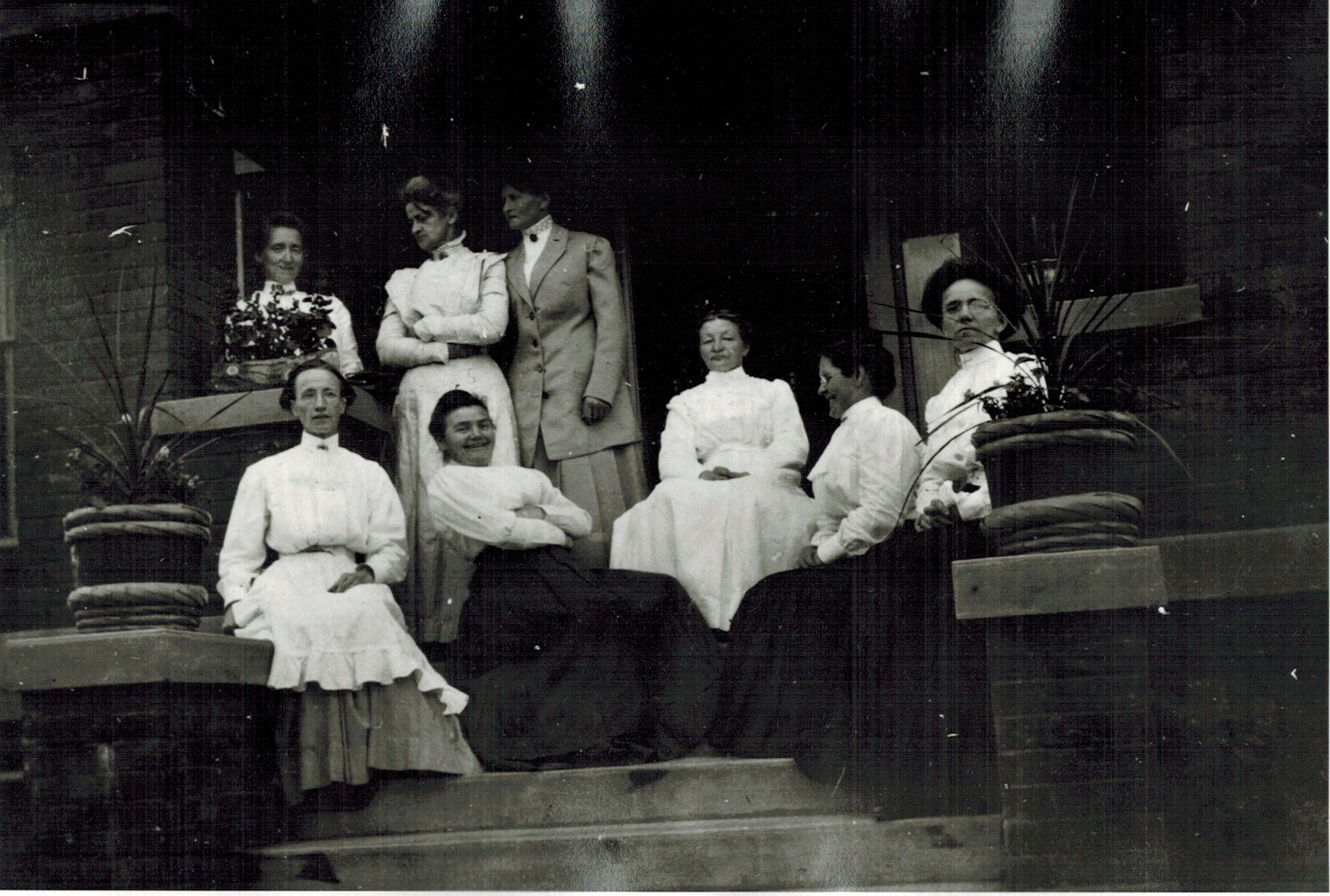
Porch of 4107 N Albina House with Mrs. Jeppesen and Friends Circa 1910

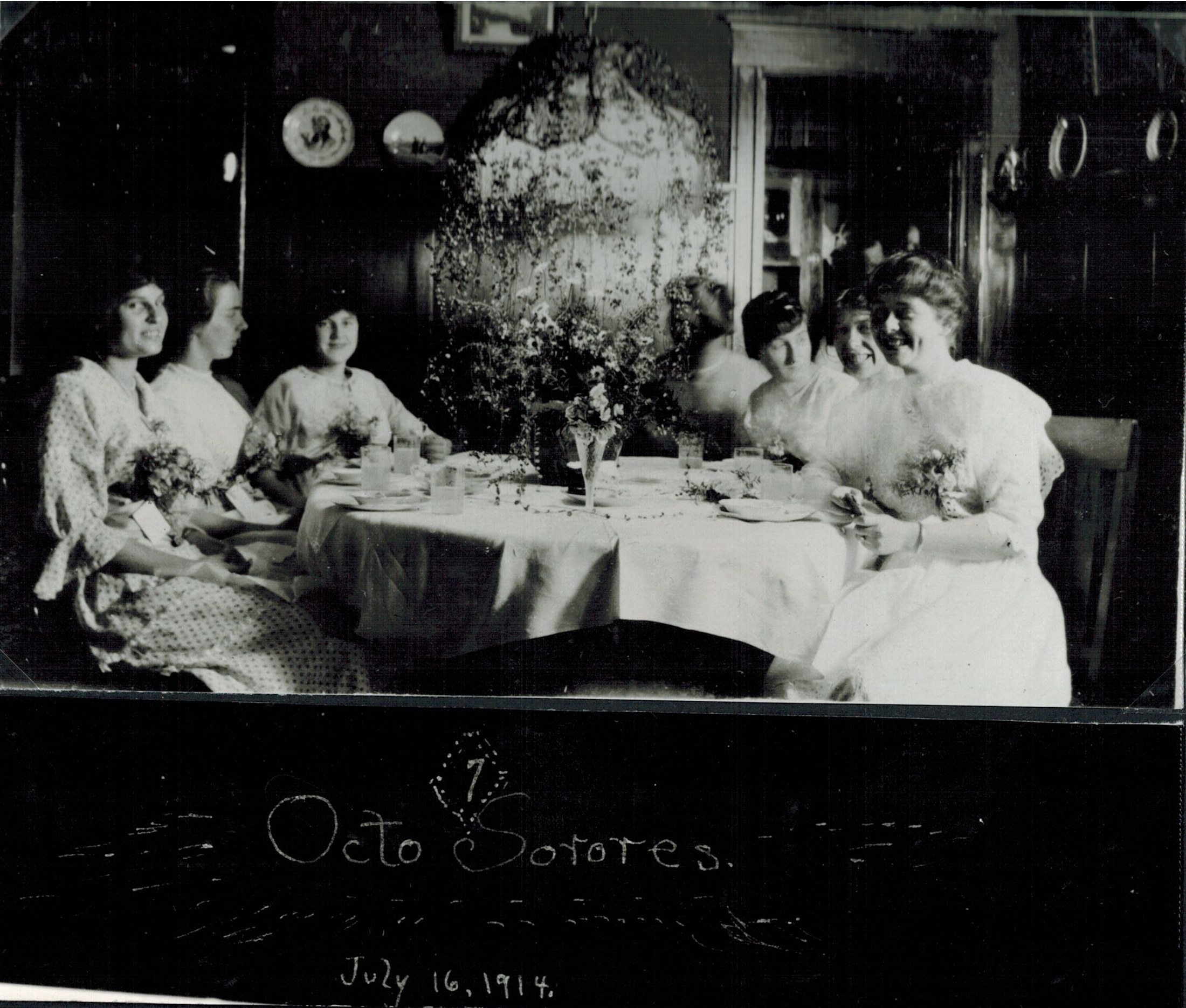
4107 N Albina Dining Room with Octo Sorores Group Meeting July 16, 1914

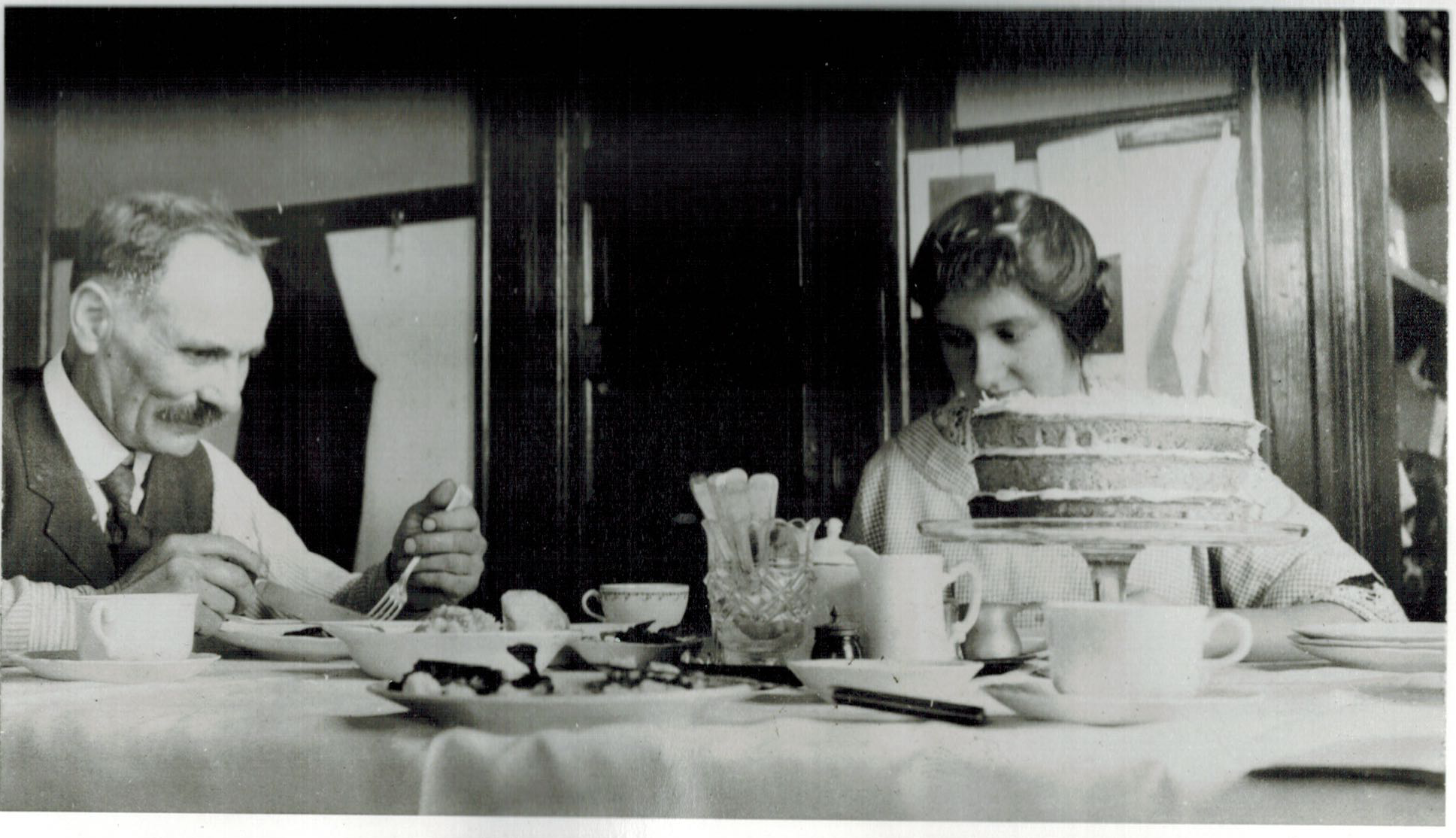
4107 N Albina Kitchen with Original Residents Peter and Dagmar Jeppesen (Father and Daughter)

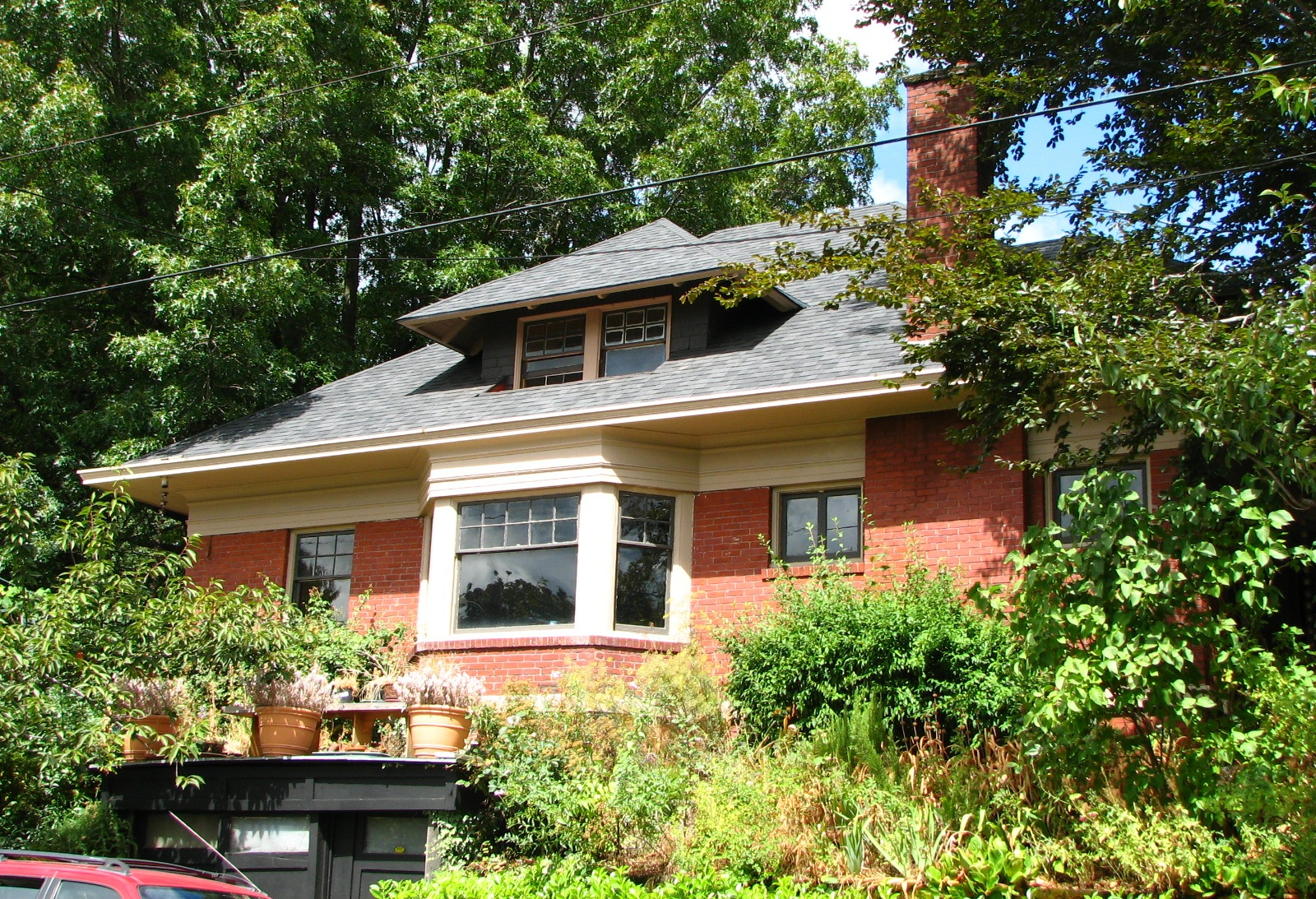
4107 N Albina, 2008 Era

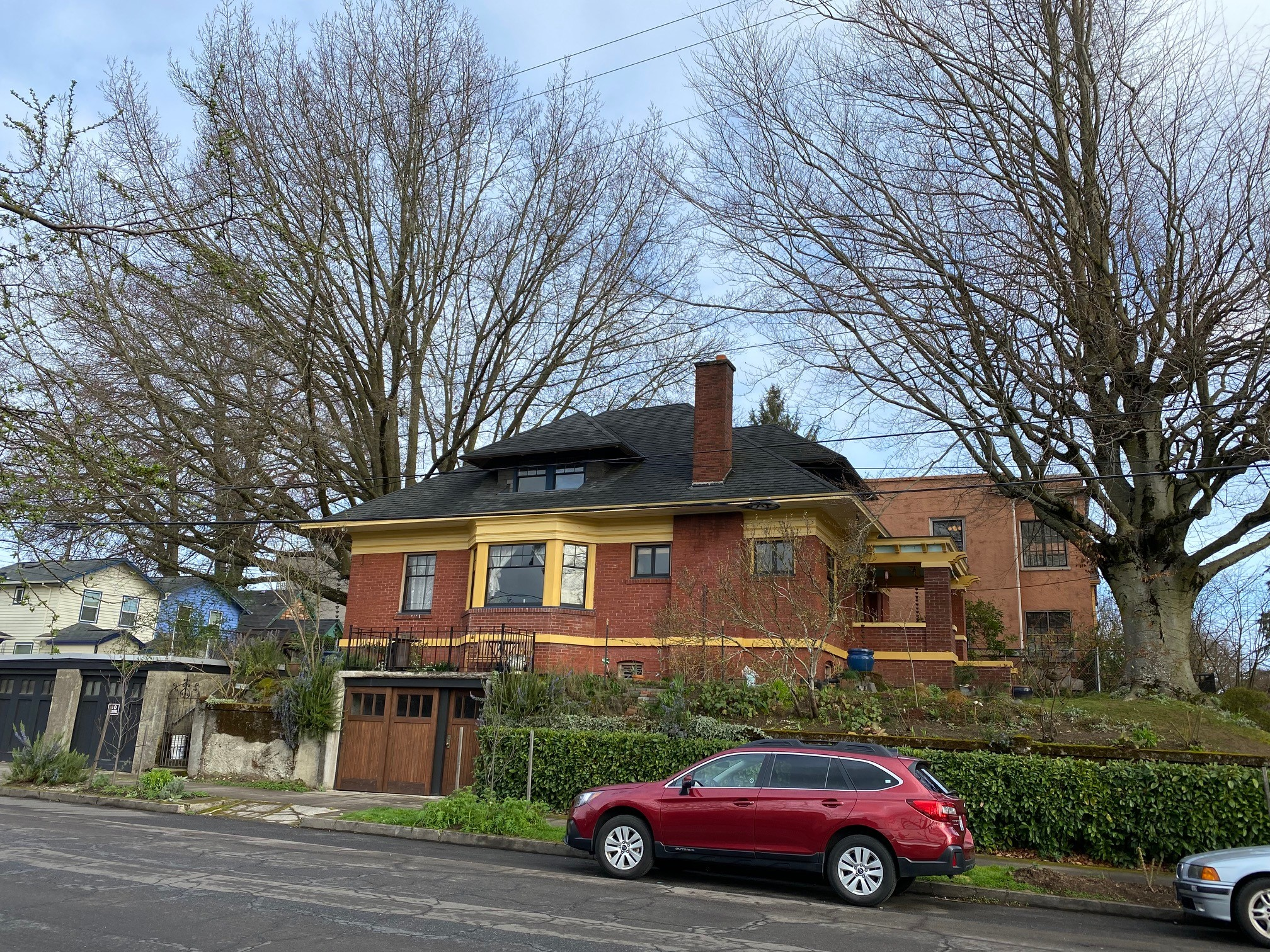
4107 N Albina S. Facing Side 2020

== See also ==
- National Register of Historic Places listings in North Portland, Oregon
