= Christine Becker House =

Historic building in Portland, Oregon, U.S.

- U.S. National Register of Historic Places
- Portland Historic Landmark
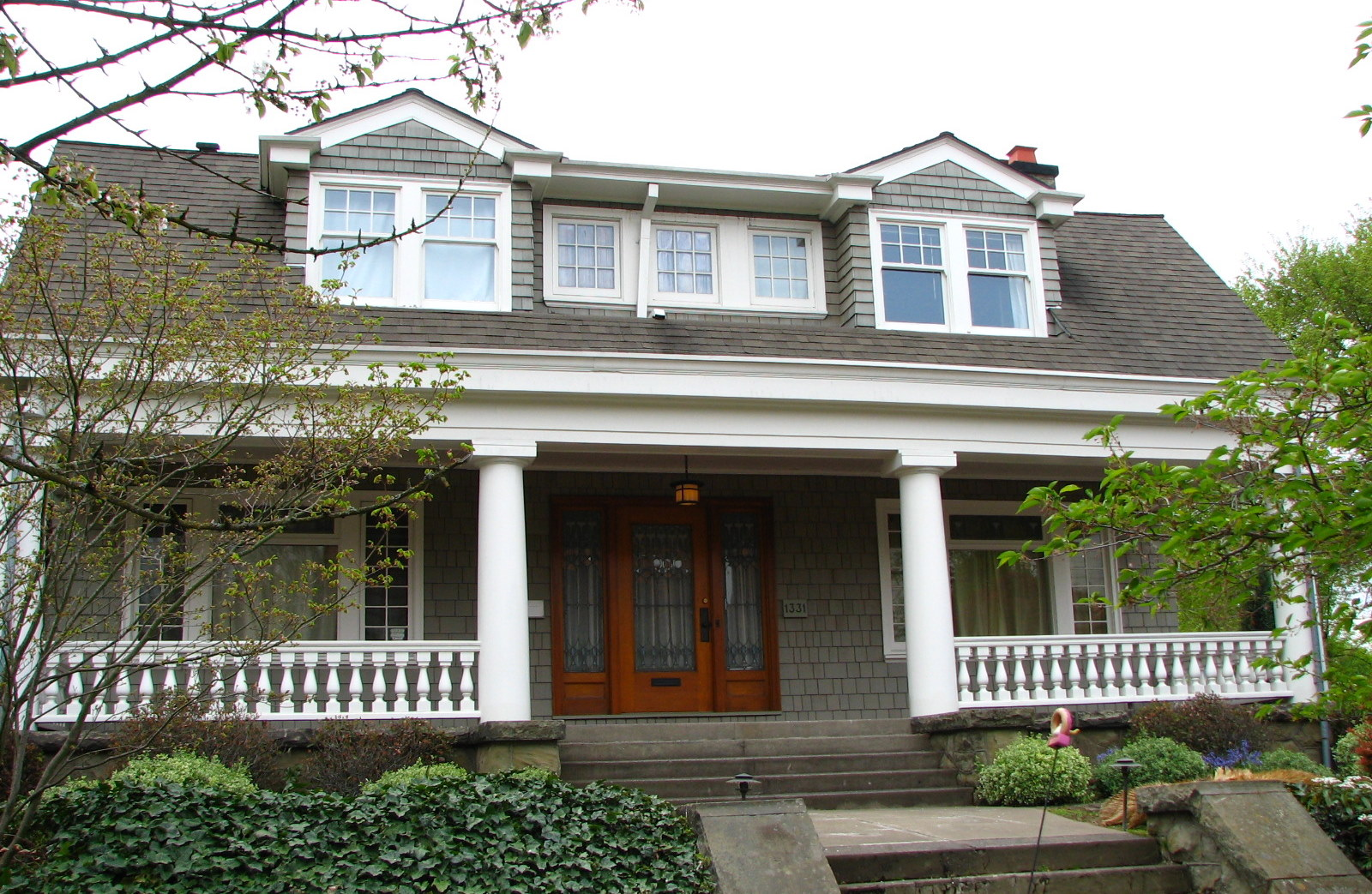
- The Becker House in 2009

- Location within Portland, Oregon
- Location: 1331 NW 25th Avenue; Portland, Oregon
- Coordinates: 45°31′57″N 122°42′11″W
- Built: 1909
- Architect: Emil Schacht & Son
- Architectural style: Colonial Revival
- NRHP reference No.: 91000142
- Added to NRHP: February 28, 1991

The Christine Becker House is a house located in northwest Portland, Oregon listed on the National Register of Historic Places.

== See also ==
- National Register of Historic Places listings in Northwest Portland, Oregon
