= Astoria Fire House No. 2 =

- U.S. National Register of Historic Places
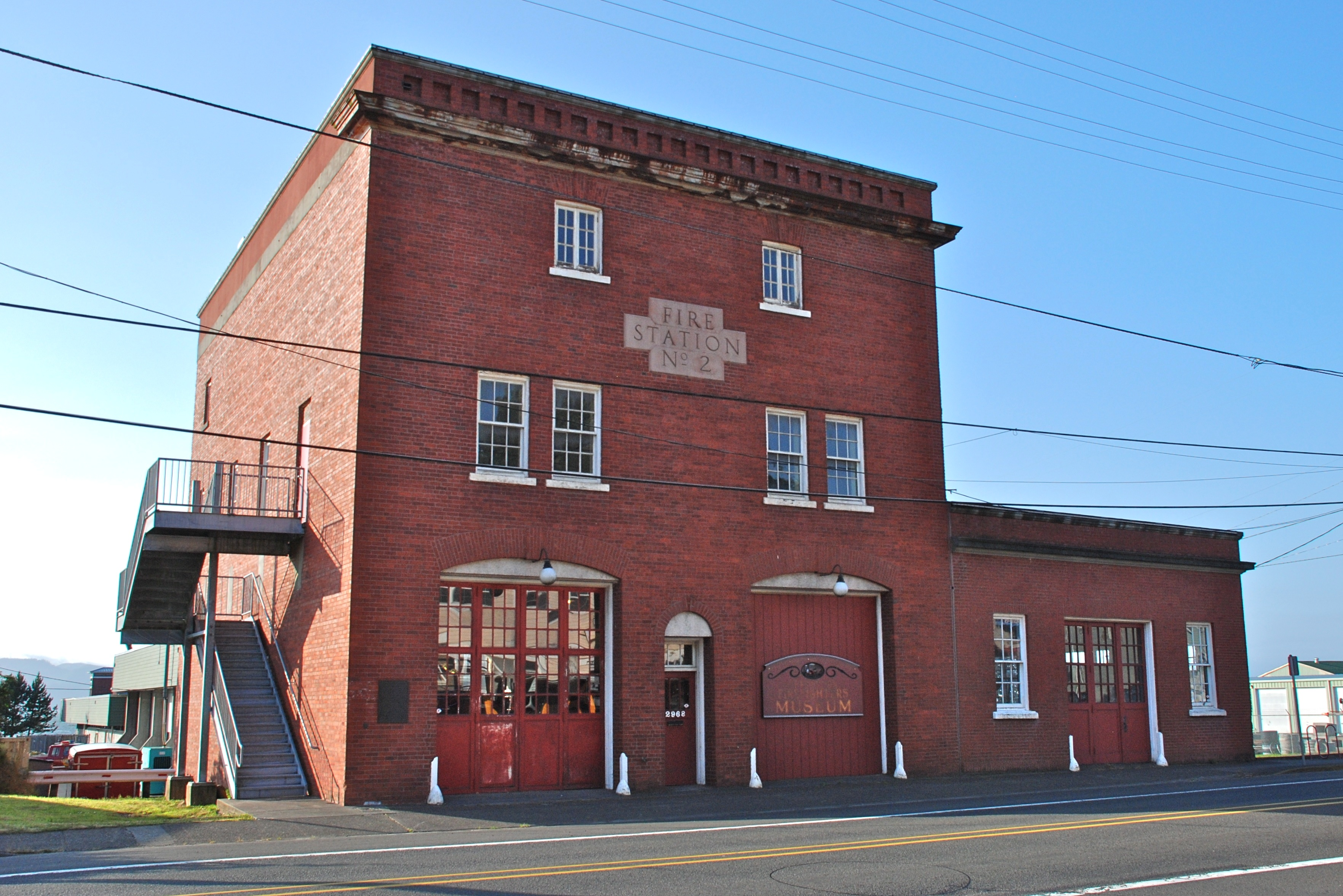
- The Astoria Fire House No. 2 in 2012

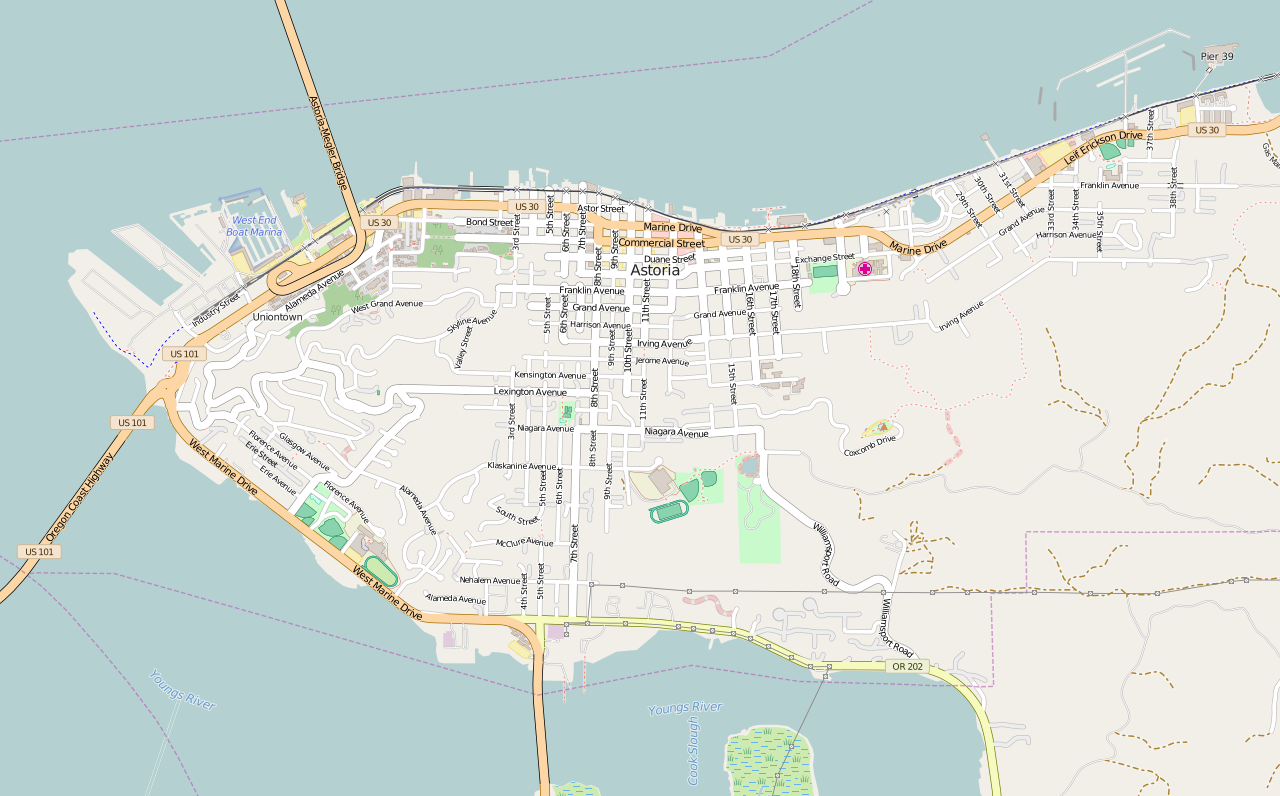
- Location within Astoria OR
- Location: 2968 Marine Drive; Astoria, Oregon
- Coordinates: 46°11′26″N 123°48′40″W
- Area: Less than 1 acre (0.40 ha)
- Built: 1896 (original), 1928–1929 (remodel)
- Architect: Emil Schacht (original), John E. Wicks (remodel)
- NRHP reference No.: 84002946
- Added to NRHP: September 7, 1984

The Astoria Fire House No. 2, also known originally as the North Pacific Brewing Company Beer Storage Building and as the Uppertown Firefighter's Museum since 1989, is a historic building located in Astoria, Oregon, United States.

The fire house was listed on the National Register of Historic Places in 1984.

The Uppertown Firefighter's Museum is operated by the Clatsop County Historical Society. The museum features fire-fighting equipment from 1879 to 1963, hand-pulled, horse-drawn, and motorized fire engines, fire fighting memorabilia and photos.

== See also ==
- Firefighting in Oregon
- National Register of Historic Places listings in Clatsop County, Oregon
