= Henry Hahn House =

Historic building in Portland, Oregon, U.S.

- U.S. National Register of Historic Places
- Portland Historic Landmark
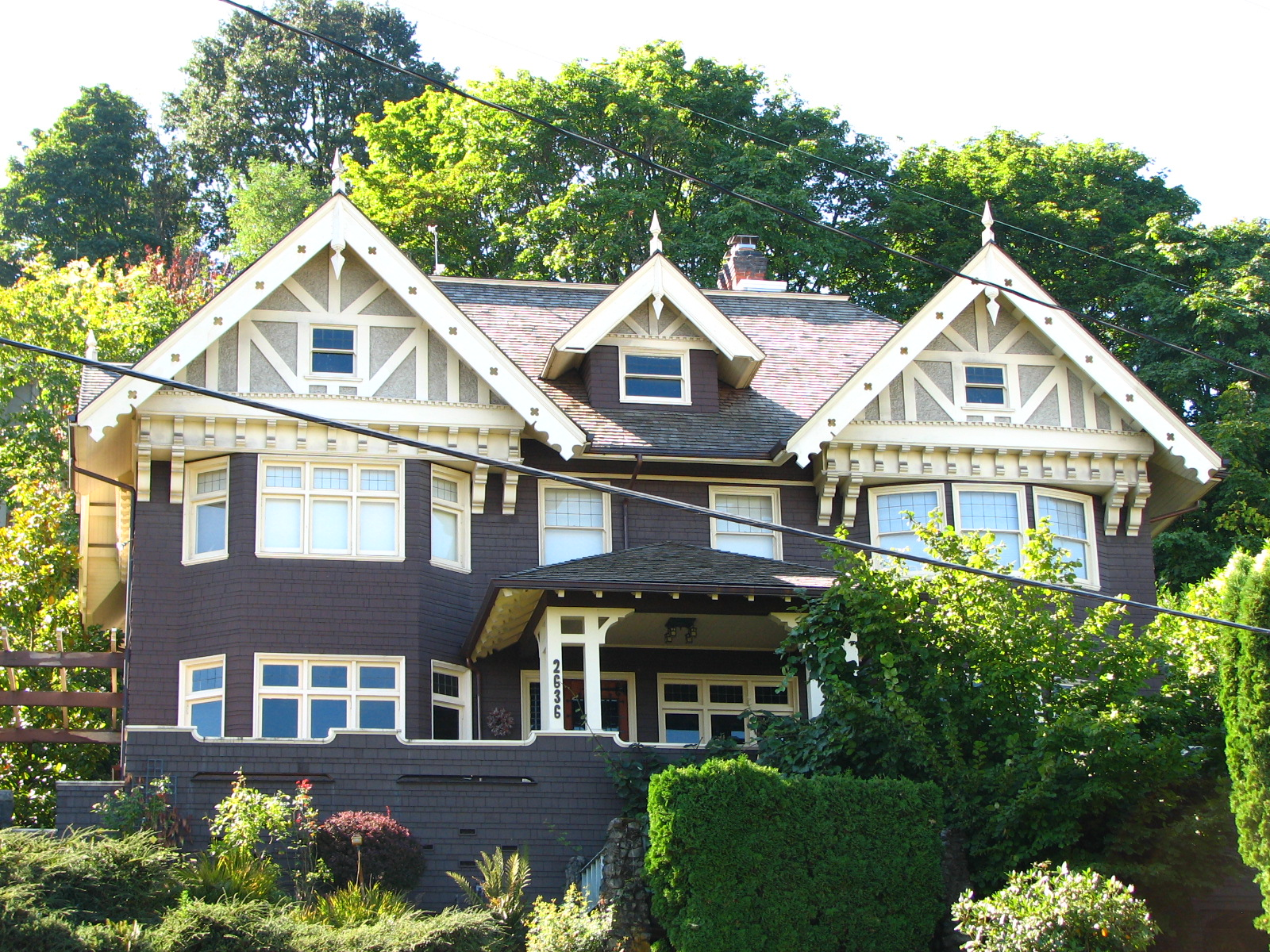

- Location within Portland, Oregon
- Location: 2636 NW Cornell Road; Portland, Oregon
- Coordinates: 45°31′49″N 122°42′21″W
- Built: 1906
- Architect: Emil Schacht
- Architectural style: Late 19th And Early 20th Century American Movements
- NRHP reference No.: 93000918
- Added to NRHP: September 9, 1993

The Henry Hahn House is a house located in northwest Portland, Oregon listed on the National Register of Historic Places.

== See also ==
- National Register of Historic Places listings in Northwest Portland, Oregon
