= Hotel Oregon =

- U.S. National Register of Historic Places
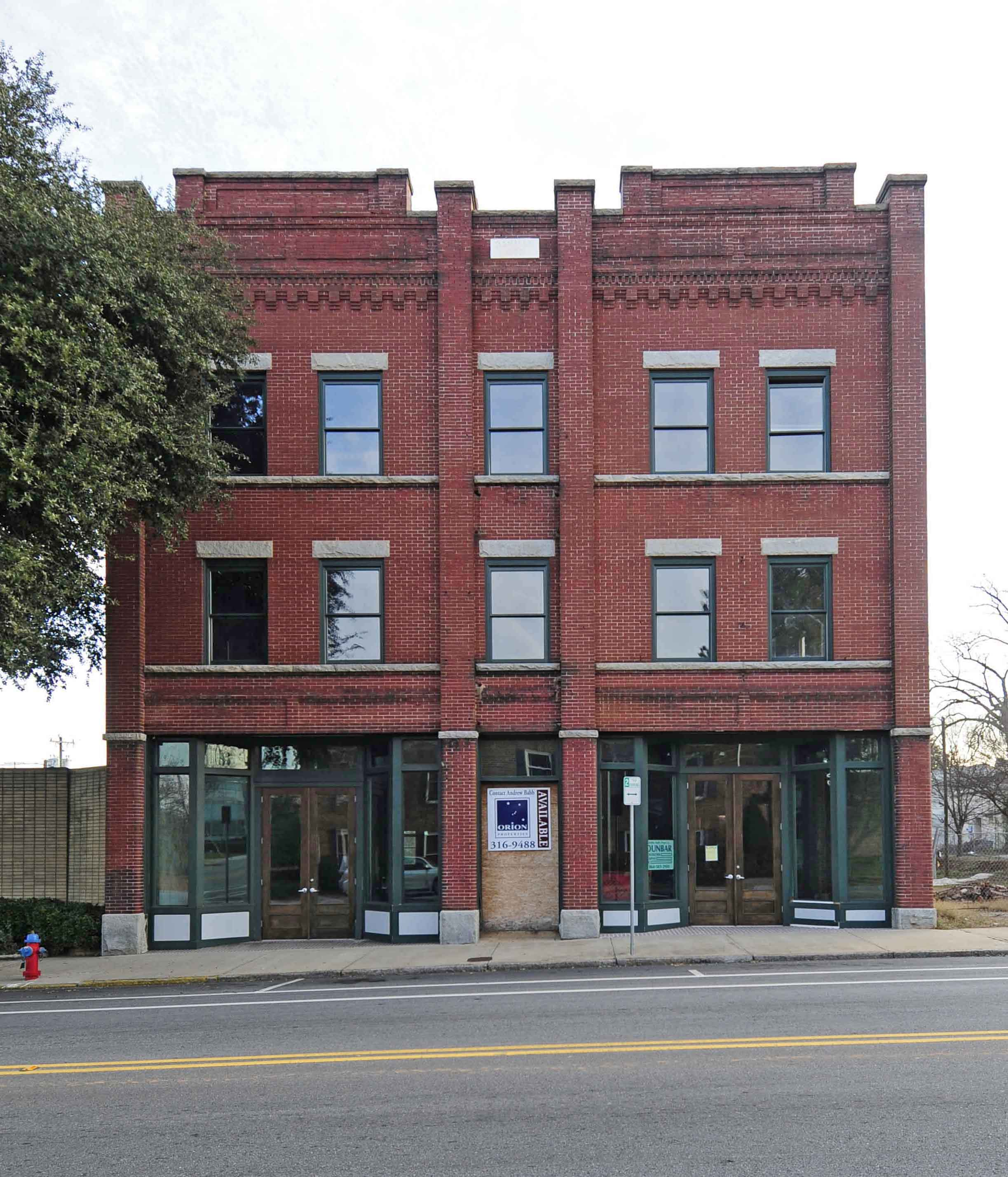
- Hotel Oregon, February 2012

- Location within South Carolina Location within the United States
- Location: 247 and 249 Magnolia St., Spartanburg, South Carolina
- Coordinates: 34°57′10″N 81°56′11″W
- Area: less than one acre
- Built: 1909
- Architectural style: Early Commercial
- NRHP reference No.: 01000311
- Added to NRHP: April 10, 2001

Hotel Oregon, also known as Oakman Drugs, Oakman Glass, and Spartan Hotel, is a historic hotel building located at Spartanburg, Spartanburg County, South Carolina. It was built in 1909, and is a three-story, brick building with two first floor storefronts. It features horizontal granite belt courses, decorative brick panels, brick cornices, and a stepped front parapet.

It was listed on the National Register of Historic Places in 2001.
