= Pacific Coast Biscuit Company Building =

Historic building in Portland, Oregon, U.S.

- U.S. National Register of Historic Places
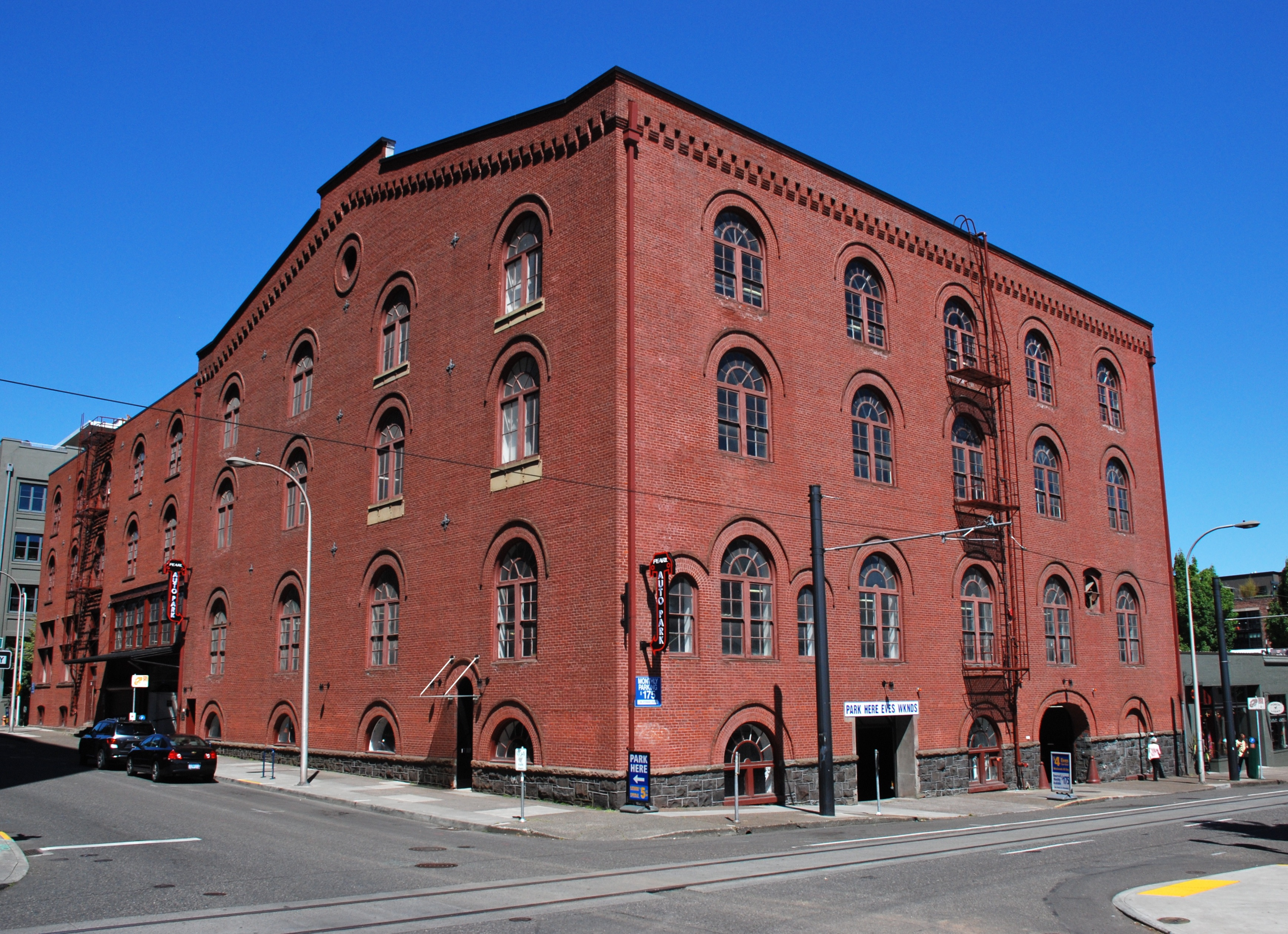

- Location within Portland, Oregon
- Location: 1101-1129 NW Davis St, Portland, Oregon
- Coordinates: 45°31′28.5″N 122°40′56.9″W
- Built: 1891
- Architectural style: Romanesque
- NRHP reference No.: 98000212
- Added to NRHP: March 5, 1998

The Pacific Coast Biscuit Company Building is a building located in northwest Portland, Oregon, listed on the National Register of Historic Places. The building originally housed the Portland Cracker Company and later was home to the Pacific Coast Biscuit Company.

== See also ==
- National Register of Historic Places listings in Northwest Portland, Oregon
