= Pacific Coast Biscuit Company =

Baking company conglomerate in Oregon, USA

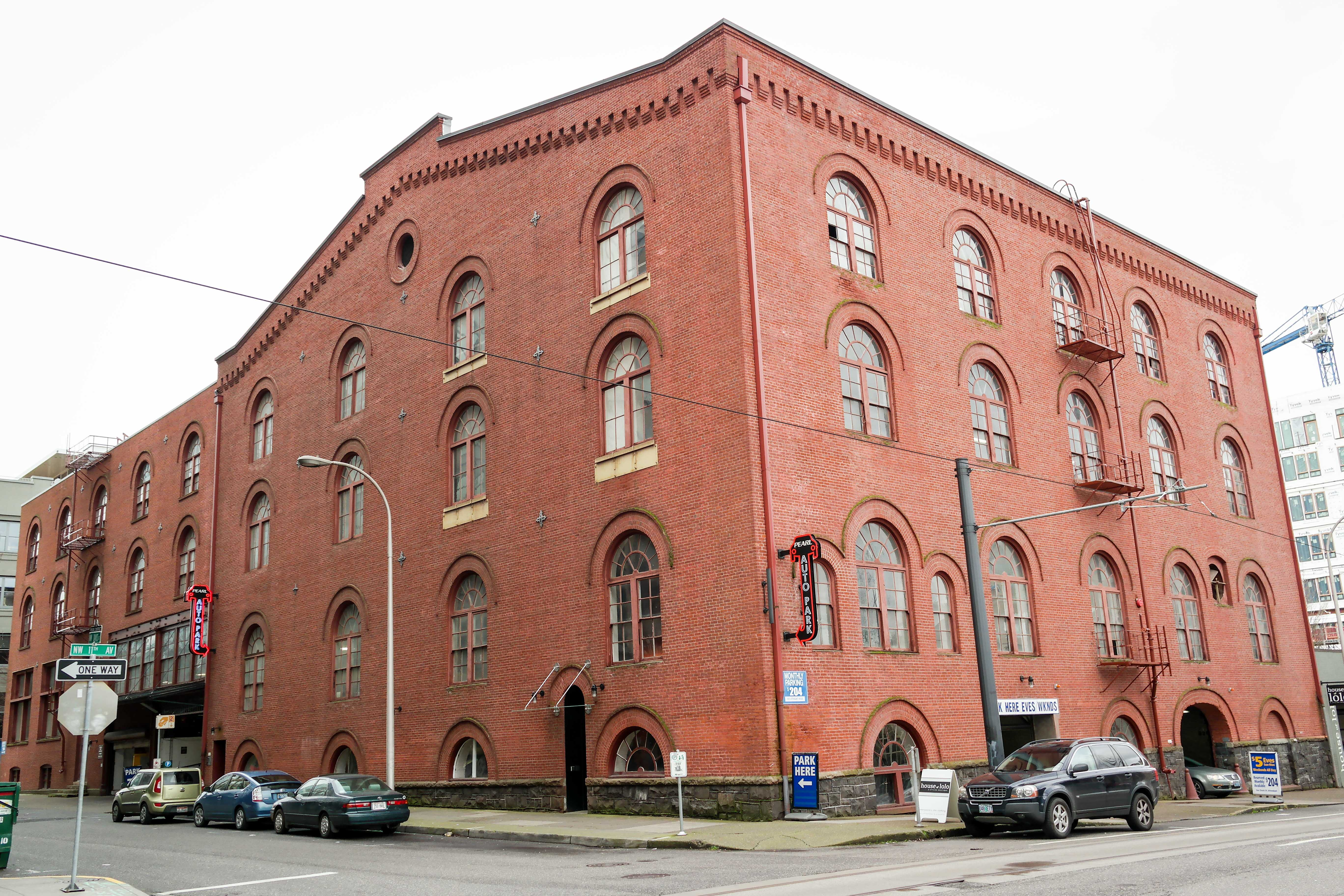
- The Pacific Coast Biscuit Company Building in Portland, Oregon
- Formerly: Portland Biscuit Company
- Company type: Public
- Industry: Snack foods
- Fate: Purchased by Nabisco in 1930
- Headquarters: Portland, Oregon
- Key people: Charles M. Warner, John C. Hanrahan, William M. Laws, Herman Wittenberg, Moritz Thomsen, Charles Hotchkiss, A.M. Brookes
- Products: Biscuits and Crackers
- Brands: Abetta Biscuit, Abetta Oatmeal Crackers, Parfait Sugar Wafers, Fiesta Sugar Wafers, Elite Tea Biscuit, Toke Point Oysterettes, Fig Sultana, Marshmallo Dainties, Hoo Hoo Gingersnaps, Maritani Fruit Biscuit, Cocoanut Dainties, Old Fashioned Sugar Cookies, Zwieback, Fancy Assorted Cakes, Cheese Sandwich, Animal Box Crackers

The Pacific Coast Biscuit Company was a conglomerate of baking companies headquartered in Portland, Oregon, United States that manufactured cookies, crackers, candy, and macaroni. The company, also known as Pacific Coast, was formed in 1899, and it was purchased by the National Biscuit Company in 1930. It was the only baking company in the United States to trademark a swastika.

== History ==
In the late 19th century, regional baking companies combined to form larger conglomerates, often known as Cracker Trusts. Of these, the largest was the National Biscuit Company that included 114 baking companies. It was incorporated in New Jersey in February 1898, and the company was later renamed Nabisco. Prior to modern securities law, it was not uncommon for companies to inflate the value of their assets. Nabisco, for example, was capitalized at $55,000,000, but its estimated value in real assets was less than $25,000,000. Writing in Moody's Magazine, John Moody referred to the $30,000,000 discrepancy as "water." The Pacific Coast Biscuit Company was formed to compete against Nabisco. It was incorporated in New Jersey in May 1899, and included seven companies that together controlled most of the commercial biscuit and cracker business west of the Rocky Mountains. The companies, also known as the Cracker Trust, were

- Portland Cracker Co. of Portland
- Oregon Cracker Co. of Portland
- Seattle Cracker and Candy Co. of Seattle
- Washington Cracker Co. of Spokane
- American Biscuit Co. of San Francisco
- Standard Biscuit Co. of San Francisco
- Southern California Cracker Co. of Los Angeles

Although the combined assets of the seven companies were valued at less than $1,000,000, capitalization was $4,000,000, and the United States Investor described the trust as "a stock jobbing scheme, whereby the operators hope to make a lot of money out of the investing public."

Three of the subsidiaries, the Washington Cracker Company, the Oregon Cracker Company, and the Portland Cracker Company were owned by Herman Wittenberg, an entrepreneur specializing in biscuit and cracker company management. Wittenberg started the Portland Cracker Company in 1886, and in the years thereafter he purchased several competing firms in Oregon and Washington. When Pacific Coast was organized, Wittenberg became vice president, and he remained in that office until the time of his death in 1912.

== Swastika trade mark ==
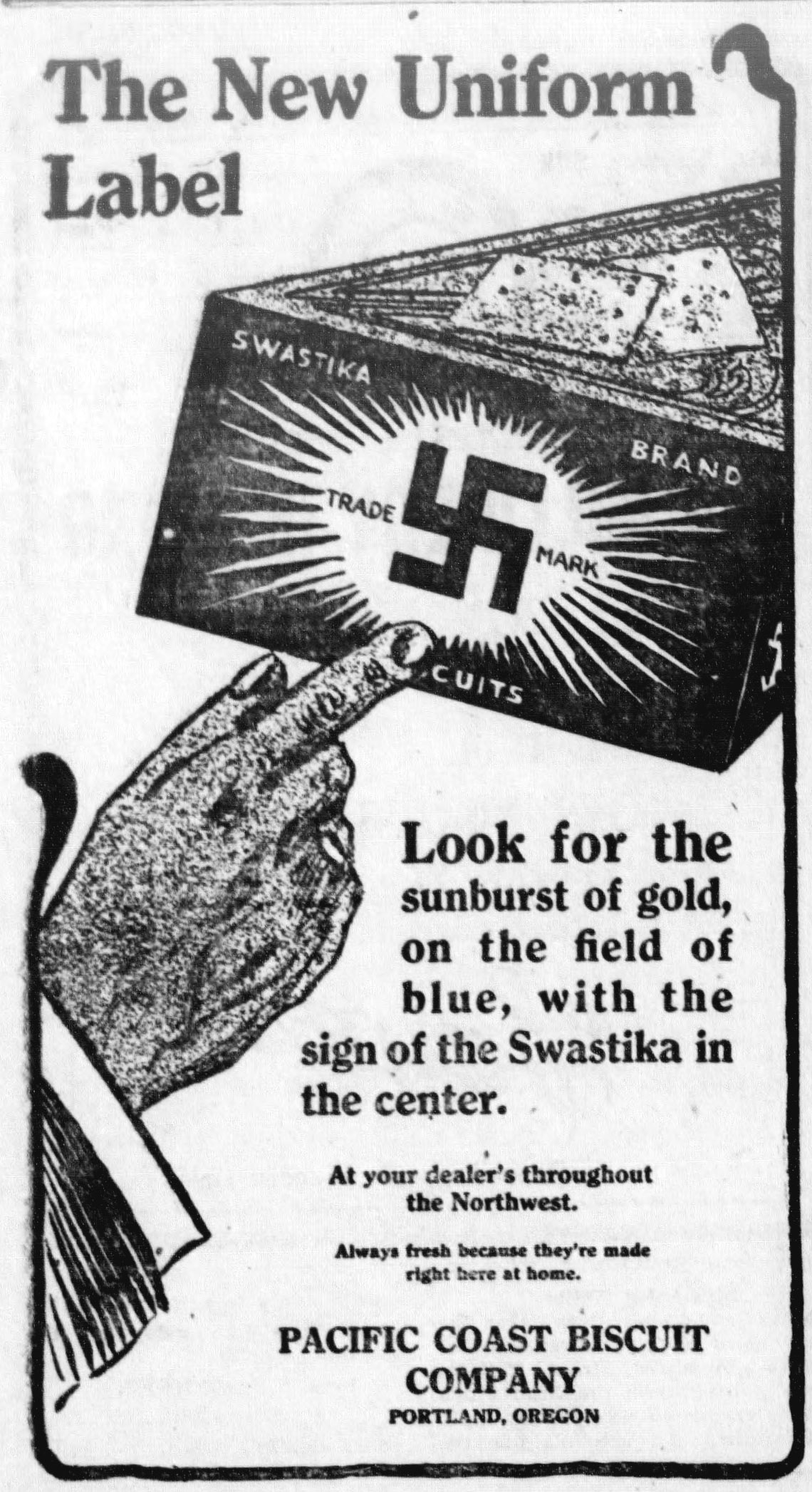
1915 ad

In 1907 Pacific Coast began using a red swastika trademark in its marketing. In the early 20th century, swastika references in Pacific states were not unknown: for example, in 1914 the first cinema in Sausalito, California, opened under the name "Swastika Theatre". Pacific Coast's packaging was designed to mimic that of Nabisco, and Pacific Coast's swastika was similar in color and placement to Nabisco's in-er-seal trademark, although it did not resemble the shape of Nabisco's trademark.

== Nabisco lawsuit ==
In 1914 Nabisco sued Pacific Coast in federal court for unfair competition and trademark infringement. The court found that Pacific Coast had engaged in unfair practices and issued an injunction barring the company from marketing several brands that were packaged similar to those of Nabisco, and the court ordered Pacific Coast to stop using its red swastika trademark. As a result of the court decision, Pacific Coast altered its packaging and redesigned its swastika.

In 1930 Nabisco purchased Pacific Coast Biscuit Company and continued to operate its brands, and the swastika was replaced by Nabisco's in-er-seal logo.

== See also ==
- Pacific Coast Biscuit Company Building
- Oregon Cracker Company Building
