= Senate Court Apartments =

Historic building in Portland, Oregon, U.S.

- U.S. National Register of Historic Places
- Portland Historic Landmark
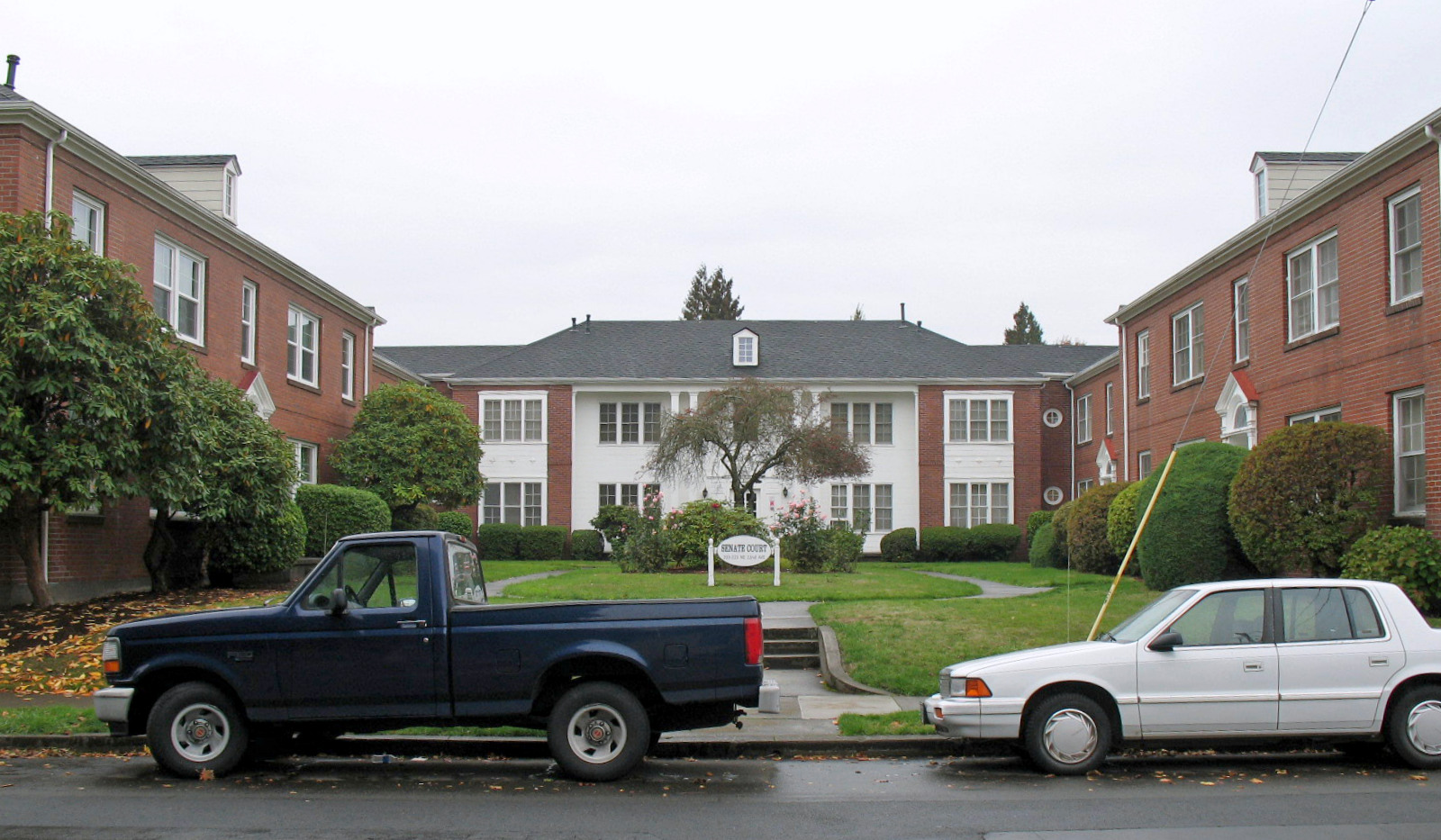
- The building in 2009

- Location within the United States Location within Oregon Location within Portland, Oregon
- Location: 203–223 NE 22nd Avenue; Portland, Oregon
- Coordinates: 45°31′28″N 122°38′38″W
- Built: 1944
- Built by: Douglas W. Lowell
- Architect: Roscoe Hemenway
- Architectural style: Colonial Revival
- NRHP reference No.: 97000129
- Added to NRHP: February 21, 1997

The Senate Court Apartments are a historic apartment building located in Portland, Oregon, United States. It is an important work in the career of Portland architect Roscoe Hemenway, who generally focused on single-family residential designs. In it, Hemenway employed the Colonial Revival style to draw out an air of respectability and tradition, in an effort to make apartment living more appealing to a middle-class clientele. Built in 1944 for developer Douglas W. Lowell, the complex was aimed at single women working in war industries. Lowell went on to develop over 3,000 housing units in Portland through his career.

The building was entered on the National Register of Historic Places in 1997.

== See also ==
- National Register of Historic Places listings in Northeast Portland, Oregon
