= Failing Building (disambiguation) =

Failing Building is a historic building in Portland, Oregon, U.S.

Failing Building may also refer to these historic buildings in Portland, Oregon, United States, named for the Failing family:

- Oregon Marine Supply Building, also known as the Failing Building, a contributing property to the Portland Skidmore/Old Town Historic District
- Postal Building (Portland, Oregon), also known as the Failing Building

== See also ==
- Failing School (Portland, Oregon)
