= Charles F. Adams House =

Historic building in Portland, Oregon, U.S.

- U.S. National Register of Historic Places
- U.S. Historic district – Contributing property
- Portland Historic Landmark
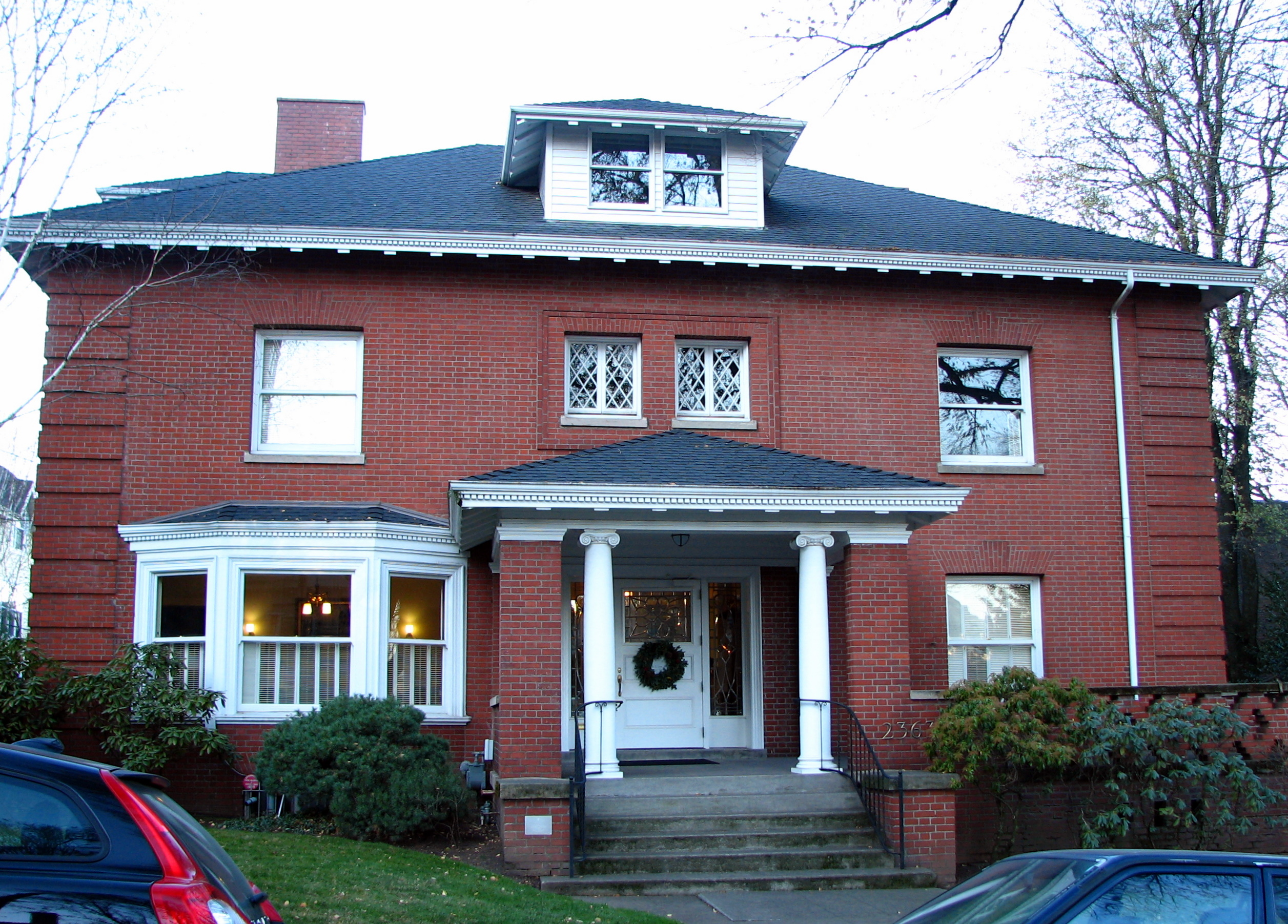
- Charles F. Adams House in 2009

- Location within Portland, Oregon Location within Oregon Location within the United States
- Location: 2363 NW Flanders Street; Portland, Oregon
- Coordinates: 45°31′33″N 122°41′59″W
- Built: 1904
- Architect: Whidden & Lewis
- Architectural style: Georgian Revival
- Restored: 1979
- Part of: Alphabet Historic District (ID00001293)
- NRHP reference No.: 81000513
- Added to NRHP: December 9, 1981

The Charles F. Adams House is a historic house located in northwest Portland, Oregon, United States. It was designed by the eminent firm of Whidden and Lewis, one of a trio of adjacent residences designed by that firm. Built in the Georgian Revival style in 1904 and expanded in 1918, it was extensively restored in 1979. The original owner was Charles Francis Adams (1862–1943), a scion of the family of presidents John Adams and John Quincy Adams, and a prominent Portland banker, art collector, and patron of the Portland Art Museum.

The house was listed on the National Register of Historic Places in 1981.

== See also ==
- National Register of Historic Places listings in Northwest Portland, Oregon
- Bates–Seller House, neighboring by same architect
- Trevett–Nunn House, neighboring by same architect
