= Wilcox Building (Portland, Oregon) =

Historic building in Portland, Oregon, U.S.

- U.S. National Register of Historic Places
- Portland Historic Landmark
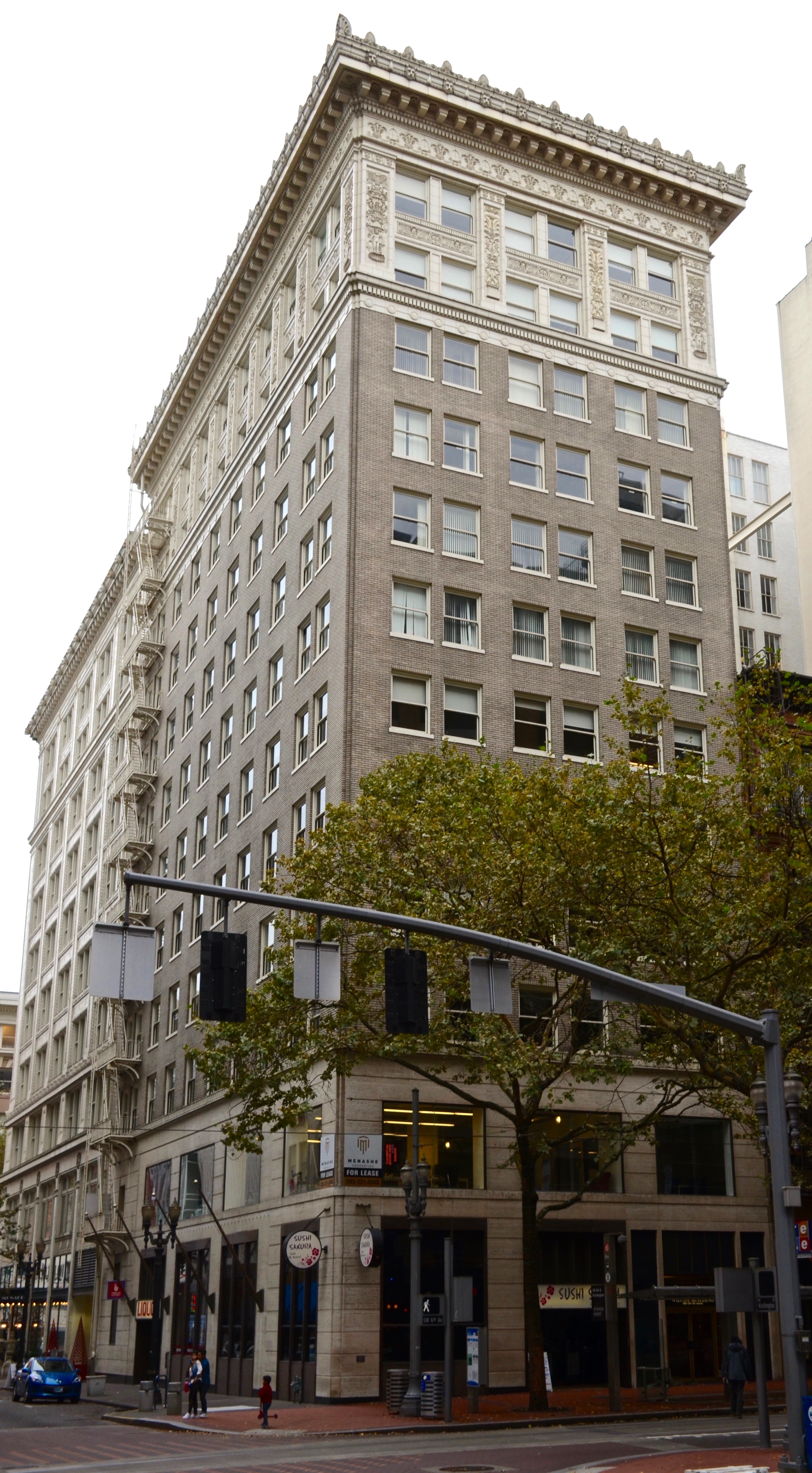
- Viewed from the northwest in 2016

- Location within Portland, Oregon Location within Oregon Location within the United States
- Location: 506 SW 6th Avenue; Portland, Oregon
- Coordinates: 45°31′13″N 122°40′39″W
- Built: 1911
- Architect: Whidden and Lewis
- Architectural style: Chicago, Commercial Style
- NRHP reference No.: 89000058
- Added to NRHP: February 23, 1989

The Wilcox Building is a building located in downtown Portland, Oregon, listed on the National Register of Historic Places. The building was designed by Whidden and Lewis. The design is similar to the Failing Office Building (1907) and Stevens Building (1914), also by Whidden and Lewis.

== See also ==
- National Register of Historic Places listings in Southwest Portland, Oregon
