= Stevens Building (Portland, Oregon) =

Historic building in Portland, Oregon, U.S.

- U.S. National Register of Historic Places
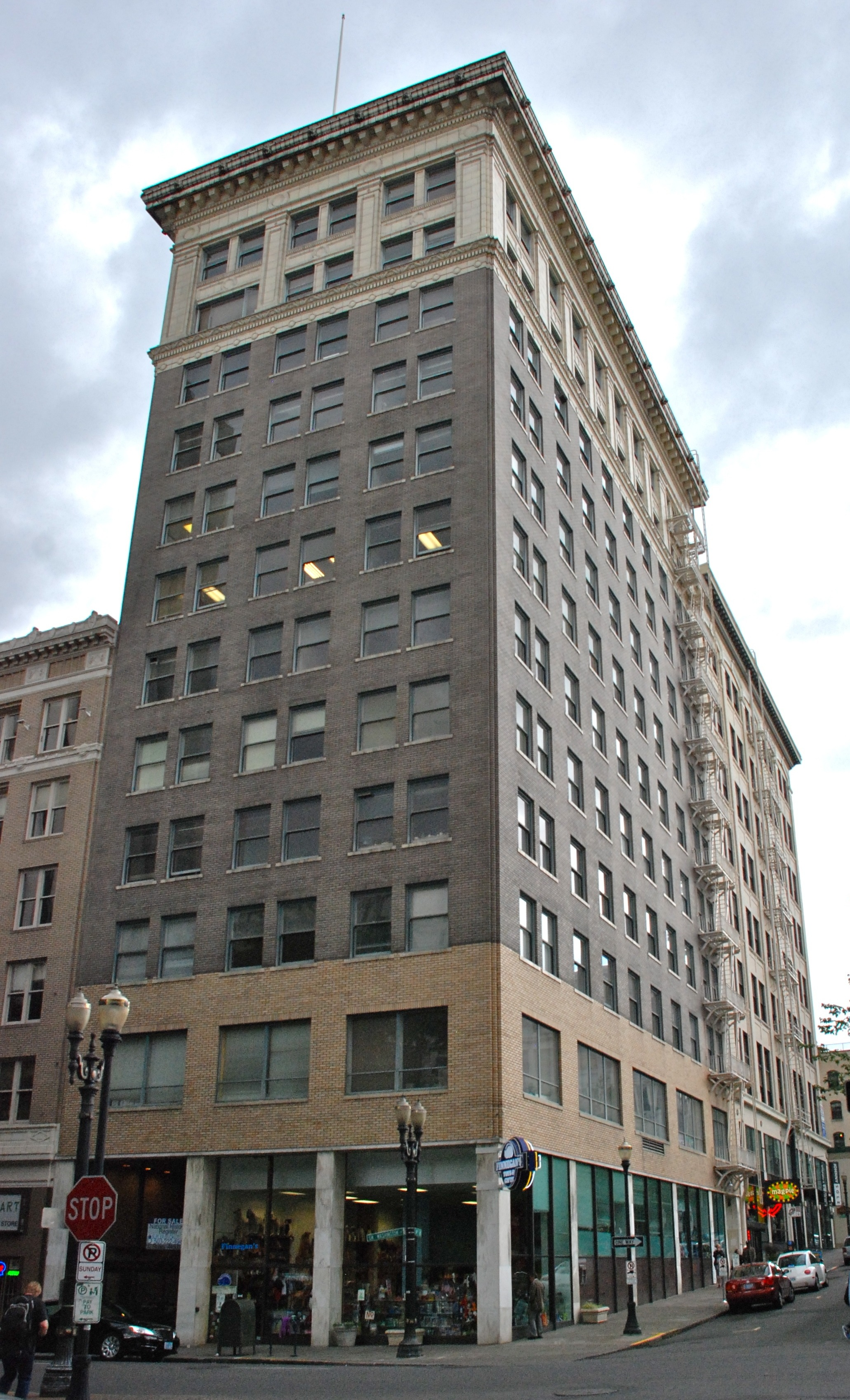
- The Stevens Building in 2012

- Location within Portland, Oregon Location within Oregon Location within the United States
- Location: 812 SW Washington Street; Portland, Oregon
- Coordinates: 45°31′15″N 122°40′49″W
- Area: 0.1 acres (0.040 ha)
- Built: 1913–14
- Architect: Whidden & Lewis
- Architectural style: Late 19th and Early 20th Century American Movements, Skyscraper
- NRHP reference No.: 98000213
- Added to NRHP: March 5, 1998

The Stevens Building is a commercial and office building located in downtown Portland, Oregon, listed on the National Register of Historic Places. The 12-story building was designed by Whidden & Lewis. The design is similar to the Failing Office Building (1907) and Wilcox Building (1911), also by Whidden & Lewis. Construction began in August 1913 and was completed in 1914, with the building opening on May 1, 1914. The total construction cost was $375,000 (equivalent to $12.05 million in 2025). The building is approximately 152 feet (46 m) tall.

Most of the building's original tenants were doctors and dentists and their patient clinics, and the building's design was adapted for that use. The building was renovated in 1954 to designs by architect Pietro Belluschi.

In 2008, it was purchased by the Church of Scientology for $5.38 million, with the expectation of becoming the headquarters for its Portland chapter. In 2010, they bought the Sherlock Building, also located in downtown Portland, after learning that the Stevens Building would be too expensive to renovate for their purposes. The Church sold the building in October 2013 for $4.35 million to Arthur Mutal Investments LLC, who plan to turn it into a hotel.

== Tenants ==
As of September 2011, one of the ground-floor tenants of the building is Finnegan's Toys & Gifts, who moved to 820 SW Washington Street after occupying the Blanchard Building at 922 SW Yamhill Street since 1981.

== See also ==
- National Register of Historic Places listings in Southwest Portland, Oregon
