= Concord Building =

Historic building in Portland, Oregon, U.S.

- U.S. National Register of Historic Places
- Portland Historic Landmark
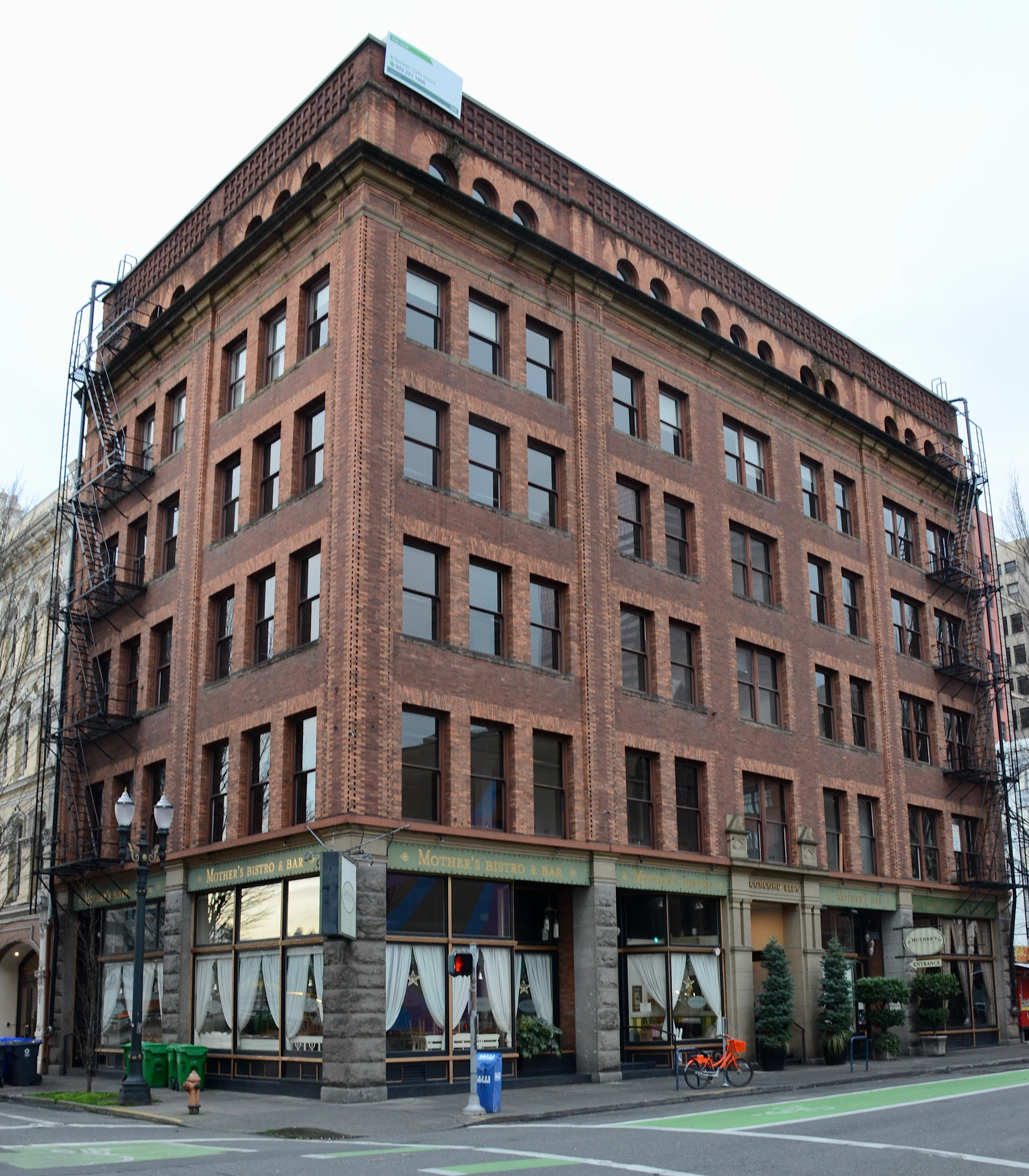
- The building's exterior in 2018

- Location within Portland, Oregon Location within Oregon Location within the United States
- Location: 208 SW Stark Street; Portland, Oregon
- Coordinates: 45°31′12″N 122°40′26″W
- Area: 0.1 acres (0.040 ha)
- Built: 1891
- Architect: Whidden & Lewis
- Architectural style: Early Commercial
- NRHP reference No.: 77001110
- Added to NRHP: October 21, 1977

The Concord Building is a building located in downtown Portland, Oregon listed on the National Register of Historic Places.

== See also ==
- National Register of Historic Places listings in Southwest Portland, Oregon
