= Postal Building (Portland, Oregon) =

Historic building in Portland, Oregon, U.S.

- U.S. National Register of Historic Places
- Portland Historic Landmark
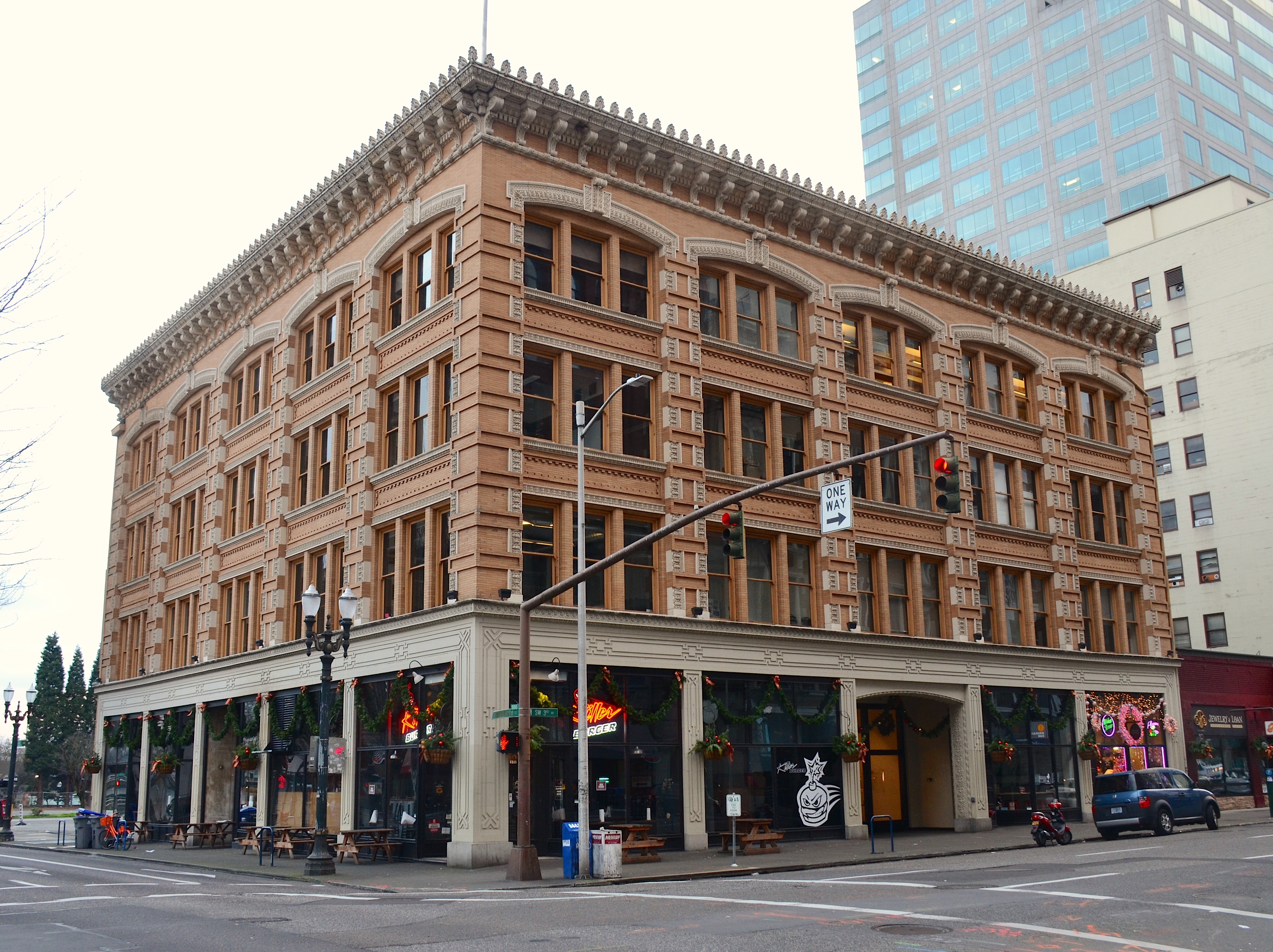
- Viewed from the northwest in 2018

- Location within Portland, Oregon Location within Oregon Location within the United States
- Location: 510 SW 3rd Avenue; Portland, Oregon
- Coordinates: 45°31′09″N 122°40′28″W
- Built: 1901
- Architect: Whidden & Lewis
- Architectural style: Late 19th And 20th Century Revivals, Second Renaissance Revival
- NRHP reference No.: 78002321
- Added to NRHP: March 14, 1978

The Postal Building was built in 1900 and is located in downtown Portland, Oregon. Designed by Whidden & Lewis, it is listed on the National Register of Historic Places. It is notable for its ornate terracotta ornament.

The building was originally built and owned by Henry Failing and called the Failing Building. In 1927 the Failing estate sold the building and it was renamed the Postal Building after the Postal Telegraph Company, a major leaseholder at the time.

== See also ==
- National Register of Historic Places listings in Southwest Portland, Oregon
- Failing Office Building
