= Arlington Club =

Historic building in Portland, Oregon, U.S.

- U.S. National Register of Historic Places
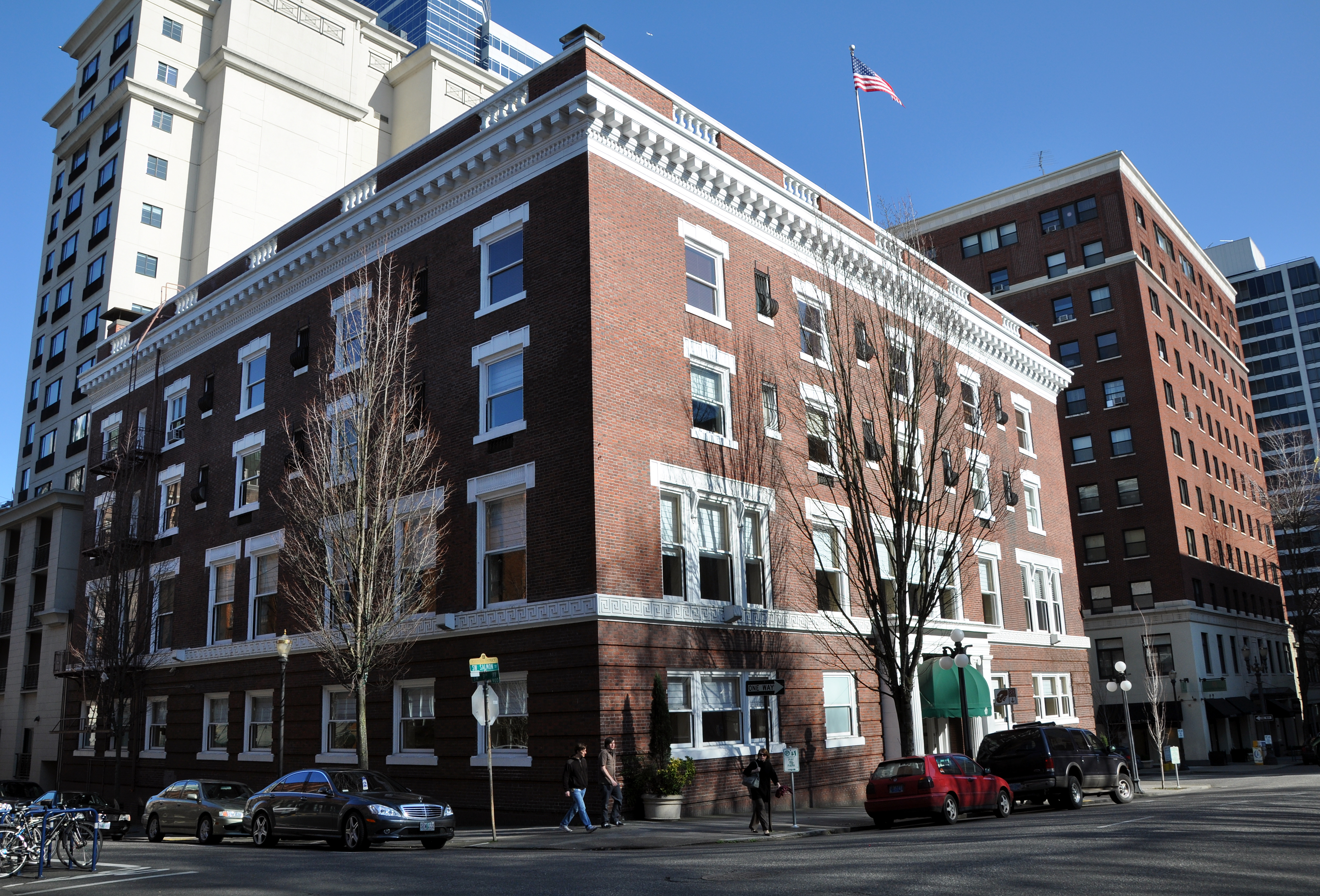
- The Arlington Club in 2010

- Location within Portland, Oregon
- Location: 811 SW Salmon Street; Portland, Oregon
- Coordinates: 45°31′04″N 122°40′55″W
- Built: 1909
- Architect: Whidden & Lewis
- Architectural style: Georgian Revival
- MPS: Historic Resources in Downtown Portland, Oregon, MPS
- NRHP reference No.: 10000599
- Added to NRHP: August 30, 2010

The Arlington Club is a private social club organized in 1867 by 35 business and banking leaders of Portland, Oregon. It is organized as a 501(c)(7) First called the Social Club and later renamed the Arlington Club, it offered its all-male, largely white membership consisting of banking and business leadership.

During its first century, a total of more than 3,300 men were club members at one time or another. Many, in addition to pursuing their livelihoods, were officers in civic, cultural, philanthropic, or social organizations, and some held government posts at the local, state, or federal levels.

For about 100 years, the club excluded Jews and minorities regardless of other criteria, and for 123 years it excluded women. In response to public pressure, it broadened the membership criteria for men by the late 1960s and for women in 1990.

== History ==
In 1867, Simeon Reed and 34 other Portland men organized what they called the Social Club to "fraternize for mutual enjoyment and relaxation, and to provide a meeting place for discussing their own and Portland's destiny". The club, "the social headquarters of Portland's male elite" was dominated through the late 20th century by largely white, mostly Anglo-Saxon men from the city's business and banking leadership. Among the founders were John C. Ainsworth (Ainsworth National Bank), Henry Failing (merchandising, shipping, iron and steel, First National Bank), William S. Ladd (merchandising, transportation, flour milling, Ladd & Tilton Bank), Donald Macleay (merchandising, shipping, United States National Bank), George Weidler (steamships, real estate, lumber), and many others who made a lasting impact on the city. (Note: The Arlington Club's self-published history lists the founders' names, as recorded on the original written agreement establishing the club, as follows: Jno Green; T.A. Davis; M.A. King; W.K. (last name not identifiable); S.G. Reed; L.M. Starr; S.N. Arrigoni; Donald Macleay; Geo W. Weidler; C.H. Lewis; Henry Failing; John McCraken; Alex P. Ankeny; E.J. DeHart; Edwin Russell; R.R. Thompson; Al Zieber; A.B. Richardson; J.A. Chapman; S.B. Parrish; W.W. Page; Charles E. Calef; E. Milwain; Richard B. Knapp; H.C. Leonard; Ladd & Tilton; J.M. Crawford; J.C. Ainsworth; L.C. Fuller; H.D. Green; James W. Barker; T.J. Carter; A.M. Loryea; Samuel M. Smith, and J. Myrick.)

Paul G. Merriam describes the city's early social elite, including the members of the Social Club, as "primarily businessmen and their close associates, such as lawyers and editors". The social elite were heads of families who "held property valued at $50,000 or more, and who were officers in one or more civic, cultural, philanthropic, or social organizations." Merriam counts 38 such men in Portland in 1870, 31 of whom at one time or another held local government office and several of whom held state and federal offices. Most were nominal Republicans; some were Democrats, but they crossed party lines depending on issues and personalities.

Although one of the club's goals was to pattern itself after gentlemen's clubs of Europe and older American cities, it also had "civic interests at heart and civic leaders as members...". However, according to Portland historian E. Kimbark MacColl, club members at times equated self-interest with civic interest:

In the 1890s at least, what was good for "them" was usually considered good for "the city". Rarely did the members distinguish between the public interest and their own private interests if actions and words have been reported accurately. It would appear that many of the major decisions affecting Portland's business and political life were actually reached during "informal" discussions held within the club's portals.

Big banks, utilities, railroads, and U.S. Senators from Oregon were well represented within the membership. Generally in the 1890s four or five club members were part of the Oregon Legislature. Three other clubs—the Multnomah Amateur Athletic Club (1891), the Waverly Golf Club (1896), and the University Club (1896)—formed during the 1890s, and memberships often overlapped with the Arlington Club. The Concordia Club, formed in 1878, was the Jewish version of the Arlington Club, which was at the time not open to Jews.

Among the club's self-generated list of notable members between 1867 and 1967 were George H. Williams, appointed Chief Justice of the Territorial Courts of Oregon in 1853, elected to the U.S. Senate in 1864, named United States Attorney General in 1871, and elected mayor of Portland in 1892. Another was Frederick Van Voorhies Holman, general counsel for an electric utility in the early 20th century, patron of the arts, and author of a biography of John McLoughlin. Journalist Harvey W. Scott, a mid-19th-century editor of The Oregonian and author of a six-volume history of Oregon, is on the list as is Lewis A. McArthur, a 20th-century electric utility executive and author of Oregon Geographic Names. University presidents, a bishop, and an Air Force general are among others on the list. Well-known guests of the club have included U.S. presidents William Howard Taft, Rutherford B. Hayes, and Ulysses S. Grant, author Aldous Huxley, heart surgeon Michael E. DeBakey, General George C. Marshall, bridge designer Ralph Modjeski, and many others.

== Meeting places, buildings ==
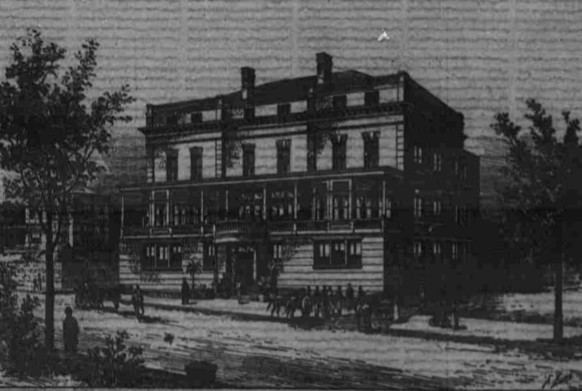
A lithograph of the Arlington Club (West Park and Alder) from the first page of the April 4, 1891 edition of The Illustrated Western Shore

For its first 14 years, the club members met in dining places, hotels, government chambers, or "any place available". When the club reorganized and renamed itself the Arlington Club in 1881, it had grown to a membership of about 100. At that time, it moved into its first clubhouse, the former J.C. Ainsworth residence at Southwest Third Avenue at Pine Street, which became available when the Ainsworths moved to California. It built its second clubhouse, at West Park Avenue and Alder Street, which it occupied from 1892 to 1910 until moving to the building the club still occupies, on Southwest Salmon Street facing the South Park Blocks. Architects for the latter structure, a four-story, low-rise building of brick and terra cotta in a neo-classical style, were William M. Whidden and Ion Lewis. The Park Blocks just south of the clubhouse are flanked by churches, the Portland Art Museum, the Oregon Historical Society Museum, and Portland State University, as well as other buildings forming part of the city's core. The building was nominated to become a National Register of Historic Places building in April 2010, and was listed on the registry in August of that year.

== Membership changes ==
From the beginning, only business and community leaders were invited to join the club, a total of 3,300 of them during the club's first century, but other exclusions applied as well. Jews and ethnic minorities were kept out of the Arlington Club until the late 1960s after Portland's Jewish leaders including Gus Solomon, a federal judge, criticized the exclusion rules. Change occurred slowly; The Oregonian newspaper reported that in 1989 Jews and ethnic minorities made up less than 3 percent of the Arlington Club membership and that the membership included no African Americans.

In October 1989, citing a federal law banning discrimination on the basis of gender, the Portland City Council, led by Commissioner Earl Blumenauer, passed a unanimous resolution urging the Arlington Club and the University Club, another men-only club, to admit women. (Note: In October 1989, the University Club, which also met in downtown Portland, had about 40 women among its 900 members. However, the women had no voting rights, paid lower dues, and were not allowed to enter the men's grill during lunch. Later in 1989, the club voted to allow women as full members.) At the time, the Arlington Club had about 500 members and did not normally allow women inside its building. (Note: During the club's first century, there were at least three formal exceptions to the general rule. Women were admitted to a reception in 1892 for the club's new building on West Park Avenue and Alder Street; they were admitted to a dinner and reception in 1910 for the club's second new building, and they were received in 1967 to celebrate the club centennial.) During the City Council meeting, five women, representing the Multnomah Bar Association, the Commercial Club of Portland, the Association of Black Lawyers, Oregon Women Lawyers, and the American Civil Liberties Union, testified that the clubs' discrimination barred them from business opportunities afforded to men. Representing the Oregon Eagle Forum, a woman, the only person testifying against the resolution, cited a constitutional right to assemble without government intrusion.

In March 1990, the Arlington Club members voted 320 to 145 to allow women to join the club; 5 members abstained, and others of the 525 members did not vote. Since the ratio of "yes" to "no" votes was 68.8 percent, slightly more than the two-thirds supermajority required to change the club's rules, women, after 123 years of exclusion, were thereafter admitted. The club building was subsequently remodeled to add women's restrooms and a lounge, and women were officially allowed on February 11, 1991. As of 2026, the Arlington Club still meets at its building on Southwest Salmon Street in downtown Portland.

On November 30, 2015, the president at the time John Bradley, the CEO of R&H Construction at the time resigned from presidency as well as surrendering his Arlington Club membership soon after the publication of his arrest for domestic violence. Bradley was convicted on his domestic violence charges on December 2, 2015.

== See also ==
- List of American gentlemen's clubs

== Sources ==
- MacColl, E. Kimbark (1979). The Growth of a City: Power and Politics in Portland, Oregon, 1915 to 1950. Portland, Oregon: The Georgian Press. ISBN 0-9603408-1-5.
- MacColl, E. Kimbark; Stein, Harry H. (1988). Merchants, Money, and Power: The Portland Establishment 1843–1913. Portland, Oregon: The Georgian Press. ISBN 0-9603408-4-X.
- MacColl, E. Kimbark. (1976). The Shaping of a City: Business and Politics in Portland, Oregon, 1885 to 1915. Portland, Oregon: The Georgian Press. OCLC 2645815
- Merriam, Paul G. "Urban Elite in the Far West: Portland, Oregon, 1870–1890". Arizona and the West 18.1 (Spring 1976): pp. 41–52.
- Montgomery, Richard G., et al. (1983) [1968]. Arlington Club and the Men Who Built It: Centennial Anniversary, updated edition. Portland, Oregon: The Arlington Club. OCLC 31073417.
