= Portland Hotel =

Former hotel in Portland, Oregon, U.S.

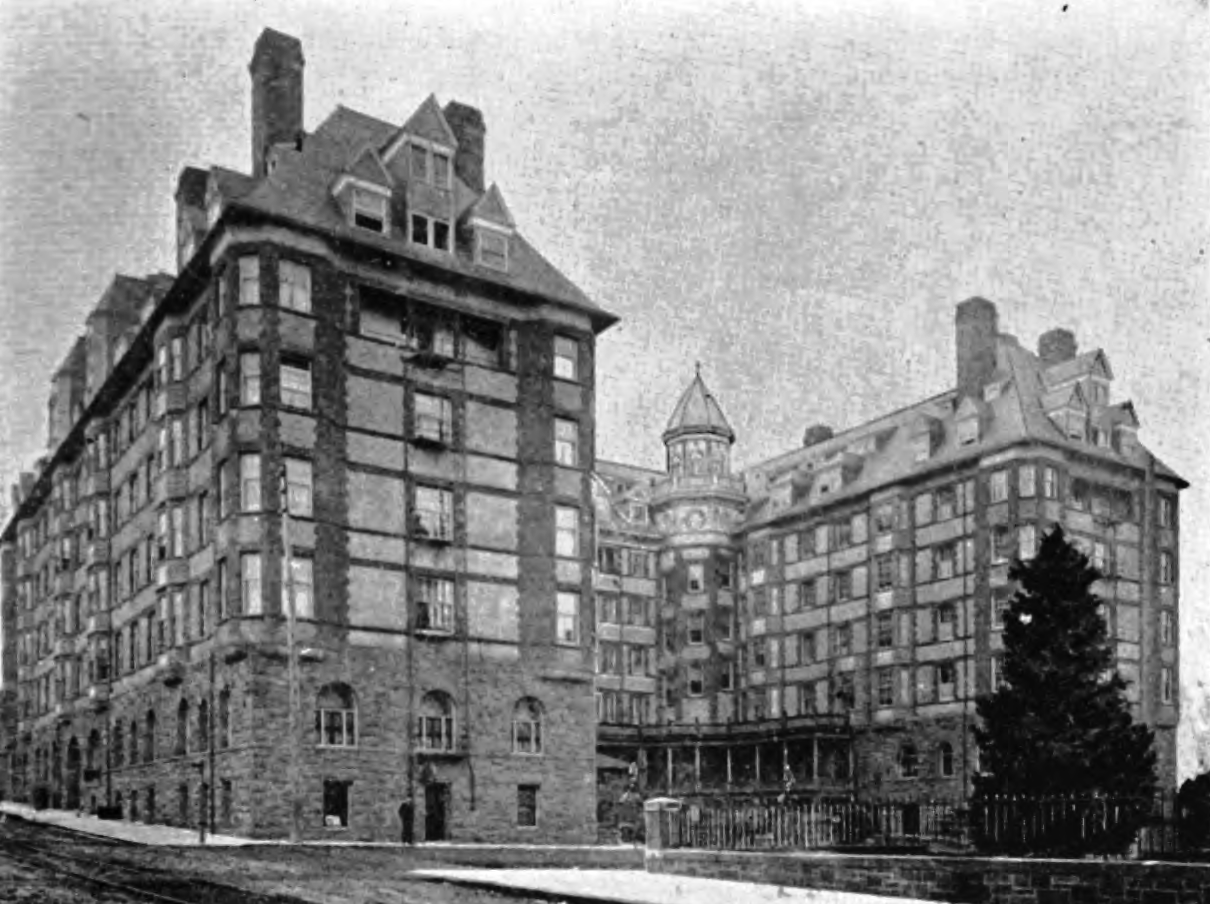
- The hotel about 1900. The tall chimneys on the roof were shortened/removed in the 1910s, as can be seen in the 1919 image below.
- Interactive map of the Portland Hotel area

General information
- Type: Hotel
- Location: Portland, Oregon, United States
- Coordinates: 45.518872°N 122.6793°W
- Construction started: 1882
- Opened: 1890
- Demolished: 1951
- Cost: $1,000,000

Height
- Architectural: Queen Anne, Châteauesque

Technical details
- Floor count: 8

Design and construction
- Architect: William M. Whidden
- Architecture firm: Whidden & Lewis

Other information
- Number of rooms: 326

The Portland Hotel (or Hotel Portland) was a late-19th-century hotel in Portland, Oregon, United States, that once occupied the city block on which Pioneer Courthouse Square now stands. It closed in 1951 after 61 years of operation.

== History ==
The building was designed by William M. Whidden, later of the prominent Portland architectural firm Whidden & Lewis, and Charles Follen McKim of McKim, Mead, & White. The site was previously occupied by the Central School Building. To make way for the hotel, the school building was purchased by Philip A. Marquam, one of the hotel project's financial backers, who relocated it one block north (to where the Selling Building now stands).

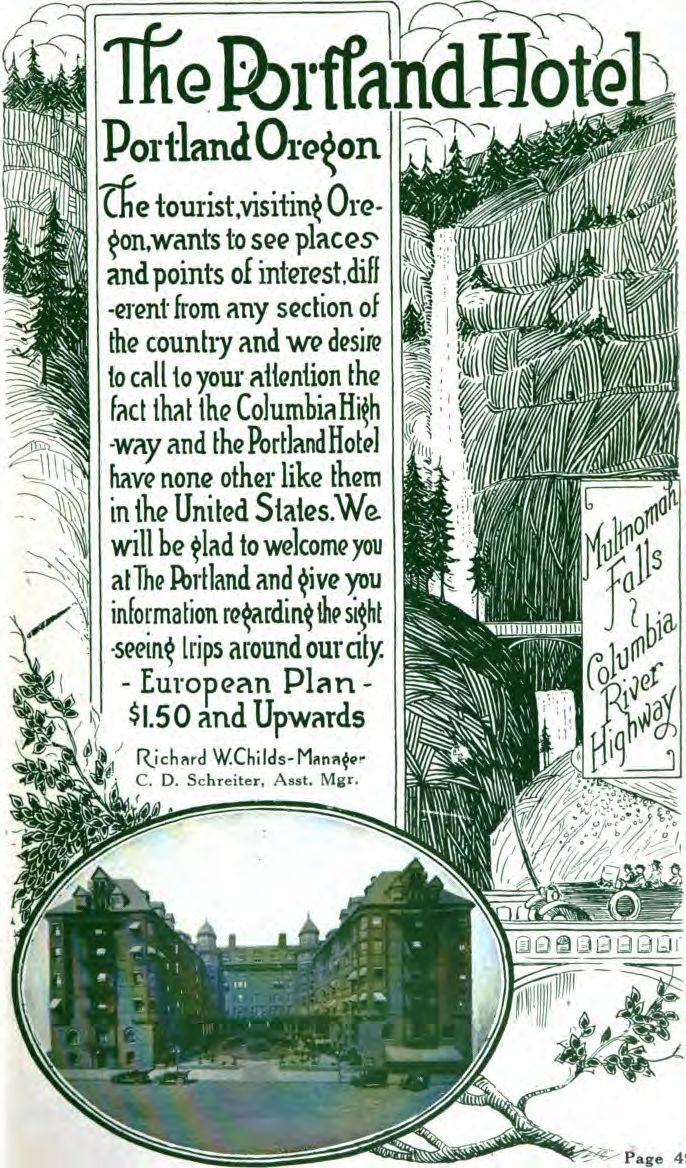
Advertising from 1919 with image of hotel

Railroad magnate Henry Villard financed the Portland Hotel and construction began in 1882, but his finances collapsed—in part because of the Panic of 1884—and the construction stopped for five years. With only the foundation completed, the site became known as "Villard's Ruins" and the bodies of two murder victims were found there before construction resumed. George B. Markle, Jr. began a campaign to raise local money to complete the hotel. He generated enough interest and subscribers to his plan, among them Henry W. Corbett, Henry Failing, Simeon Reed and William S. Ladd, to get construction started again. Later investors included labor leader Ed Boyce.

The Queen Anne, Châteauesque hotel finally opened in 1890 and had eight floors and 326 bedrooms. It had cost well over a million dollars and eight years to complete.

The Portland Hotel stood between Southwest Morrison and Yamhill, on 6th Street (now called 6th Avenue), facing the Pioneer Courthouse. Purchased in 1944 by Julius Meier and Aaron Frank, the deteriorating structure was demolished in 1951 and replaced by a parking structure for the Meier & Frank Building. The final day of operation was August 15, 1951. All of the hotel's furnishings and fixtures were disposed of at a public auction on August 28–29, 1951, the iron scrollwork gates being sold to Eric Ladd, a local contractor and historic preservationist (no relation to William Ladd).

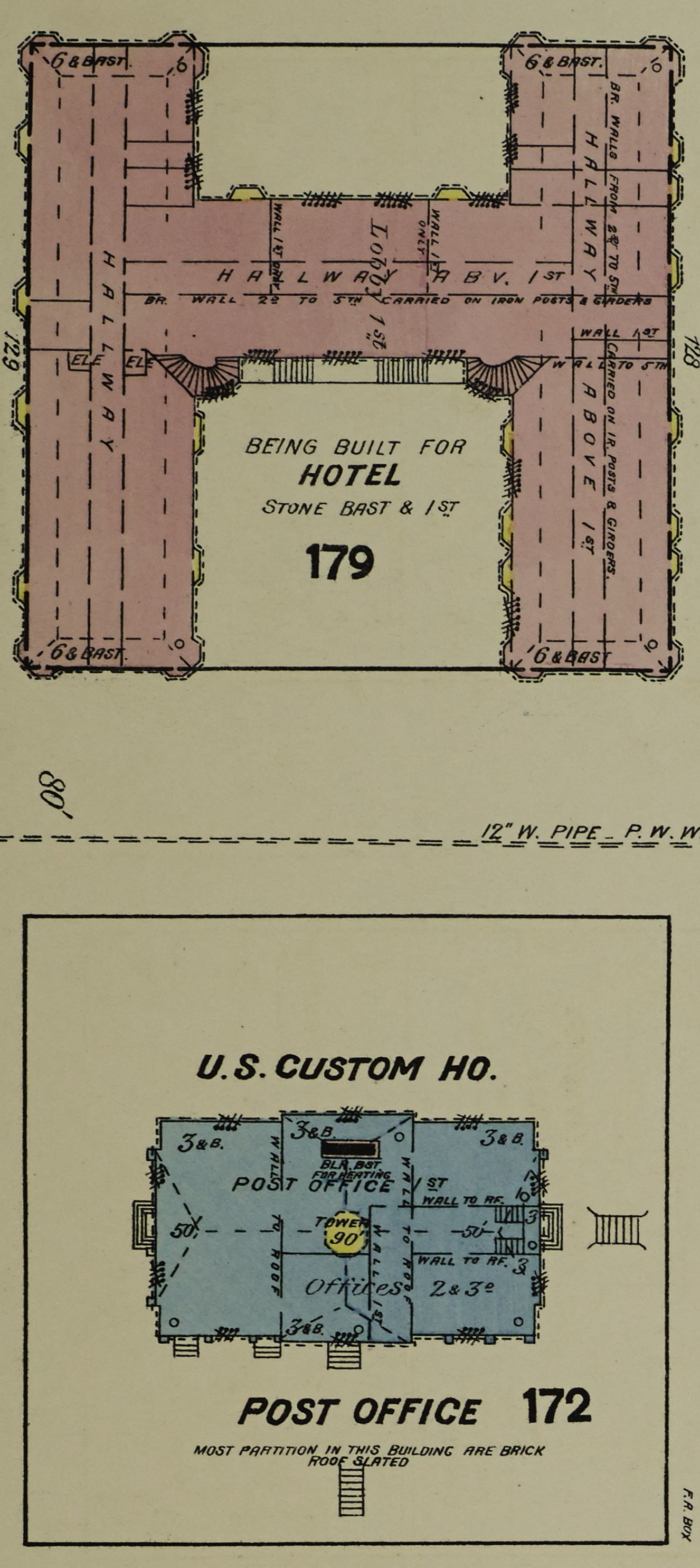
Portland Hotel during construction in 1889 opposite the Custom House and Post Office

When Pioneer Courthouse Square was built on the site in 1984, the iron scrollwork gate of the hotel was incorporated into the design. Much of the hotel's original stone foundation remains under the square's sidewalks.

Eleven U.S. presidents stayed at the Hotel Portland—each time, a new set of Haviland China was purchased for the occasion.

A. E. Doyle was approached about designing an addition to the hotel, but this never got past the planning stages.

== See also ==
- The Advocate (Portland, Oregon), a newspaper for Portland's African American community that involved staff from the hotel
