= Ayer–Shea House =

Historic building in Portland, Oregon, U.S.

- U.S. National Register of Historic Places
- U.S. Historic district – Contributing property
- Portland Historic Landmark
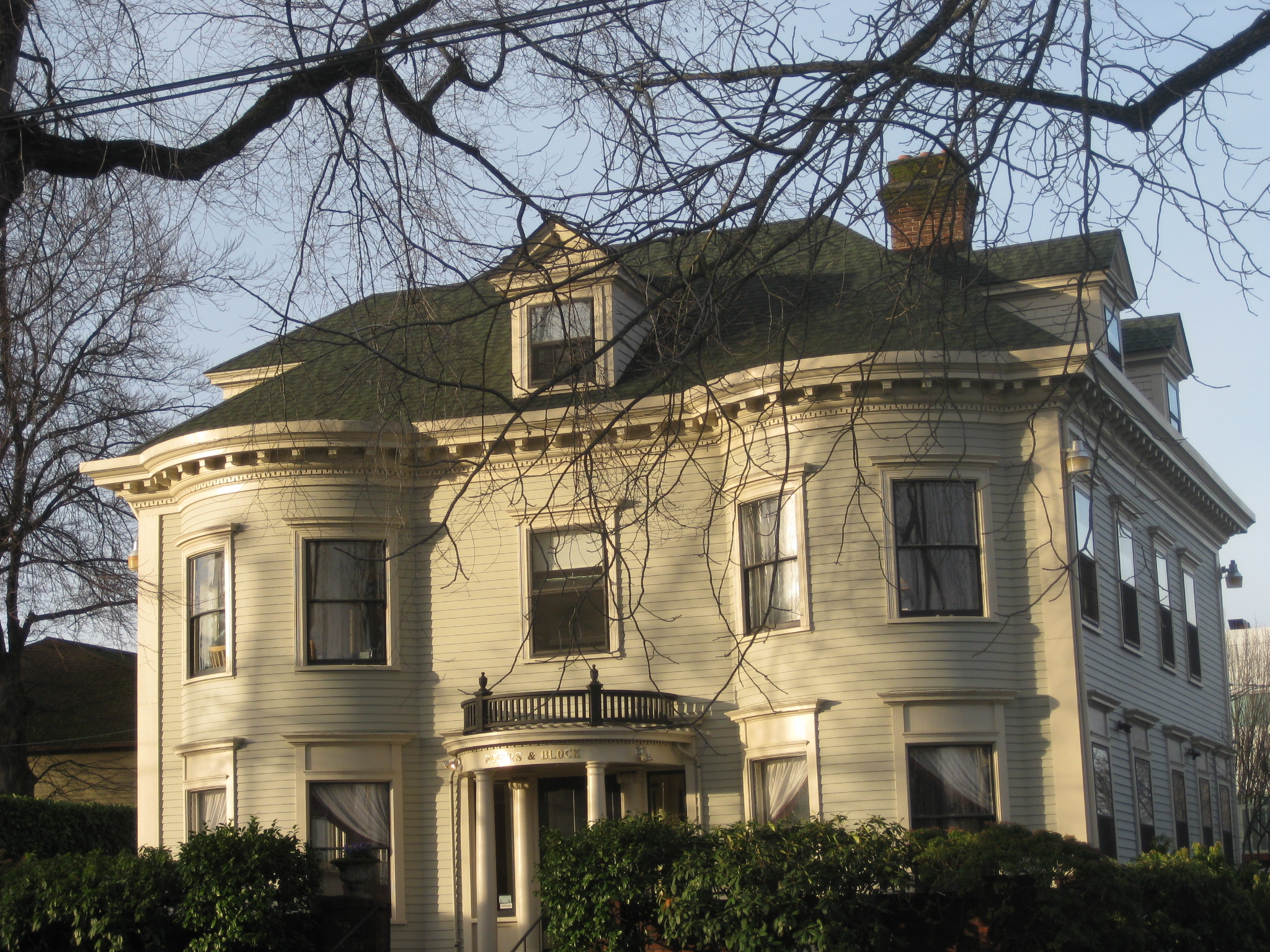

- Location within Portland, Oregon
- Location: 1809 NW Johnson Street; Portland, Oregon
- Coordinates: 45°31′44″N 122°41′23″W
- Built: 1892
- Architect: Whidden & Lewis
- Architectural style: Colonial Revival
- Part of: Alphabet Historic District (ID00001293)
- NRHP reference No.: 82003741
- Added to NRHP: June 14, 1982

The Ayer–Shea House is a house located in northwest Portland, Oregon listed on the National Register of Historic Places.

== See also ==
- National Register of Historic Places listings in Northwest Portland, Oregon
