= Philip Buehner House =

Historic building in Portland, Oregon, U.S.

- U.S. National Register of Historic Places
- Portland Historic Landmark
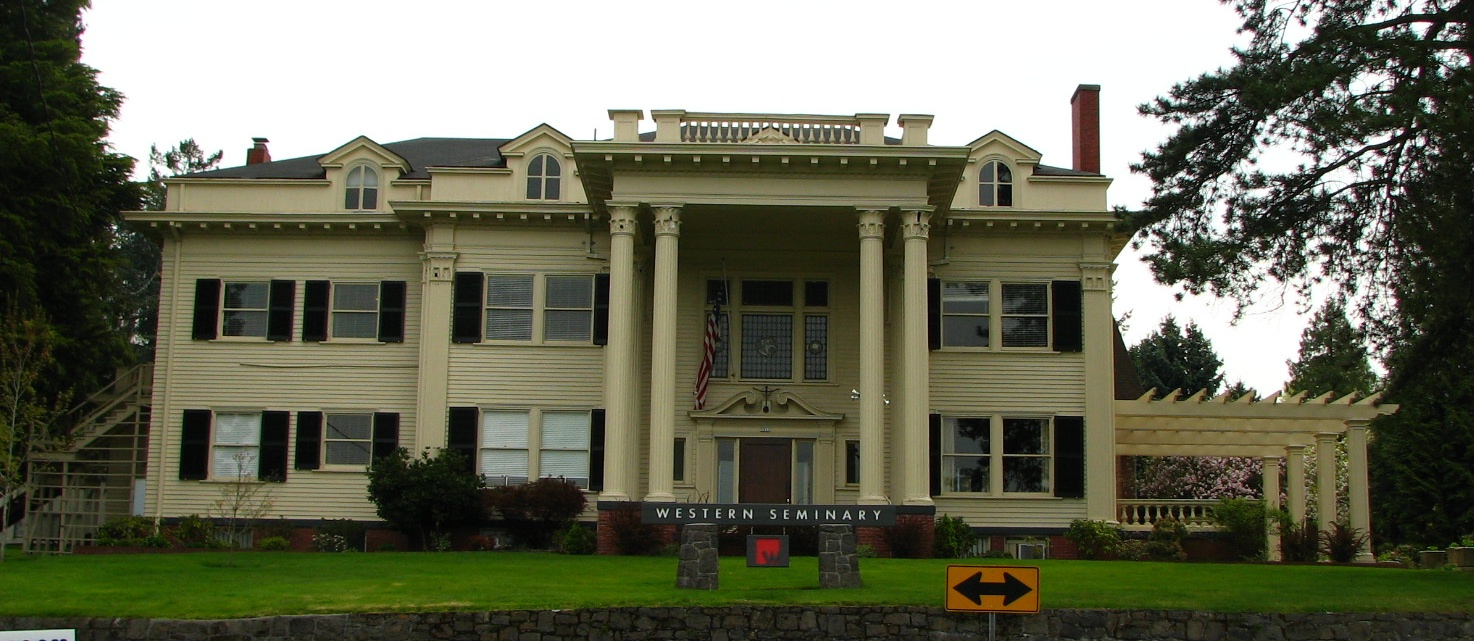
- The house's exterior in 2008

- Location within Portland, Oregon
- Location: 5511 SE Hawthorne Boulevard; Portland, Oregon
- Coordinates: 45°30′43″N 122°36′23″W
- Area: 0.6 acres (0.24 ha)
- Built: 1905
- Architect: Whidden & Lewis
- Architectural style: Colonial Revival
- NRHP reference No.: 80003359
- Added to NRHP: October 24, 1980

The Philip Buehner House is a house in southeast Portland, Oregon listed on the National Register of Historic Places. It is part of the Western Seminary Portland campus and is named Armstrong Hall.

== See also ==
- National Register of Historic Places listings in Southeast Portland, Oregon
