= Ion Lewis =

American architect (1858–1933)

- Born: March 26, 1858; Lynn, Massachusetts, United States
- Died: August 29, 1933 (aged 75); Portland, Oregon, United States
- Occupation: Architect

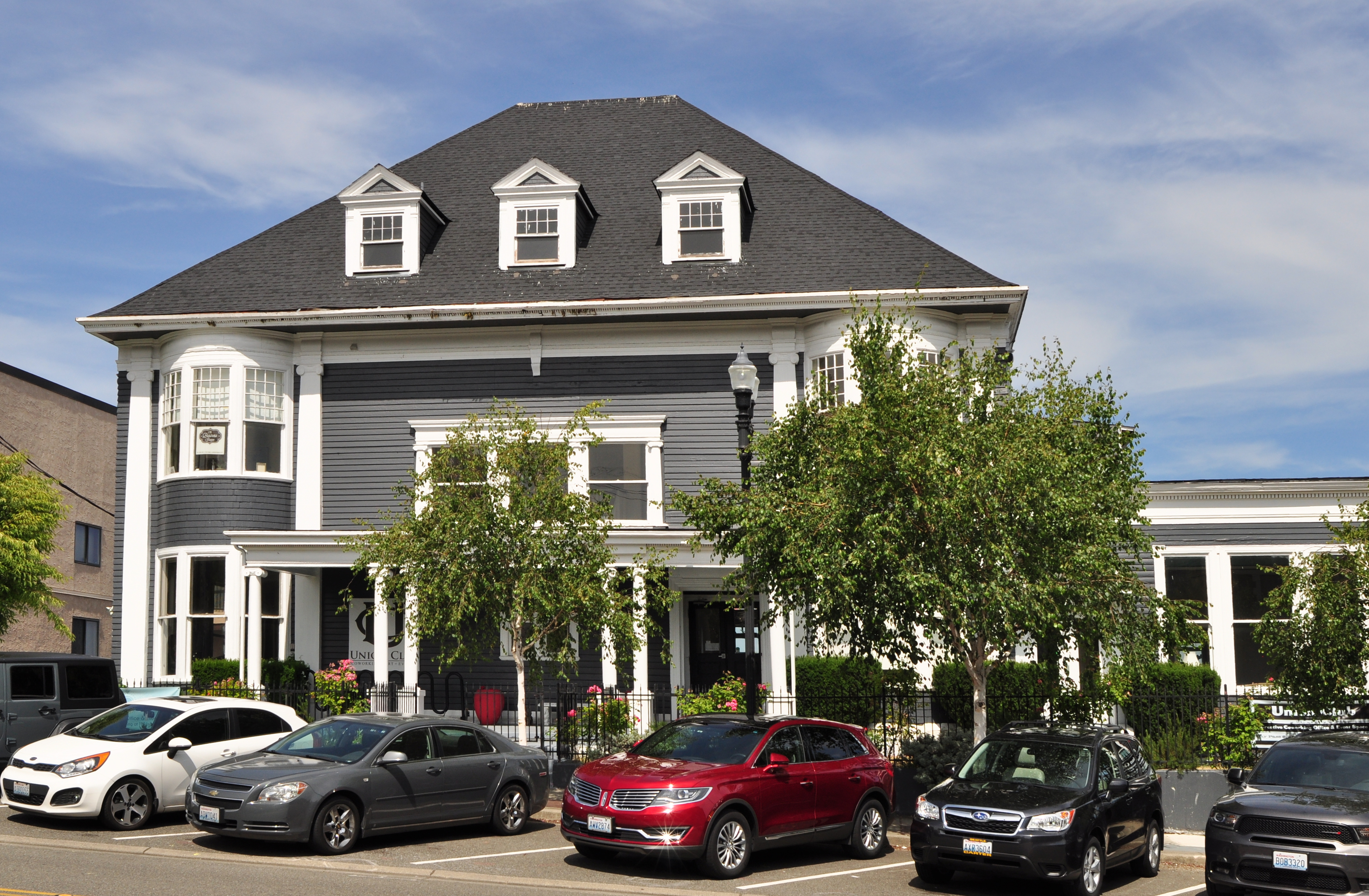
The Union Club (1890) in Tacoma, Washington, designed by Whidden & Lewis in the Colonial Revival style

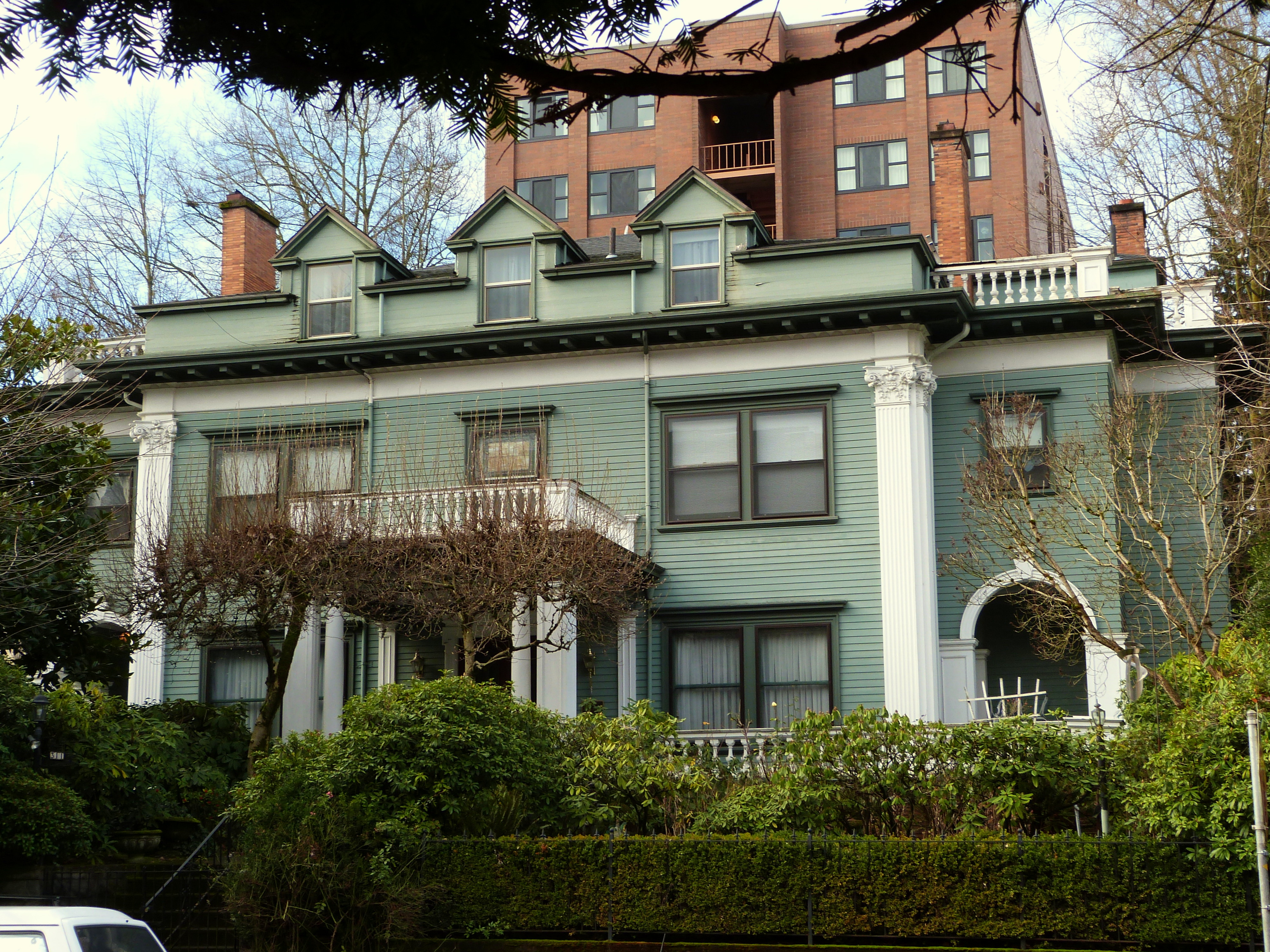
The Isam White House (1904) in Portland, designed by Whidden & Lewis in the Colonial Revival style

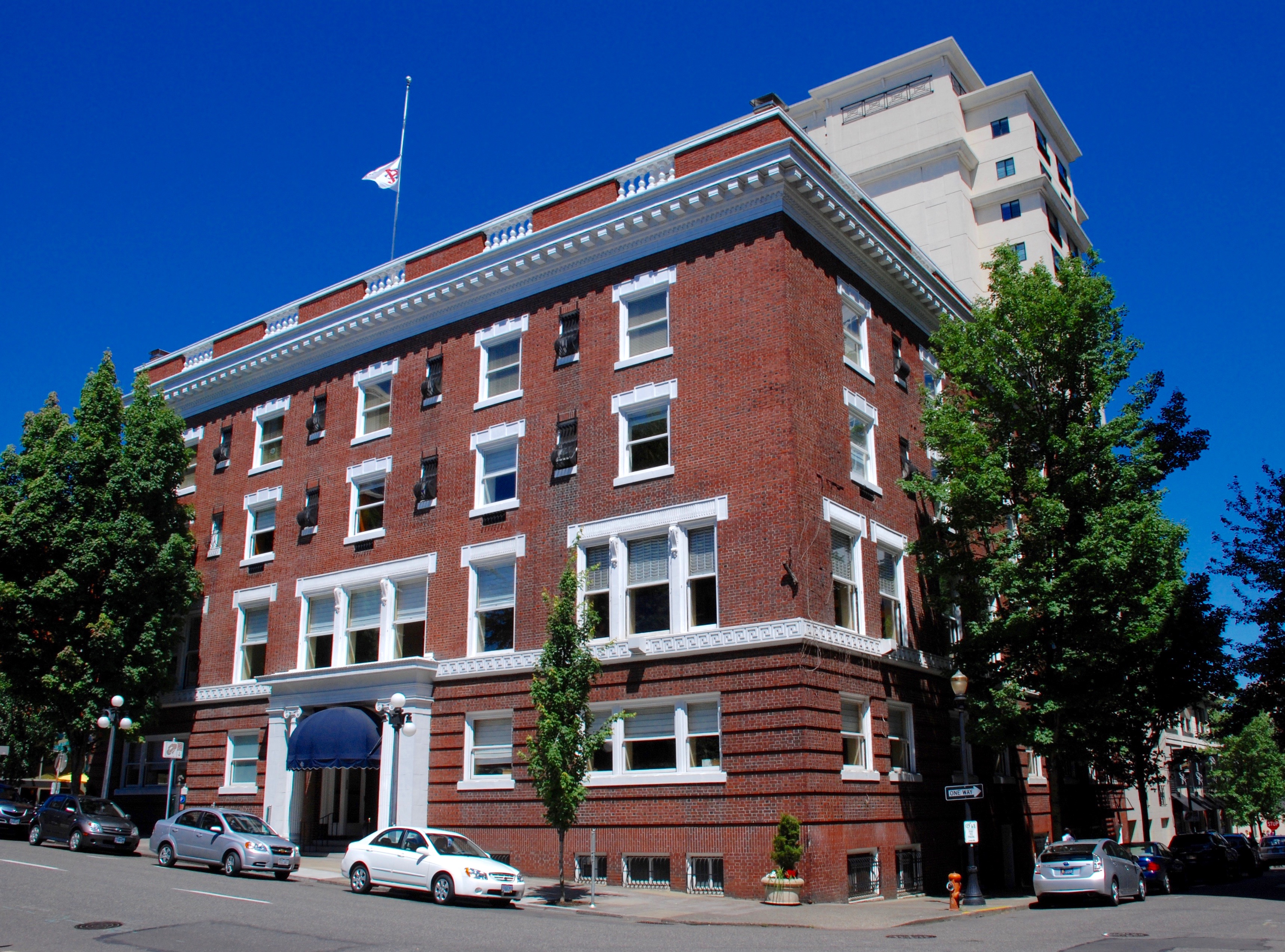
The Arlington Club (1910) in Portland, designed by Whidden & Lewis in the Colonial Revival style

Ion Lewis (March 26, 1858 – August 29, 1933) was an American architect. He began his career in Boston and is best remembered for his work in Portland, Oregon, where in 1889 he was founding member of Whidden & Lewis, a prominent local architectural firm.

== Early life and professional career ==
Ion Lewis was born March 26, 1858, in Lynn, Massachusetts, to Alonzo Lewis, a poet and historian, and Anna Ilsley Lewis, nee Hanson. From 1876 to 1877 he studied architecture as a special student at the Massachusetts Institute of Technology (MIT) with the class of 1878. He then worked for Peabody & Stearns until 1882, when he began practice in Boston in association with Henry Paston Clark. Their collaborative works included the Nanepashemet (1882, burned 1914), a massive Shingle Style hotel at Marblehead Neck. In the spring of 1884 he left Massachusetts for Chicago.

In 1889 Lewis traveled west to Portland, Oregon, where he visited William M. Whidden, an architect he had known in Boston. Whidden convinced him to settle in Portland and they formed the long-influential firm of Whidden & Lewis. According to Tom Whidden, son of William Whidden, Lewis was principally responsible for the firm's residential output, much of which reflects Lewis's eastern roots. The firm introduced the Colonial Revival style, then ascendant in the east, to Portland. In 1903 Lewis was appointed director of architecture for the upcoming Lewis and Clark Centennial Exposition. Lewis oversaw the design of all architectural work and his firm would directly design six of the fair's major buildings, which were to be designed in the Spanish Renaissance style. An exception to the rule was the firm's Forestry Building (1905, demolished), the so-called "Parthenon of Oregon." This, designed by employee A. E. Doyle under Lewis's supervision, was a highly original building in a rustic style but on a Neoclassical Beaux-Arts plan. The firm's relative position in the Portland architectural community declined after the fair and they completed no work of note after 1915.

== Personal life and death ==
In 1883 Lewis published a volume of his father's poetry under the title The Poetical Works of Alonzo Lewis.

Lewis was a lifelong bachelor. He was a Fellow of the American Institute of Architects (AIA) and a member and long-time resident of the Arlington Club; he was also architect of the Arlington Club's two buildings. He died August 29, 1933, at the club at the age of 75.
