= Whidden & Lewis =

American architectural firm

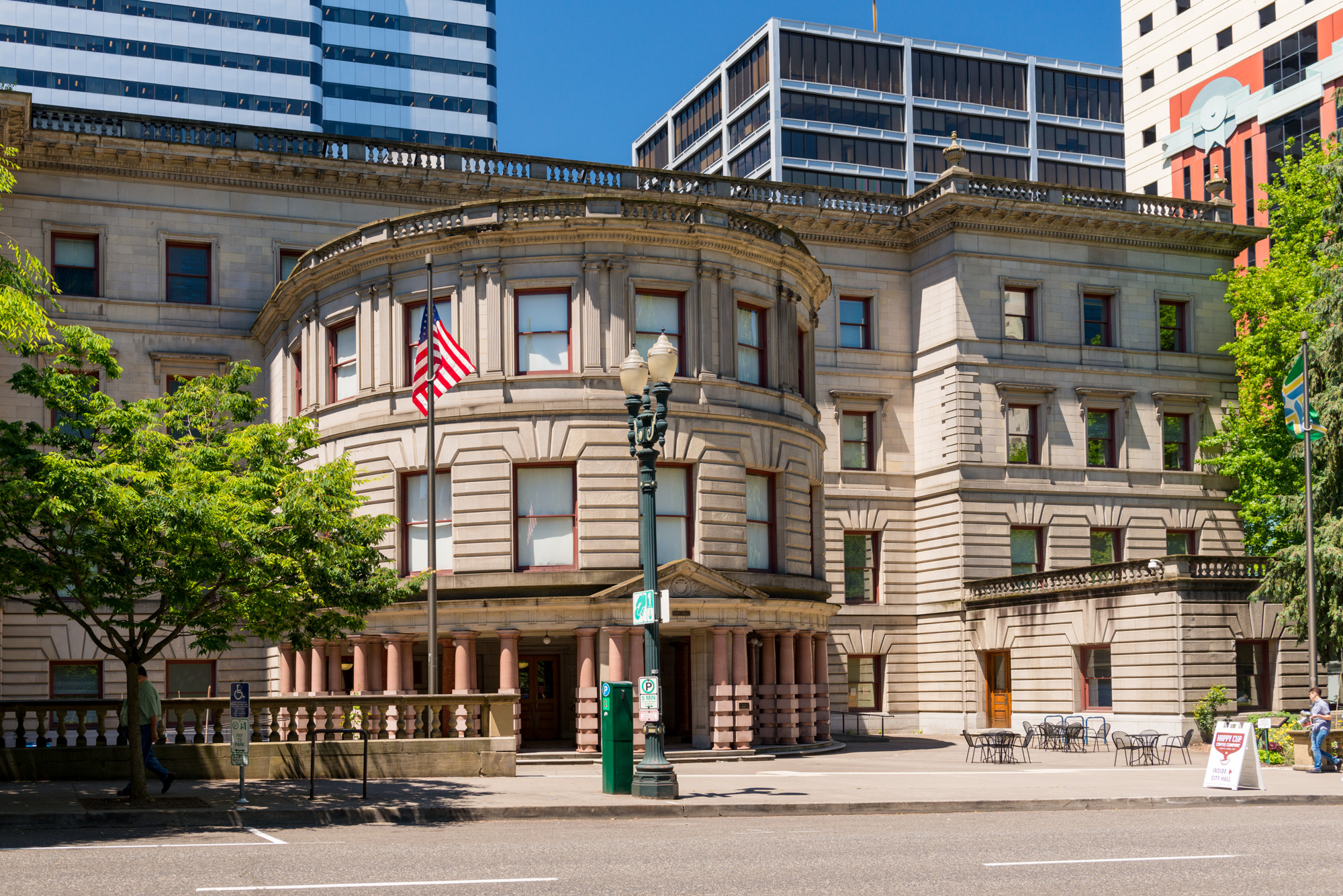
The Portland City Hall (1895), designed in the Renaissance Revival style

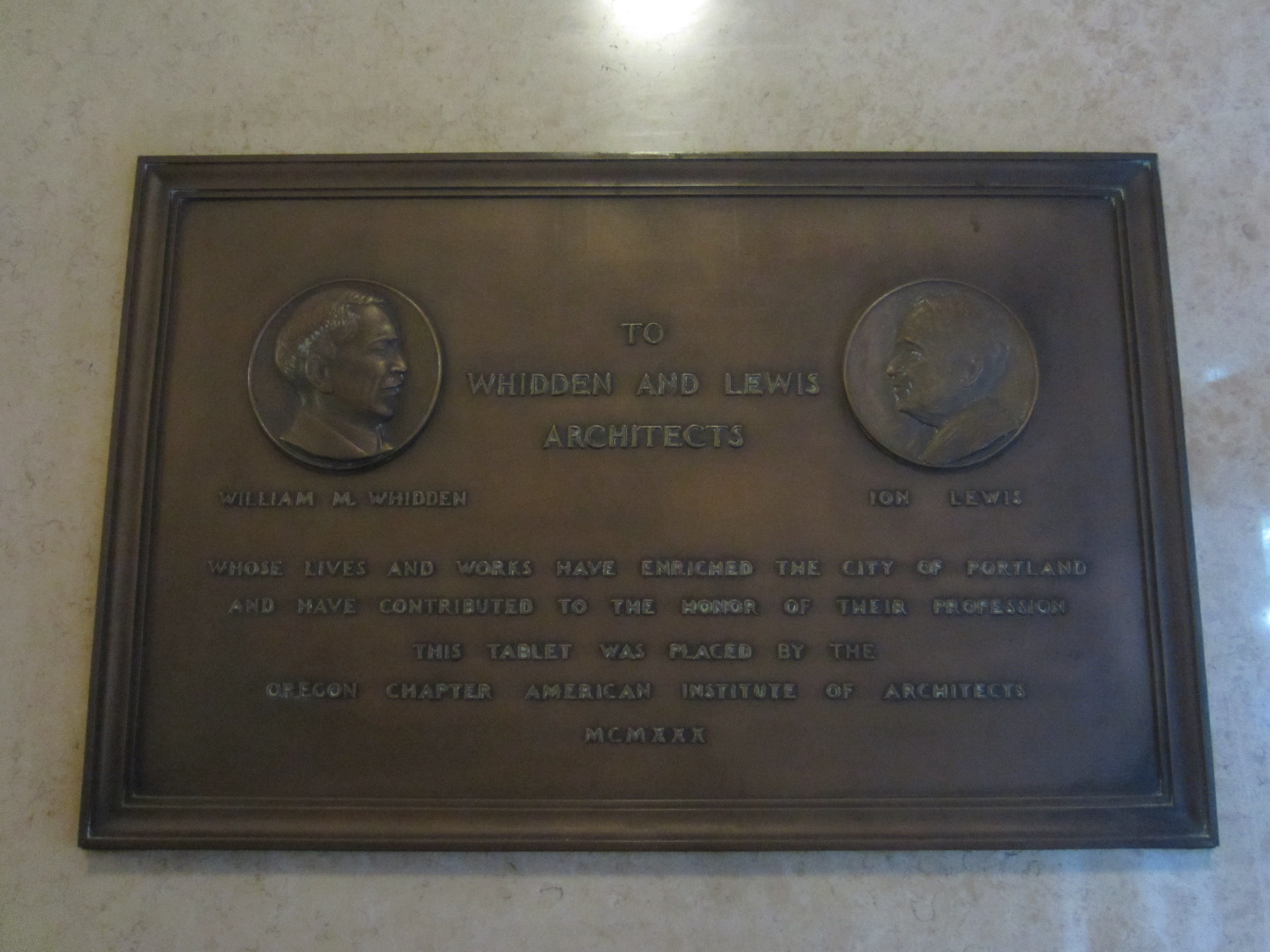
A plaque honoring the legacy of Whidden & Lewis was placed in City Hall in 1930

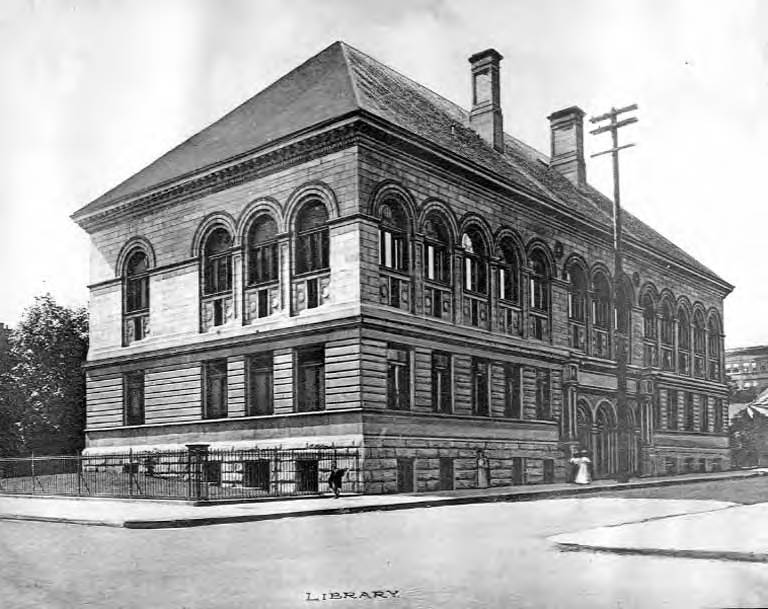
A period view of the former Portland Library (1893, demolished), designed in the Renaissance Revival style

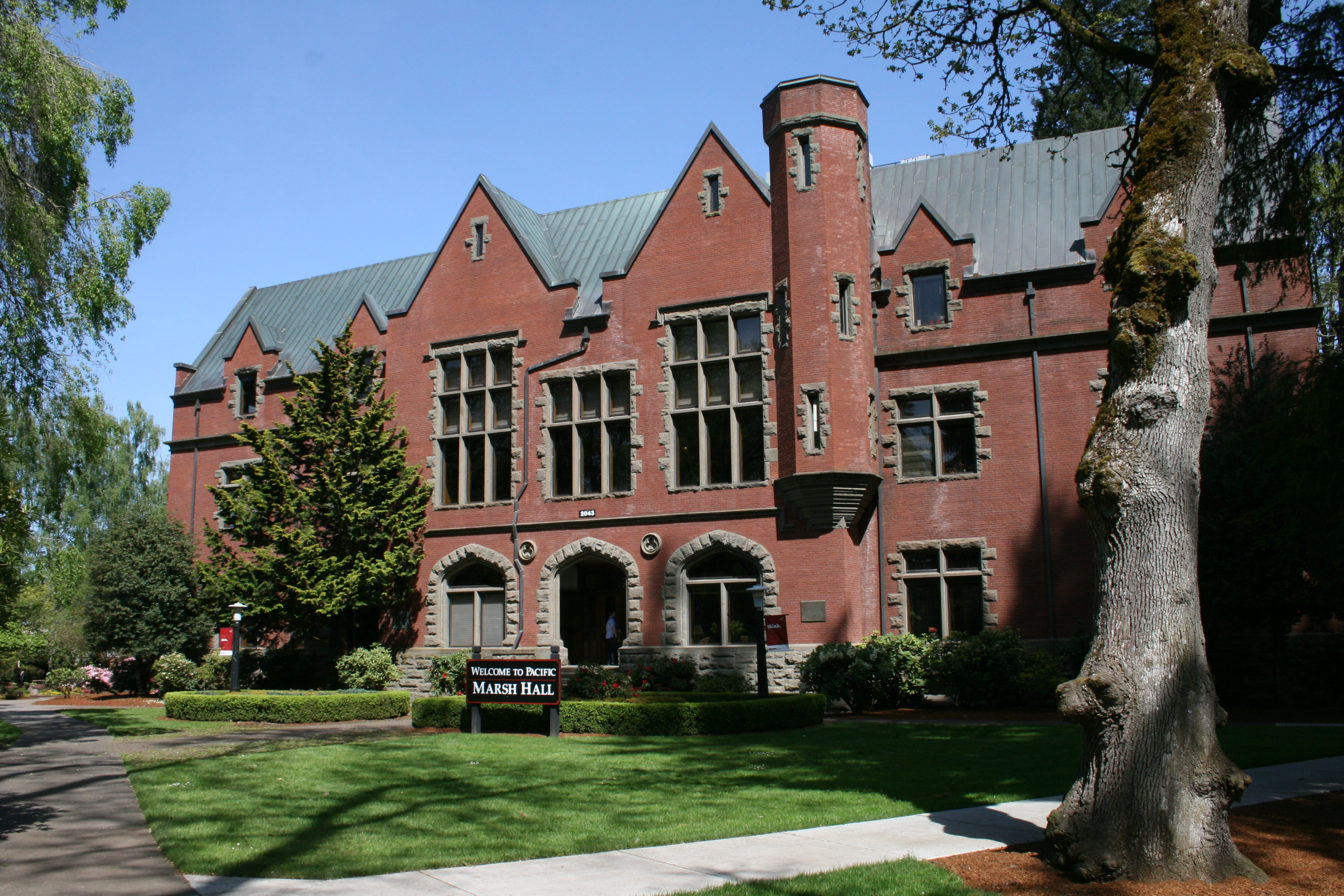
Marsh Hall (1895) of Pacific University, designed in the Collegiate Gothic style

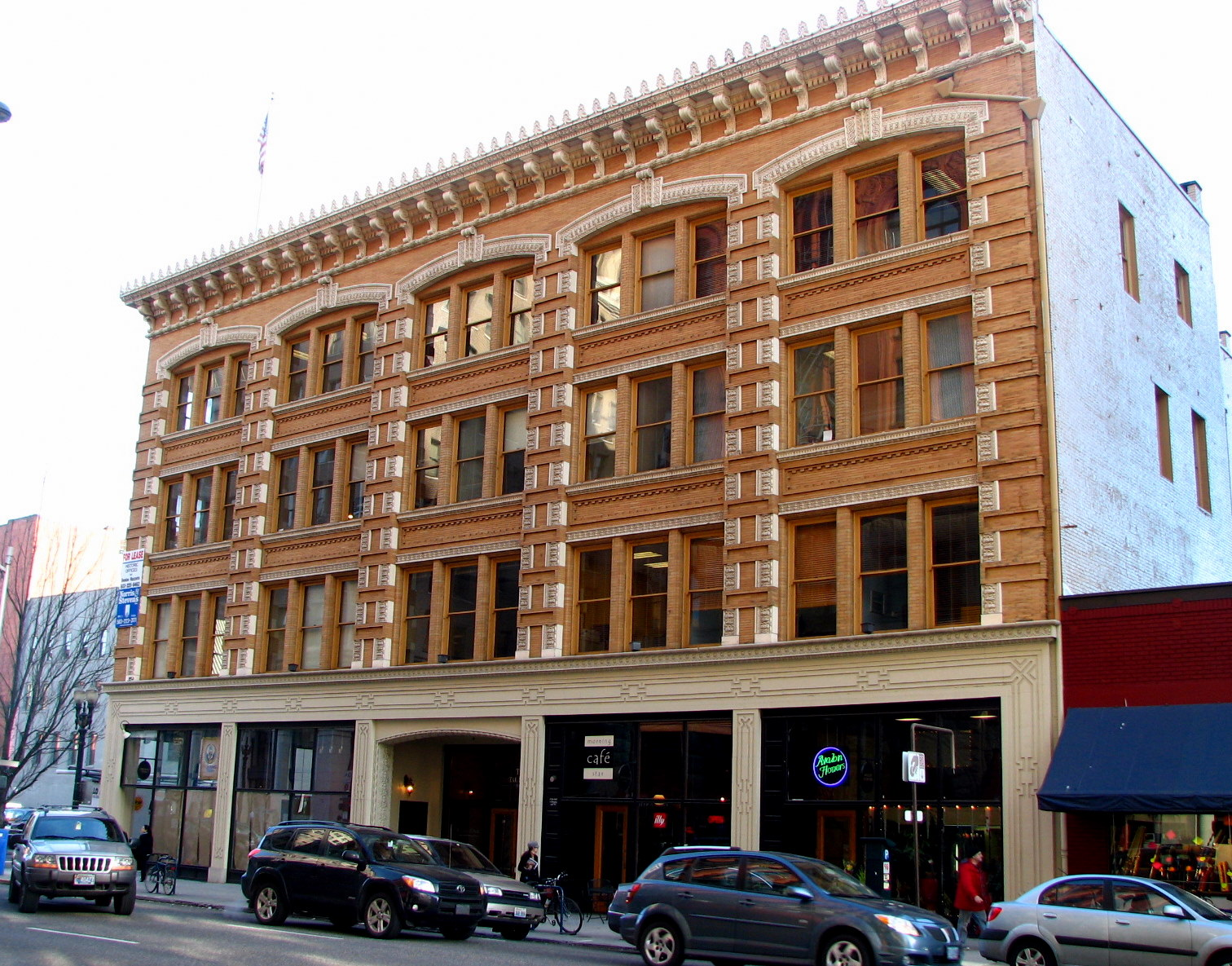
The Postal Building (1902) in Portland, designed in the Renaissance Revival style

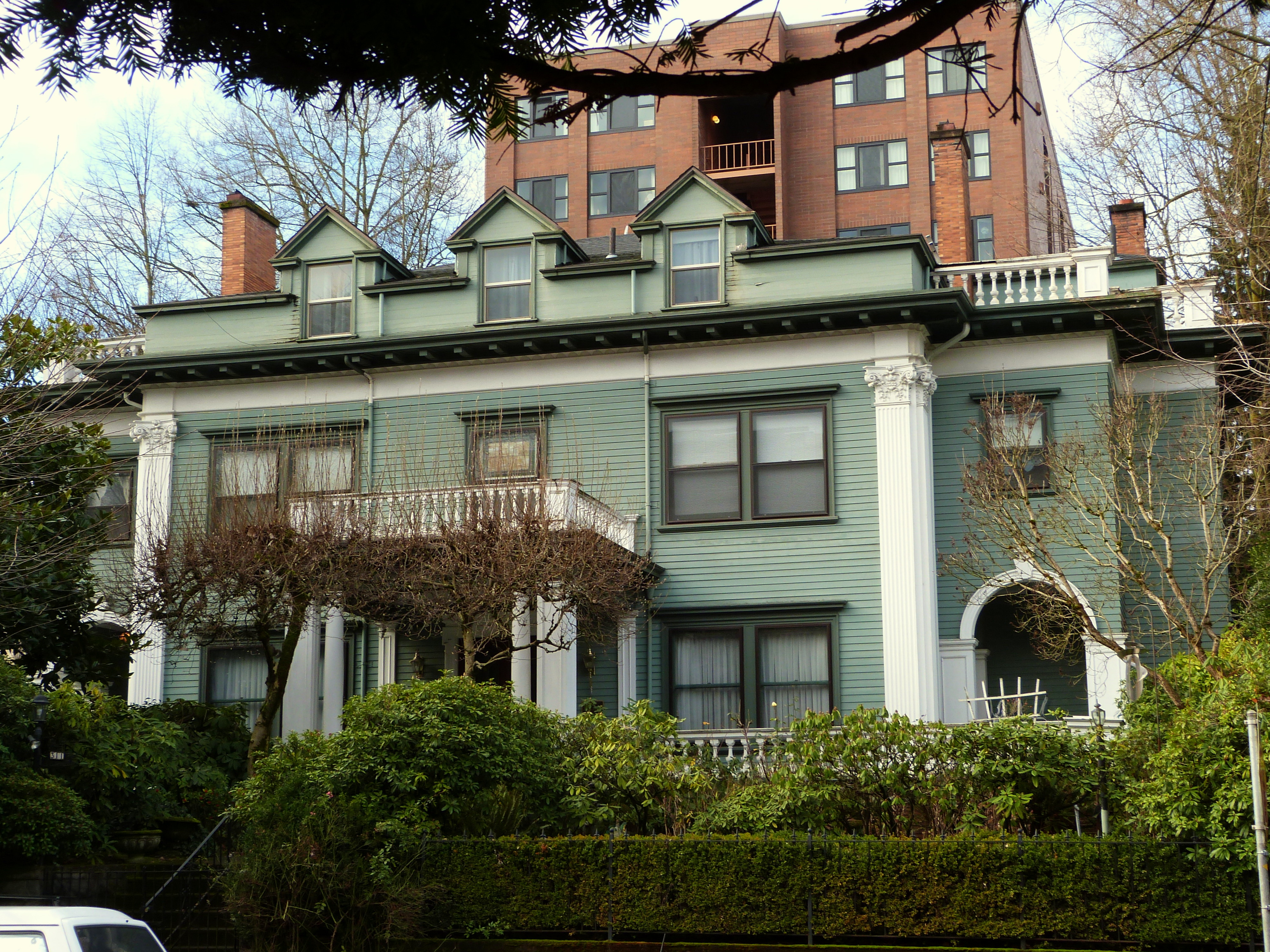
The Isam White House (1904) in Portland, designed in the Colonial Revival style

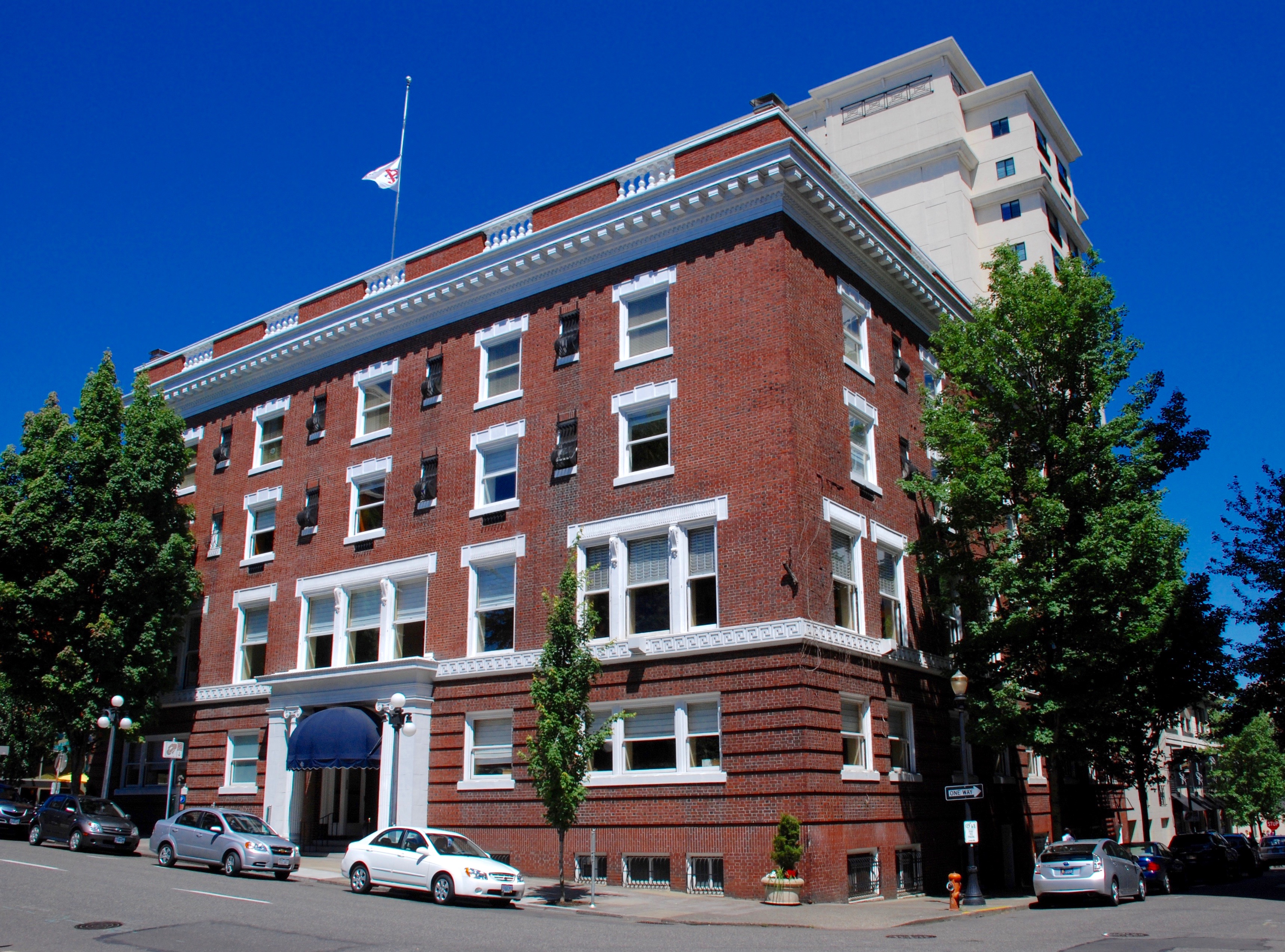
The Arlington Club (1910) in Portland, designed in the Colonial Revival style

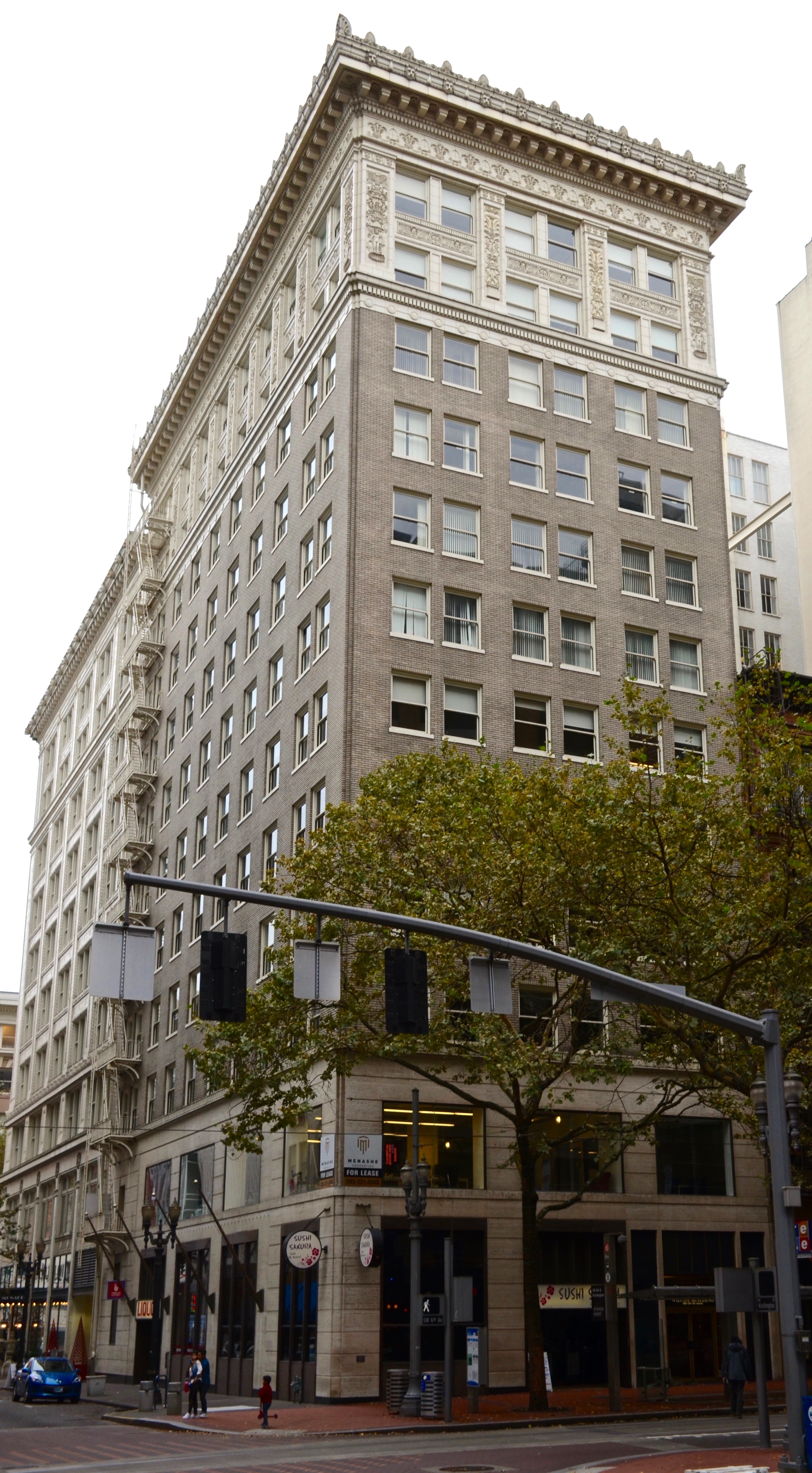
The Wilcox Building (1911) in Portland, designed in the Chicago style

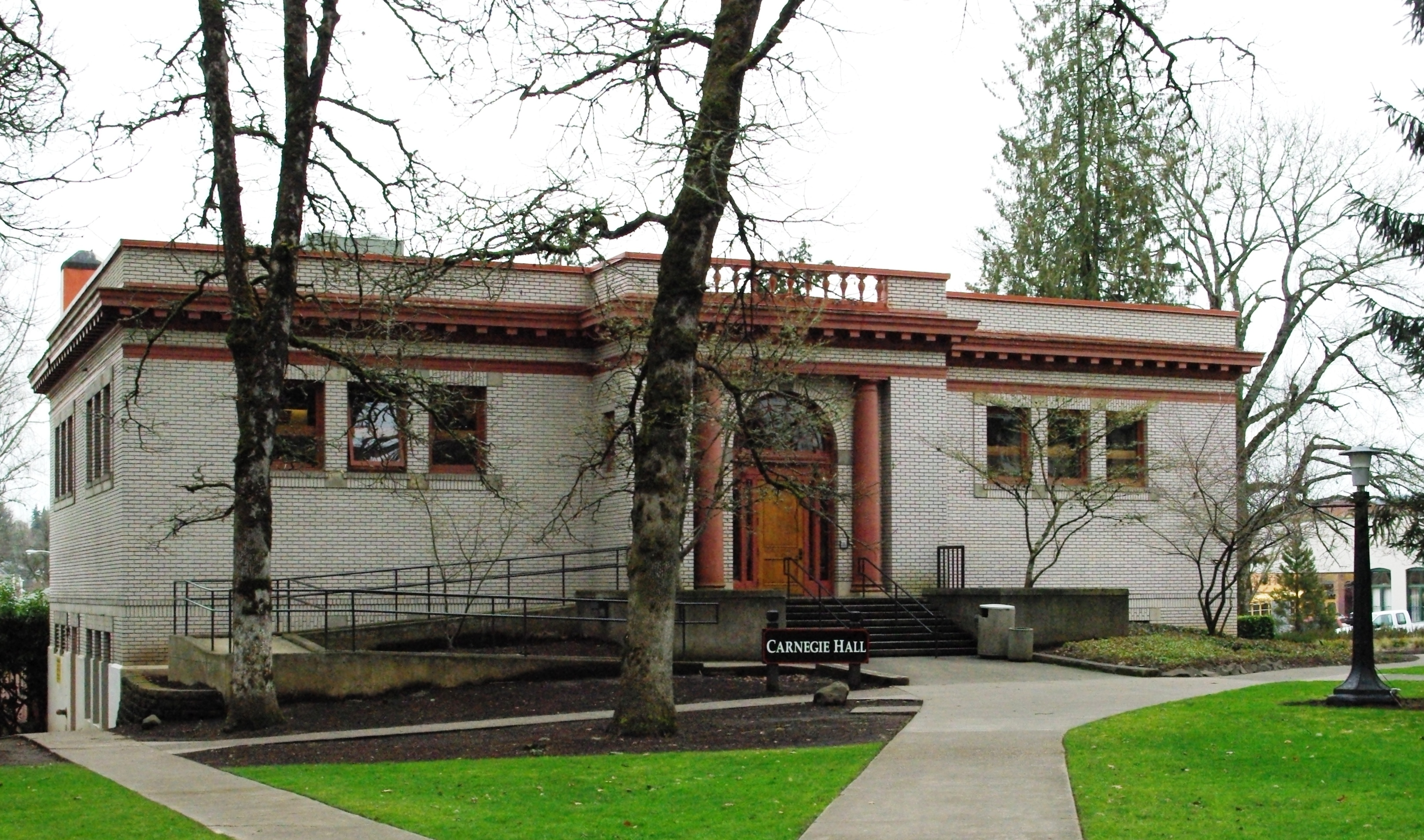
Carnegie Hall (1912) of Pacific University, designed in the Neoclassical style

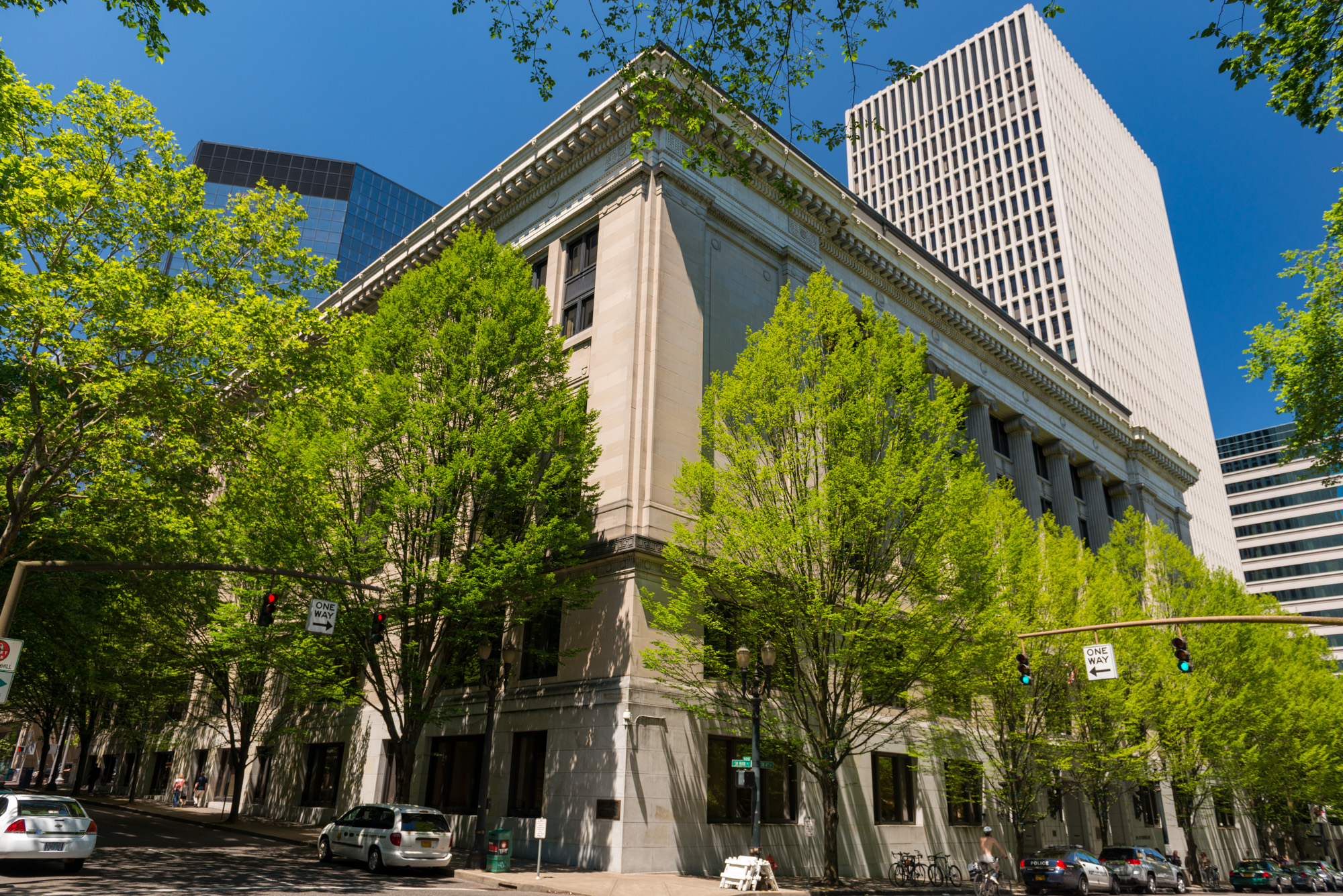
The former Multnomah County Courthouse (1914) in Portland, designed in the Neoclassical style

Whidden & Lewis was an American architectural firm based in Portland, Oregon. The partnership was established in 1889 by architects William M. Whidden and Ion Lewis and was Portland's leading architectural firm into the first decade of the twentieth century.

== History ==
The partnership of Whidden & Lewis was formed in Portland in 1889 by architects William M. Whidden (1857-1929) and Ion Lewis (1858-1933). Both were natives of Massachusetts, had been educated at the Massachusetts Institute of Technology and had trained under leading eastern architects such as McKim, Mead & White and Peabody & Stearns. Whidden had the additional benefit of three years of study at the influential École des Beaux-Arts in Paris. Whidden had first come to Portland early in the 1880s with his employer, McKim, to work on the Portland Hotel and returned in 1888 when that project was revived. Portland architect and author Richard Marlitt wrote that Whidden & Lewis was the first modern architectural office in Portland. The city had never before seen architects with their education and "polished ability." They introduced contemporary architectural developments, such as Beaux-Arts principles of design and the Colonial Revival style, to Portland and Oregon. Their reputation was established with works such as the Portland Library (1893, demolished) and the Portland City Hall (1895) and they would dominate local architectural practice for the next decade. With a series of office buildings, beginning with the Concord Building (1891) and Hamilton Building (1893), they also introduced the most contemporary ideas in tall buildings.

In 1903 their reputation was such that Ion Lewis was appointed director of architecture for the upcoming Lewis and Clark Centennial Exposition (1905). Lewis oversaw the design of all architectural work and his firm would directly design six of the fair's major buildings, which were to be designed in the Spanish Renaissance style. An exception to the rule was the firm's Forestry Building (1905, demolished), the so-called "Parthenon of Oregon." This, designed by employee A. E. Doyle under Lewis's supervision, was a highly original building in a rustic style but on a Neoclassical Beaux-Arts plan.

The fair prompted an economic boom in Portland and Oregon. New architects were needed to design the vast number of new buildings being proposed and built. Whidden & Lewis's position as leaders of the Portland architectural profession was soon taken by their long-time employee, Doyle, whose firm was to develop the talents of Pietro Belluschi. His position was secured in 1911, when his firm was awarded the job to plan the campus and buildings of the recently-founded Reed College. The specific cause of Whidden & Lewis's decline in status is not known. Doyle's biographer, Philip Niles, has argued that while their eastern sophistication was a novelty at first, it was not always an asset and became a liability as the city and its architectural community developed. Whidden in particular was seen as cold and aloof by his professional contemporaries. In 1909, when local architects established an atelier affiliated with the New York-based Beaux-Arts Institute of Design to train local draftsman in design, Whidden was approached to be its patron; that "he did not care to serve" was a lasting memory in the community.

== Legacy ==
William Whidden died in 1929; Ion Lewis in 1933. When Whidden died, Jamieson Parker, president of AIA Oregon, described him as "one of the first really fine architects in Portland...[h]e came early, and built well indeed." In November 1930 AIA Oregon, now led by Folger Johnson, dedicated a memorial plaque to the partners in Portland City Hall, stating that the works of the firm represented "outstanding contributions to the beauty of the city."

Whidden & Lewis's residential buildings were mostly in the Colonial Revival style, while their commercial buildings were primarily in the 20th-century classical style. The commercial buildings often featured brick, along with terra cotta ornamentation. Many of their buildings are listed on the National Register of Historic Places (NRHP).

== Architectural works ==
=== In Portland ===
- 1890: Portland Hotel
  - Demolished.
- 1891: Concord Building
  - Whidden & Lewis were among the original tenants; NRHP-listed
- 1891: Trevett–Nunn House
  - NRHP-listed
- 1892: Arlington Club
  - Demolished
- 1892: Ayer–Shea House
  - NRHP-listed
- 1892: Milton W. Smith House
  - NRHP-listed, also contributes to the NRHP-listed South Portland Historic District
- 1893: George Earle Chamberlain House
  - NRHP-listed, also contributes to the NRHP-listed Irvington Historic District
- 1893: Gilbert Building
  - Attributed to Whidden & Lewis though the architect is not documented; NRHP-listed
- 1893: Hamilton Building
  - NRHP-listed
- 1893: Portland Library
  - For the Library Association of Portland; demolished
- 1894: Charles Crook House
  - NRHP-listed
- 1894: W. R. Mackenzie House
  - NRHP-listed
- 1895: William and Annie MacMaster House
  - NRHP-listed
- 1895: Portland Academy
  - Demolished
- 1895: Portland City Hall
  - NRHP-listed
- 1898: Capt. Herbert Holman House
  - NRHP-listed
- 1900: Multnomah Athletic Club
  - Destroyed by fire in 1910
- 1901: Walter F. Burrell House
  - NRHP-listed
- 1901: Whidden–Kerr House
  - Whidden's family home from 1901 until 1911; NRHP-listed
- 1902: Postal Building
  - NRHP-listed
- 1903: Mohawk Building
  - NRHP-listed
- 1904: Charles F. Adams House
  - NRHP-listed
- 1904: W. B. Ayer House
  - NRHP-listed
- 1904: Isam White House
  - NRHP-listed
- 1905: Philip Buehner House
  - NRHP-listed
- 1905: Portland Art Association Museum of Art
  - The predecessor of the Portland Art Museum, which vacated this building in 1931 ahead of the construction of their present building; demolished
- 1906: Concordia Club
- 1907: Corbett Building
  - In 1908 the firm moved here from the Concord Building; demolished in 1988
- 1907: Failing Building
  - Enlarged by six floors in 1913; NRHP-listed
- 1908: Bates–Seller House
  - NRHP-listed
- 1909: Hotel Lucia
  - NRHP-listed
- 1910: Arlington Club
  - Whidden & Lewis also designed the club's earlier building (1892, demolished); NRHP-listed
- 1910: Ira F. Powers Building
  - NRHP-listed
- 1911: Multnomah County Courthouse (former)
  - NRHP-listed
- 1911: Wilcox Building
  - The architects were among the original tenants; NRHP-listed
- 1914: Stevens Building
  - NRHP-listed

=== Elsewhere in Oregon ===
- 1889: Cloud Cap Inn, Hood River County
  - NRHP-listed
- 1893: Friendly Hall, University of Oregon, Eugene
- 1895: Marsh Hall, Pacific University, Forest Grove
- 1907: Herrick Hall, Pacific University, Forest Grove
  - Demolished in 1973
- 1910: First National Bank of Hood River, Hood River
  - NRHP-listed
- 1910: Weinhard-Astoria Hotel, Astoria
  - Demolished
- 1912: Carnegie Hall, Pacific University, Forest Grove

=== In other states ===
- 1890: Union Club (former), Tacoma, Washington
- 1904: Oregon Building, Louisiana Purchase Exposition, St. Louis, Missouri
  - A temporary building modeled on Fort Clatsop

== See also ==
- Doyle & Patterson
- Carl L. Linde
