= Ira F. Powers Building =

Historic building in Portland, Oregon, U.S.

- U.S. National Register of Historic Places
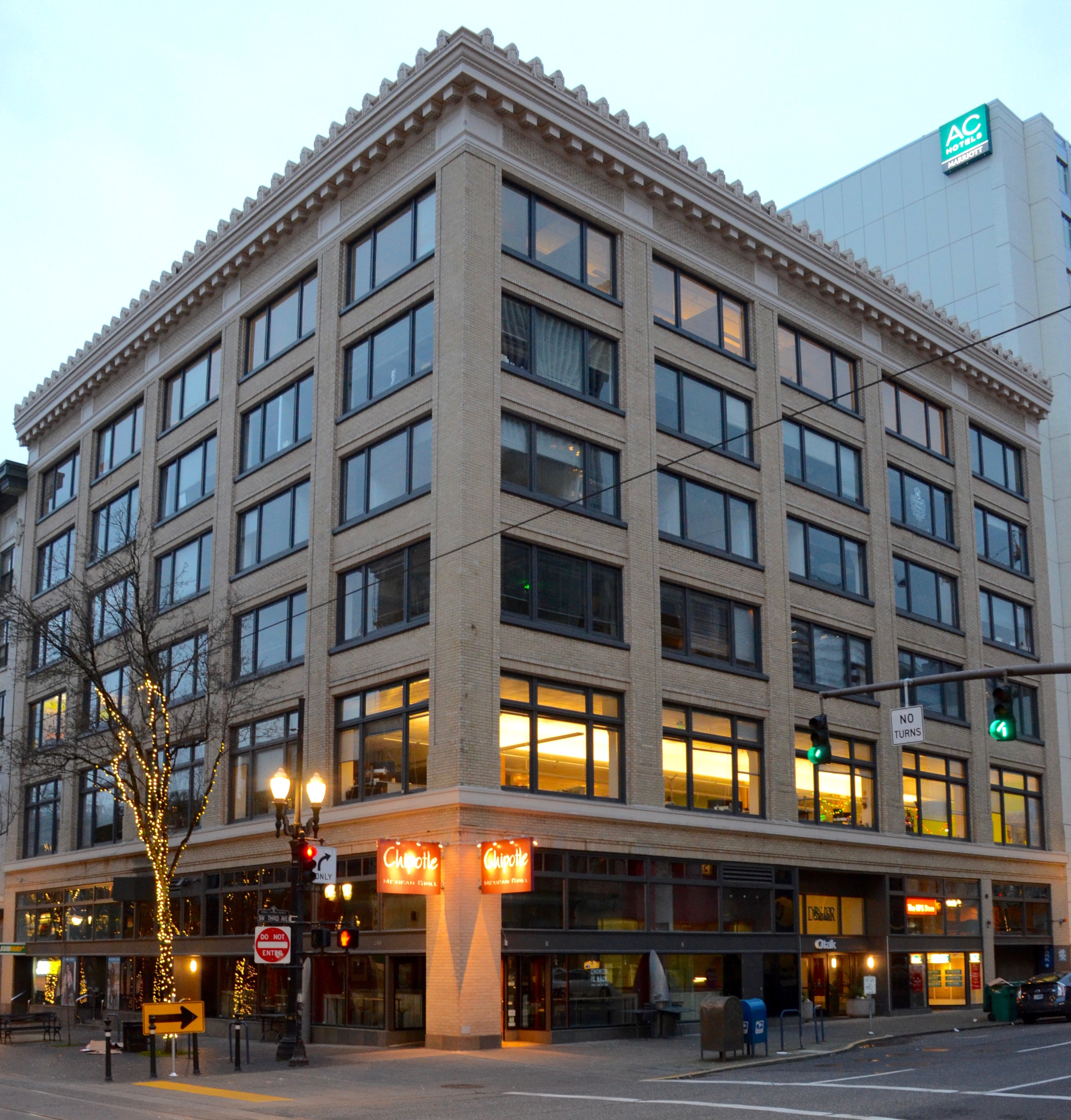
- Viewed from the northwest in 2018
- Location: 804–810 S.W. Third Ave. Portland, Oregon
- Coordinates: 45°31′2.41″N 122°40′32.6″W
- Area: less than one acre
- Built: 1910
- Architect: Whidden & Lewis
- Architectural style: Chicago school, Commercial-style
- NRHP reference No.: 85003082
- Added to NRHP: December 2, 1985

The Ira F. Powers Building, now known as the Director Building, is an historic building located at 804–810 Southwest 3rd Avenue in Portland, Oregon, United States. The building was added to the National Register of Historic Places on December 2, 1985.

== See also ==
- Ira F. Powers Warehouse and Factory
- National Register of Historic Places listings in Southwest Portland, Oregon
