= Gilbert Building (Portland, Oregon) =

Historic building in Portland, Oregon, U.S.

- U.S. National Register of Historic Places
- Portland Historic Landmark
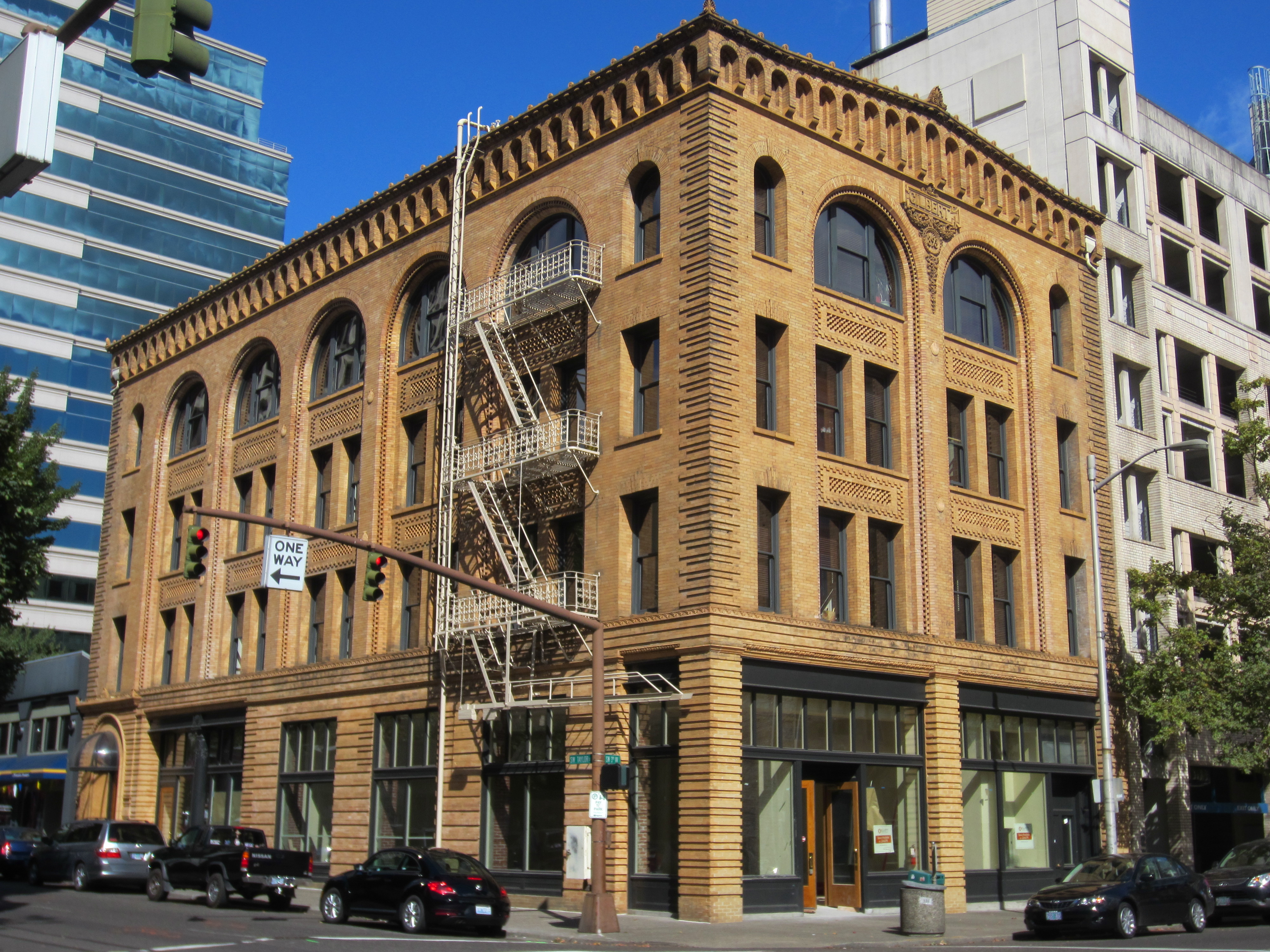
- The building' exterior in 2012

- Location within Portland, Oregon Location within Oregon Location within the United States
- Location: 319 SW Taylor Street; Portland, Oregon
- Coordinates: 45°31′02″N 122°40′35″W
- Area: 0.1 acres (0.040 ha)
- Built: 1893
- Architect: Whidden & Lewis
- Architectural style: Romanesque
- NRHP reference No.: 80003365
- Added to NRHP: August 21, 1980

The Gilbert Building, also known as the Jacobs Building and Taylor Hotel, is a historic building located in downtown Portland, Oregon listed on the National Register of Historic Places.

== See also ==
- National Register of Historic Places listings in Southwest Portland, Oregon
