= Hamilton Building =

Historic building in Portland, Oregon, U.S.

- U.S. National Register of Historic Places
- Portland Historic Landmark
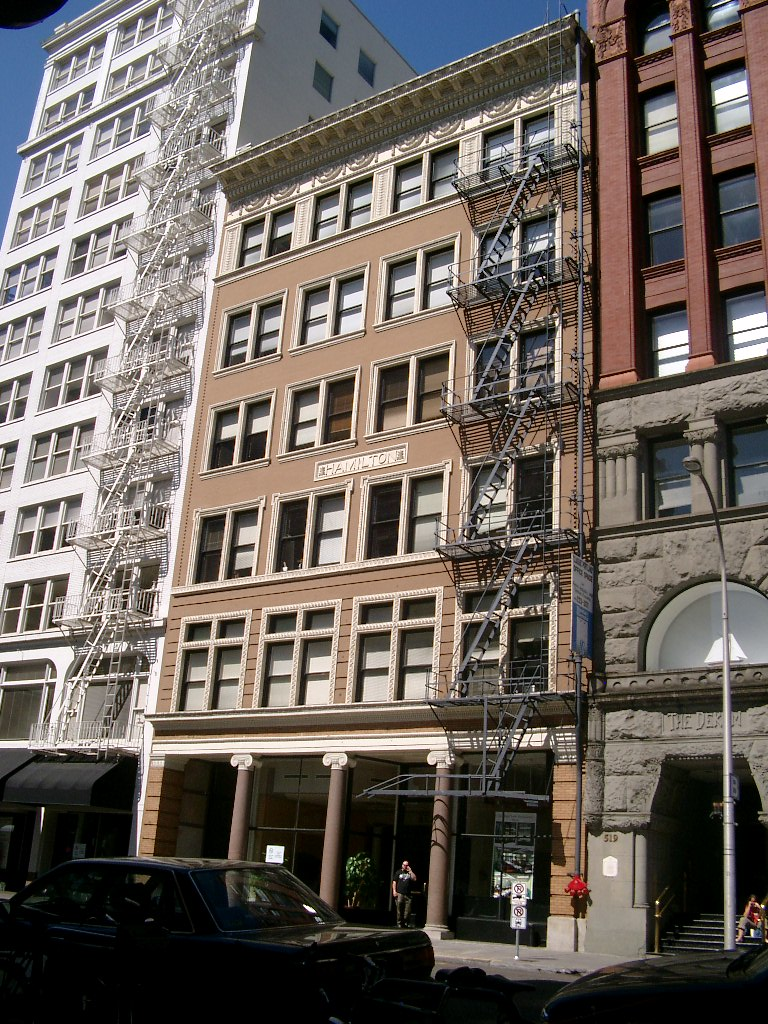
- The Hamilton Building (center).

- Location within Portland, Oregon Location within Oregon Location within the United States
- Location: 529 SW 3rd Avenue; Portland, Oregon
- Coordinates: 45°31′09″N 122°40′31″W
- Area: 0.1 acres (0.040 ha)
- Built: 1893
- Architect: Whidden & Lewis
- Architectural style: Early Commercial
- NRHP reference No.: 77001112
- Added to NRHP: March 17, 1977

The Hamilton Building is a historic office building in downtown Portland, Oregon. It went through a renovation in 1977, and was listed on National Register of Historic Places in March of that year. It is the neighbor of the Dekum Building, a fellow NRHP listing on Third Avenue.

The building, completed in 1893, is an anomaly among its contemporaries. While many buildings built during the late 19th century were often ornate, the Hamilton building has little decoration. It is said that architects Whidden & Lewis designed a ground-breaking building, built decades ahead of later (and similar) trends in commercial architecture. Decoration comes in the form of granite-clad cast iron entry columns and cable mouldings, set against a Japanese-brick facade.

The Hamilton Building is 6 stories tall, and is named after Hamilton Corbett, son of Henry W. Corbett. It is also the first building in Portland designed in the Classical Revival style.

== See also ==
- Architecture of Portland, Oregon
- National Register of Historic Places listings in Southwest Portland, Oregon
