= Bates–Seller House =

Historic building in Portland, Oregon, U.S.

- U.S. National Register of Historic Places
- U.S. Historic district – Contributing property
- Portland Historic Landmark
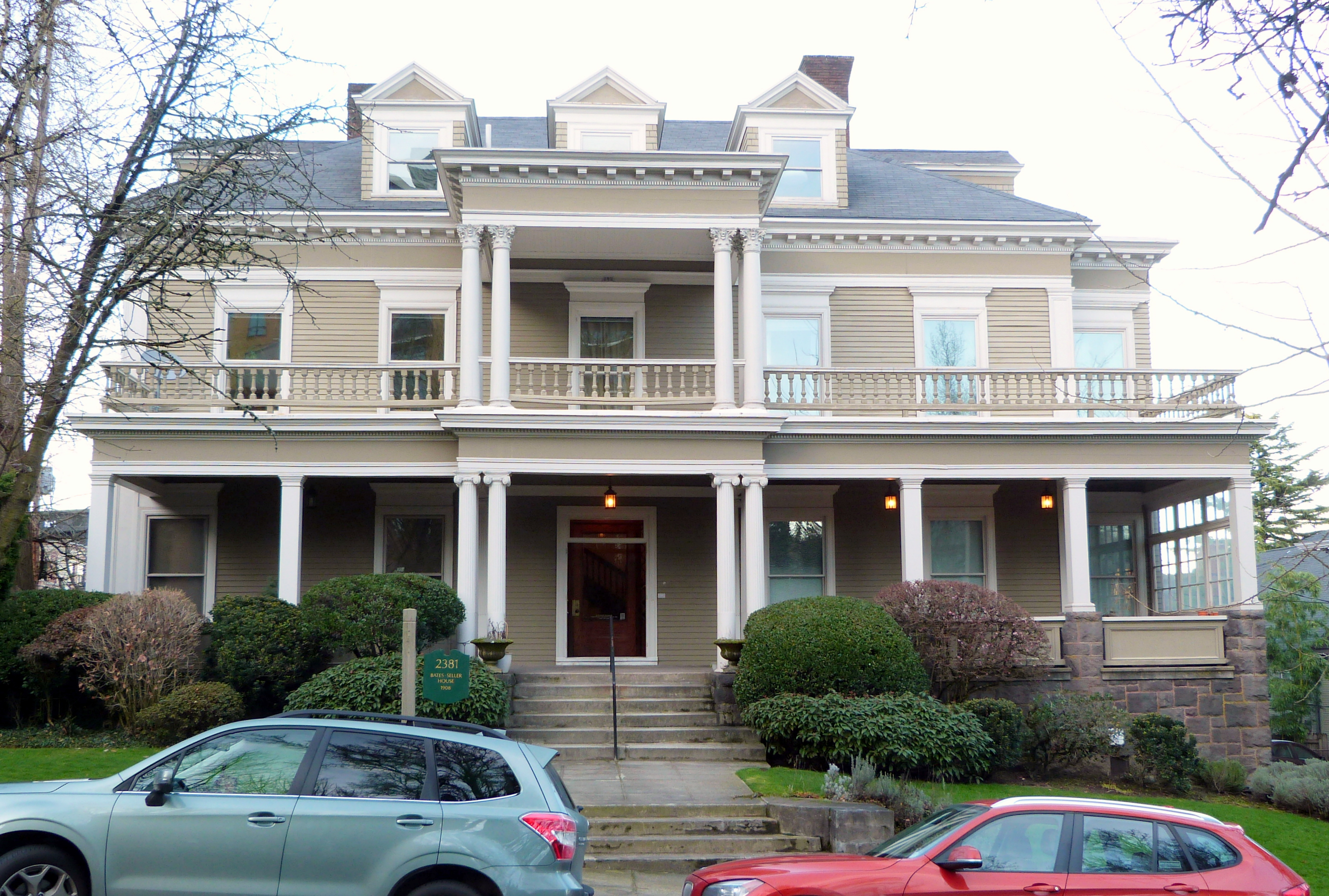
- Bates–Seller House in 2016

- Location within Portland, Oregon
- Location: 2381 NW Flanders Street; Portland, Oregon
- Coordinates: 45°31′33″N 122°42′01″W
- Built: 1908
- Architect: Whidden & Lewis
- Architectural style: Colonial Revival
- Part of: Alphabet Historic District (ID00001293)
- NRHP reference No.: 79002127
- Added to NRHP: August 29, 1979

The Bates–Seller House is a house located in northwest Portland, Oregon listed on the National Register of Historic Places.

== See also ==
- National Register of Historic Places listings in Northwest Portland, Oregon
