= Isam White House =

Historic building in Portland, Oregon, U.S.

- U.S. National Register of Historic Places
- U.S. Historic district – Contributing property
- Portland Historic Landmark
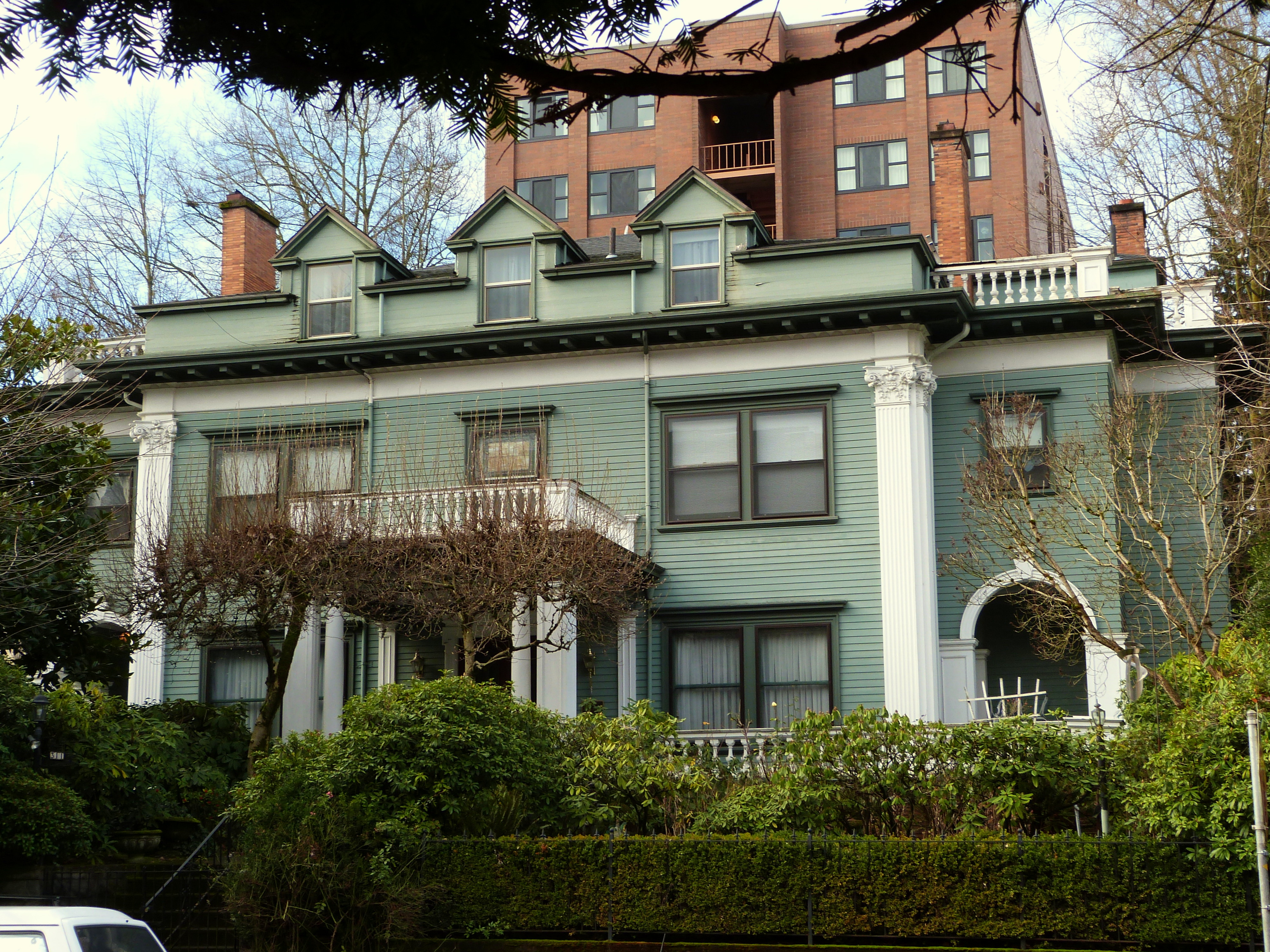
- The building's exterior in 2013

- Location within Portland, Oregon Location within Oregon Location within the United States
- Location: 311 NW 20th Avenue; Portland, Oregon
- Coordinates: 45°31′31″N 122°41′34″W
- Built: 1903–1904 (Note: Sources differ regarding the construction date of the Isam White House. Harrison et al. give a date of 1906 in their inventory of the Alphabet Historic District, evidently based on the City of Portland's contemporary public records database. In National Register documentation focused specifically on the Isam White House, Faulkner and Sekora base their 1903–1904 date on primary sources.)
- Architect: Whidden & Lewis
- Architectural style: Colonial Revival
- Part of: Alphabet Historic District (ID00001293)
- NRHP reference No.: 91001557
- Added to NRHP: October 17, 1991

The Isam White House is a house located in northwest Portland, Oregon, United States. The house was listed on the National Register of Historic Places in 1991.

== See also ==
- National Register of Historic Places listings in Northwest Portland, Oregon
