= William M. Whidden =

American architect (1857–1929)

- Born: February 10, 1857; Boston, Massachusetts, United States
- Died: July 27, 1929 (aged 72); Portland, Oregon, United States
- Occupation: Architect

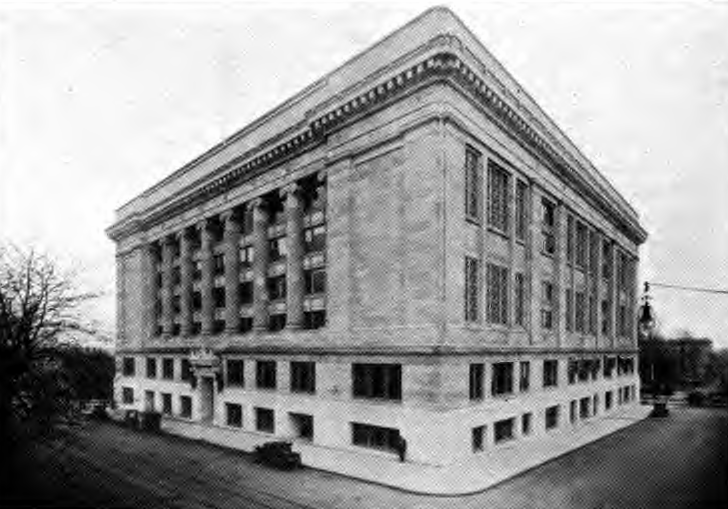
A period view of the former Multnomah County Courthouse (1911 and 1914) in Portland, designed in the Neoclassical style

William M. Whidden (February 10, 1857 – July 27, 1929) was an American architect. Though he began his career in Boston he is best remembered for his work in Portland, Oregon, where in 1889 he was founding member of Whidden & Lewis, a prominent architectural firm.

== Early life ==
William Marcy Whidden was born February 10, 1857, in Boston to Thomas J. Whidden, a contractor and public official, and Ann C. Whidden, nee Martin. The Whidden family had settled in Portsmouth, New Hampshire, in the seventeenth century. Whidden studied as a special student in architecture at the Massachusetts Institute of Technology from 1873 to 1875 with the class of 1877. In 1878 he was admitted to the École des Beaux-Arts in Paris; he was a member of the atelier of Émile Vaudremer. He studied in Paris until 1881; like all contemporary American students of the school at the time he did not earn a degree.

== Professional career ==
Whidden first came to the northwest during the winter of 1881-82 with his new employer, architect Charles F. McKim, in connection with proposed Henry Villard-financed projects in Portland and Tacoma, Washington. He returned in 1883 to supervise construction of those projects which had moved forward, the Portland Hotel and the Tacoma Hotel. The collapse of Villard's fortunes meant that construction in Portland halted after the completion of the foundations, but Whidden remained to complete the smaller Tacoma Hotel in 1884. Whidden then returned to Boston, where he formed the partnership of Chamberlin & Whidden, architects, with William E. Chamberlin, who had also worked for McKim. In September 1887 the board of the Library Association of Portland retained Chamberlin & Whidden to design their proposed new building. Then, in 1888, a citizens committee revived the Portland Hotel project and hired Whidden as architect to complete the hotel; Whidden was on the ground in Portland shortly thereafter. With work in Portland increasing, in 1889 Whidden convinced a visiting friend, architect Ion Lewis, to join him permanently, forming the partnership of Whidden & Lewis. Whidden spent the fall and early winter of 1889-90 in Boston, where he dissolved his partnership with Chamberlin, and in January 1890 settled permanently in Portland with his family.

Their first large work was the Portland Library (1893, demolished), which had been revived in early 1890 after a pause. The completed building had much in common with the Boston Central Library (1895), designed beginning in 1887 by Whidden's former employer McKim, and that building's inspiration, the Sainte-Geneviève Library (1851) in Paris. Portland architect and author Richard Marlitt wrote that Whidden & Lewis was the first modern architectural office in Portland. The city had never before seen architects with their education and "polished ability." They went on to design major buildings including the Portland City Hall (1895, NRHP-listed) and the former Multnomah County Courthouse (1911 and 1914) as well as a wide range of commercial buildings and private homes. Their residential buildings were mostly in the Colonial Revival style, while their commercial buildings were primarily in the twentieth-century classical style. The commercial buildings often featured brick, along with terra cotta ornamentation. Many of their buildings are listed on the United States National Register of Historic Places (NRHP).

== Personal life and death ==
Whidden was married in 1884 to Alice Wygant, great-granddaughter of early Oregon settler John McLoughlin. They had six children in three pairs of twins. Four of their children, three sons and daughter, lived to adulthood; only two, both sons, outlived their father. He was a member of the Arlington Club; his firm designed its building.

In 1901 Whidden designed a home for his family, a rare local example of Prairie School architecture which they called "High Hatch" but which is now known as the Whidden–Kerr House and Garden. The Whiddens lived there until selling in 1911. Whidden died July 29, 1929, at his home in the Mallory Hotel at the age of 72. At the time of his death, Portland architect Jamieson Parker, president of AIA Oregon, described him as "one of the first really fine architects in Portland...[h]e came early, and built well indeed."
