= Trevett–Nunn House =

Historic building in Portland, Oregon, U.S.

- U.S. National Register of Historic Places
- U.S. Historic district – Contributing property
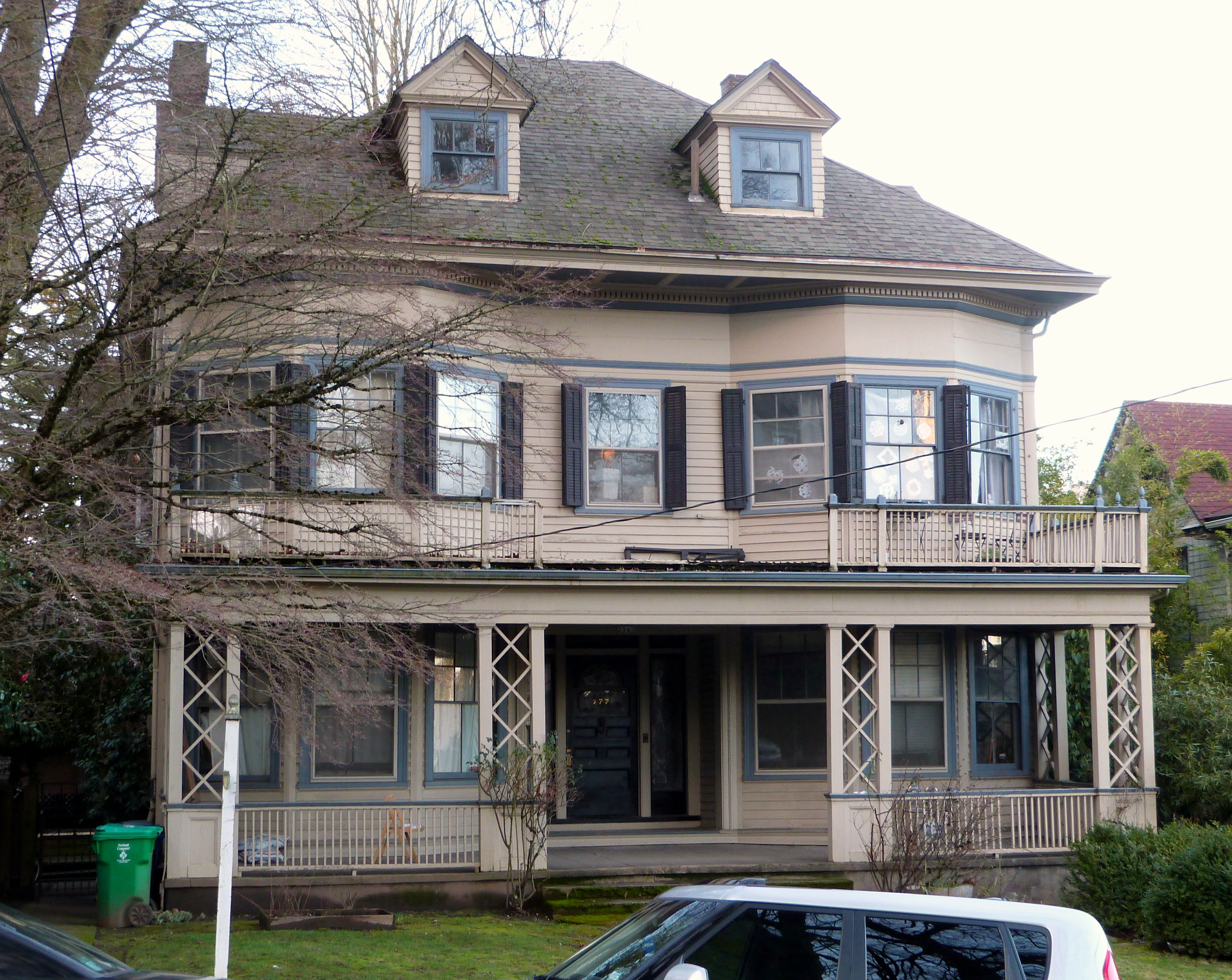
- The house's exterior in 2016

- Location within Portland, Oregon Location within Oregon Location within the United States
- Location: 2347 NW Flanders Street; Portland, Oregon
- Coordinates: 45°31′33″N 122°41′58″W
- Built: 1891
- Architect: Whidden & Lewis
- Architectural style: Colonial Revival
- Part of: Alphabet Historic District (ID00001293)
- NRHP reference No.: 80003376
- Added to NRHP: February 5, 1980

The Trevett–Nunn House is a house located in northwest Portland, Oregon listed on the National Register of Historic Places.

== See also ==
- National Register of Historic Places listings in Northwest Portland, Oregon
