= Failing Office Building =

Historic building in Portland, Oregon, U.S.

- U.S. National Register of Historic Places
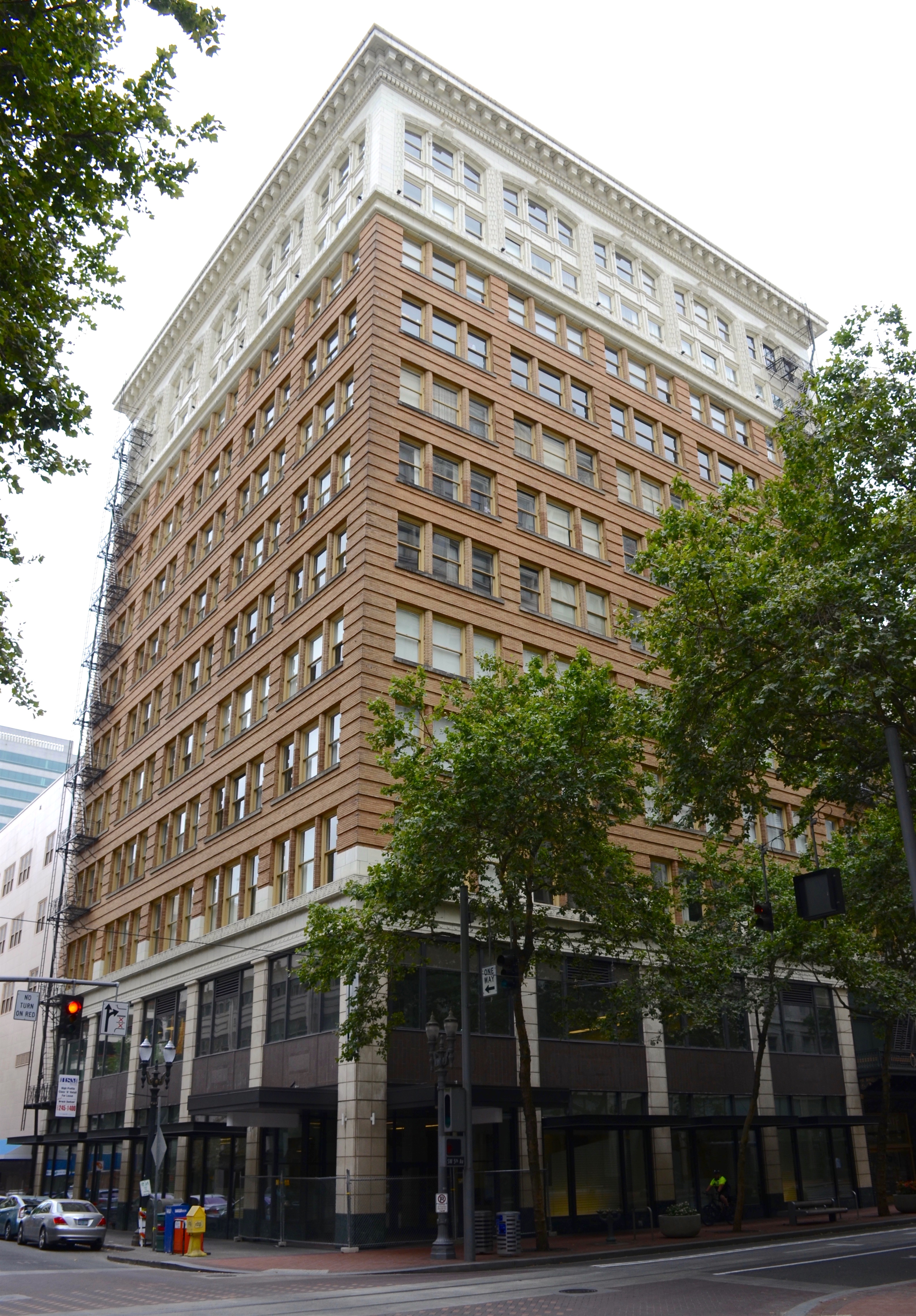
- Failing Office Building in 2017

- Location within Portland, Oregon Location within Oregon Location within the United States
- Location: 620 SW 5th Avenue; Portland, Oregon
- Coordinates: 45°31′09″N 122°40′37″W
- Built: 1907
- Architect: Whidden & Lewis
- Architectural style: Early Commercial
- MPS: Downtown Portland, Oregon MPS
- NRHP reference No.: 07001129
- Added to NRHP: October 31, 2007

The Failing Office Building is a building in downtown Portland, Oregon, United States that was listed on the National Register of Historic Places on October 31, 2007. The building was built during the rapid growth in Portland's business district after the Lewis and Clark Centennial Exposition in 1905. It was built with six stories in 1907, with a six-story addition in 1913. It features a reinforced steel-frame structure with facades of yellow brick and glazed terra cotta.

The Failing Office Building is currently known as The 620 Building.

== History ==
The building was built for Henry Failing, the fifteenth mayor of Portland. He was the son of Josiah Failing, also a mayor of Portland. It was originally named the Gevurtz Building, for the ground-floor Gevurtz Furniture Company. In 1918, the Portland Gas and Coke Company signed a lease with the Failing estate, at which time it was named the Gasco Building. Portland Gas and Coke moved its operations to the Public Service Building in 1927, so the building was renamed the Failing Building.

The architects, William M. Whidden and Ion Lewis, of the firm Whidden & Lewis, were prominent in Portland around the beginning of the 20th century. Their residential buildings were mostly in the Colonial Revival style, while their commercial buildings were primarily in the 20th century classical style. The commercial buildings often featured brick, along with terra cotta ornamentation.

In December 2006, Walker Place LLC purchased the 103,077-square-foot (9,576.2 m^{2}) Failing Office Building (620 Building) from 620 Associates LLC for $11.35 million.

== Renovations ==
In 1913, Whidden & Lewis oversaw the addition of six stories for the Gevurtz Furniture Company. In 1951, JJ Newberry remodeled the first and second floors (Glenn Stanton Architect) of the Failing Building and constructed a new six-story building, which replaced the Richmond Building, located just to the east. A ceramic veneer was added which covered the original large window openings on the first and second floors.

In 2008, the Failing Building (620 Building) underwent a major facade renovation of the first and second floors. The 1951 ceramic veneer was removed, allowing the display windows to be reinstalled. With the addition of new steel awnings, concrete pilasters, and decorative tile, the building's facade was renovated to an approximation of its original 1913 appearance.

== See also ==
- Architecture in Portland, Oregon
- National Register of Historic Places listings in Southwest Portland, Oregon
