= Dosch =

Dosch is a surname. Notable people with the surname include:

- Henry E. Dosch (1841–1925), Civil War veteran
  - Henry E. Dosch House
- Laetitia Dosch (born 1980), French-Swiss actress, playwright, and director
- Mark Dosch (born 1960), American politician
- Tom Dosch, American football coach and player

== See also ==
- Bosch (surname)
