= Honeyman House =

Honeyman House may refer to any of three houses in Portland, Oregon, that are listed on the U.S. National Register of Historic Places:

- David T. and Nan Wood Honeyman House
- John S. Honeyman House
- Walter B. and Myrtle E. Honeyman House, a National Register listing in Northwest Portland
