= Bohnsen Cottages =

Historic building complex in Portland, Oregon, U.S.

- U.S. National Register of Historic Places
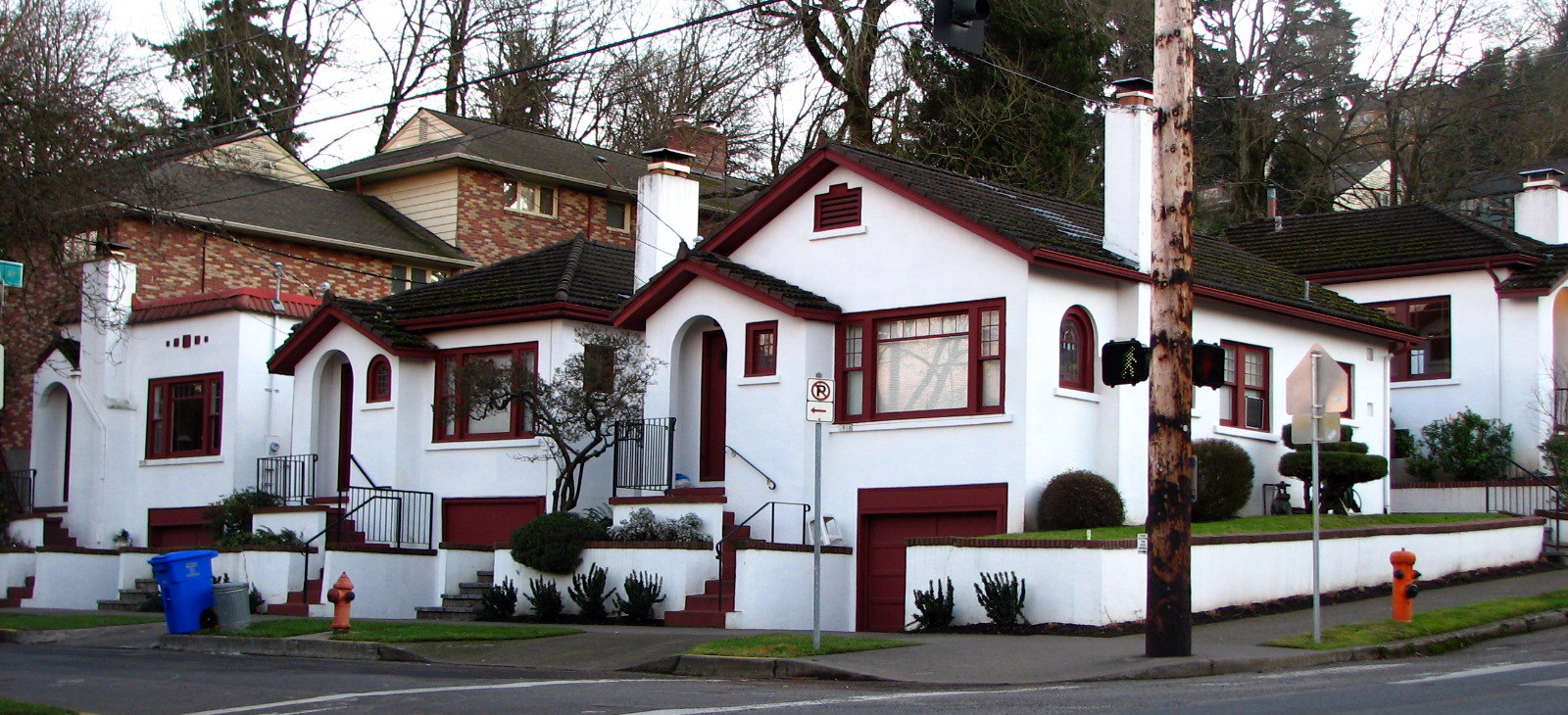

- Location within Portland, Oregon
- Location: 1918-1926 SW Elm St and 2412-2416 SW Vista Ave, Portland, Oregon
- Coordinates: 45°30′35″N 122°41′55″W
- Area: less than one acre
- Built: 1926
- Architectural style: Mission/Spanish Revival
- NRHP reference No.: 08001182
- Added to NRHP: December 4, 2008

The Bohnsen Cottages is a building complex located in southwest Portland, Oregon listed on the National Register of Historic Places.

== See also ==
- National Register of Historic Places listings in Southwest Portland, Oregon
