= Imperial Garage =

Historic building in Portland, Oregon, U.S.

- U.S. National Register of Historic Places
- Portland Historic Landmark
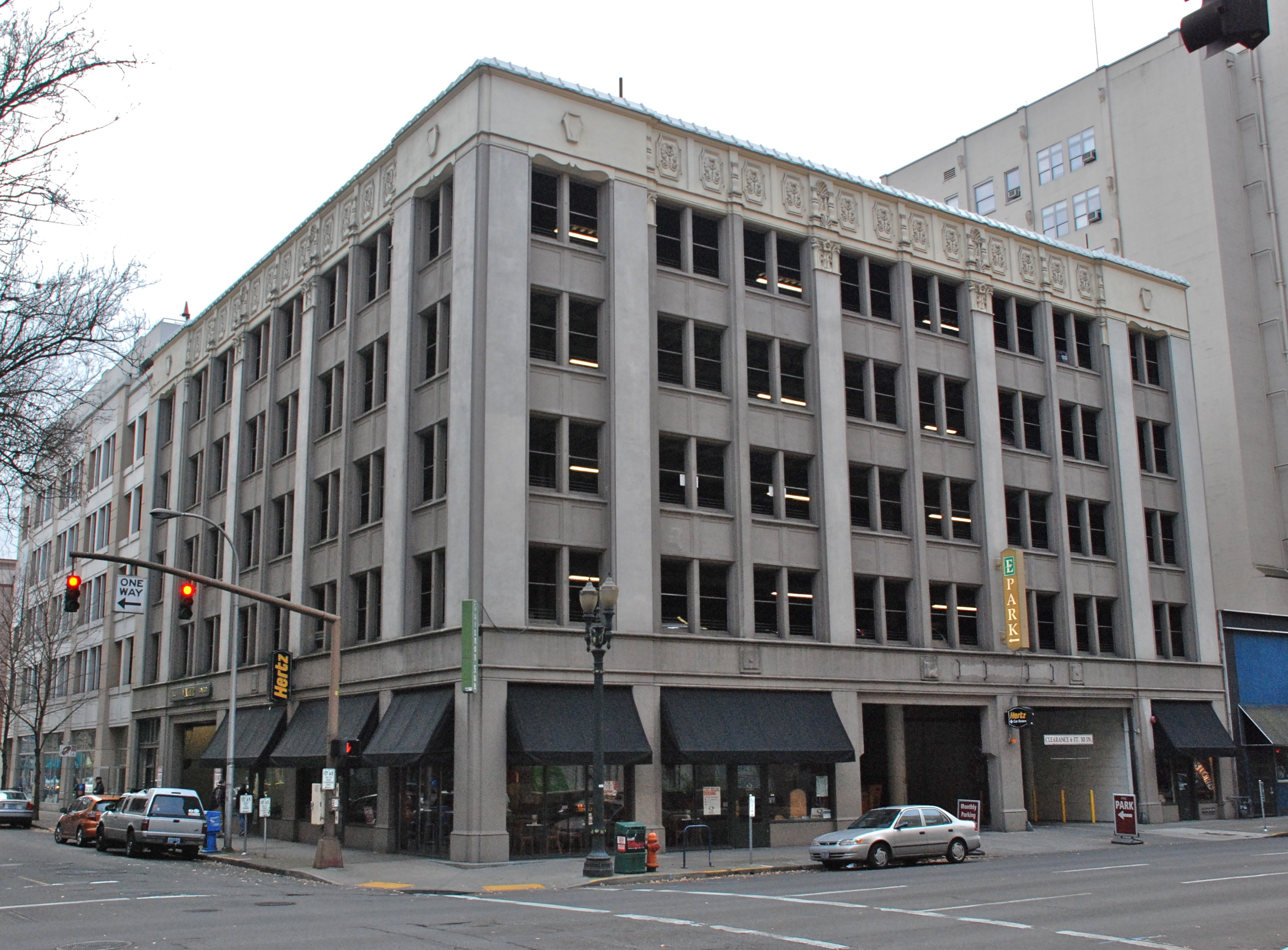
- The Imperial Garage in 2011

- Location within Portland, Oregon Location within Oregon Location within the United States
- Location: 212 SW 4th Avenue; Portland, Oregon
- Coordinates: 45°31′17″N 122°40′28″W
- Area: 0.2 acres (0.081 ha)
- Built: 1923
- Architect: Frederick A. Fritsch, Frederick Aandahl
- Architectural style: Modern Movement
- NRHP reference No.: 93000451
- Added to NRHP: May 27, 1993

The Imperial Garage, located in downtown Portland, Oregon, is listed on the National Register of Historic Places.

== See also ==
- National Register of Historic Places listings in Southwest Portland, Oregon
