= Costanzo Family House =

Historic building in Portland, Oregon, U.S.

- U.S. National Register of Historic Places
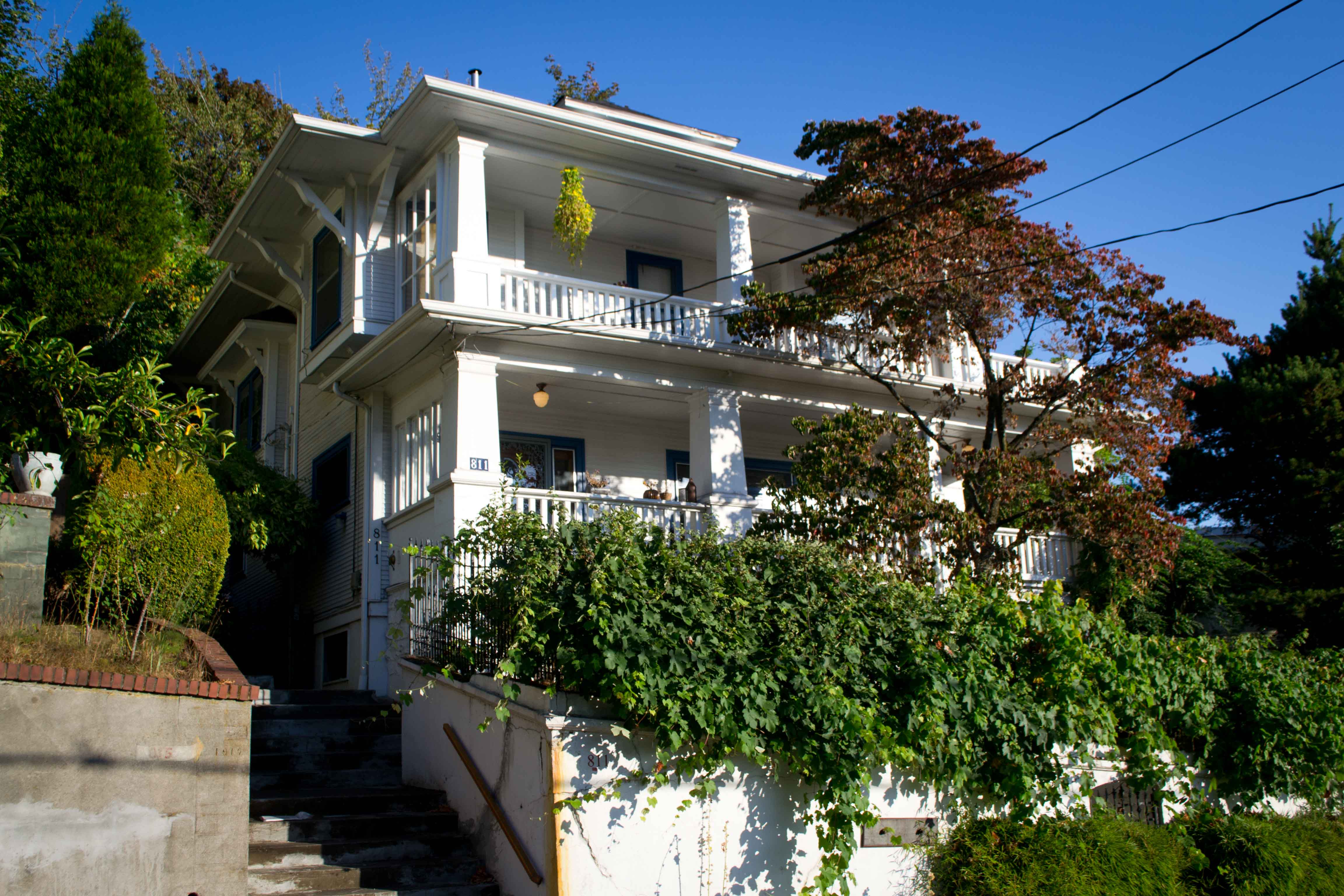
- The Costanzo House in 2012.

- Location within Portland, Oregon
- Location: 811 SW Broadway Drive; Portland, Oregon
- Coordinates: 45°30′16″N 122°41′09″W
- Area: less than one acre
- Built: 1912
- Architect: Nat Costanzo
- Architectural style: Late 19th And Early 20th Century American Movements, American Foursquare
- NRHP reference No.: 07000842
- Added to NRHP: August 20, 2007

The Costanzo Family House is a house located in southwest Portland, Oregon, listed on the National Register of Historic Places.

== See also ==
- National Register of Historic Places listings in Southwest Portland, Oregon
