= C. K. Henry Building =

Historic building in Portland, Oregon, U.S.

- Henry, C. K., Building
- U.S. National Register of Historic Places
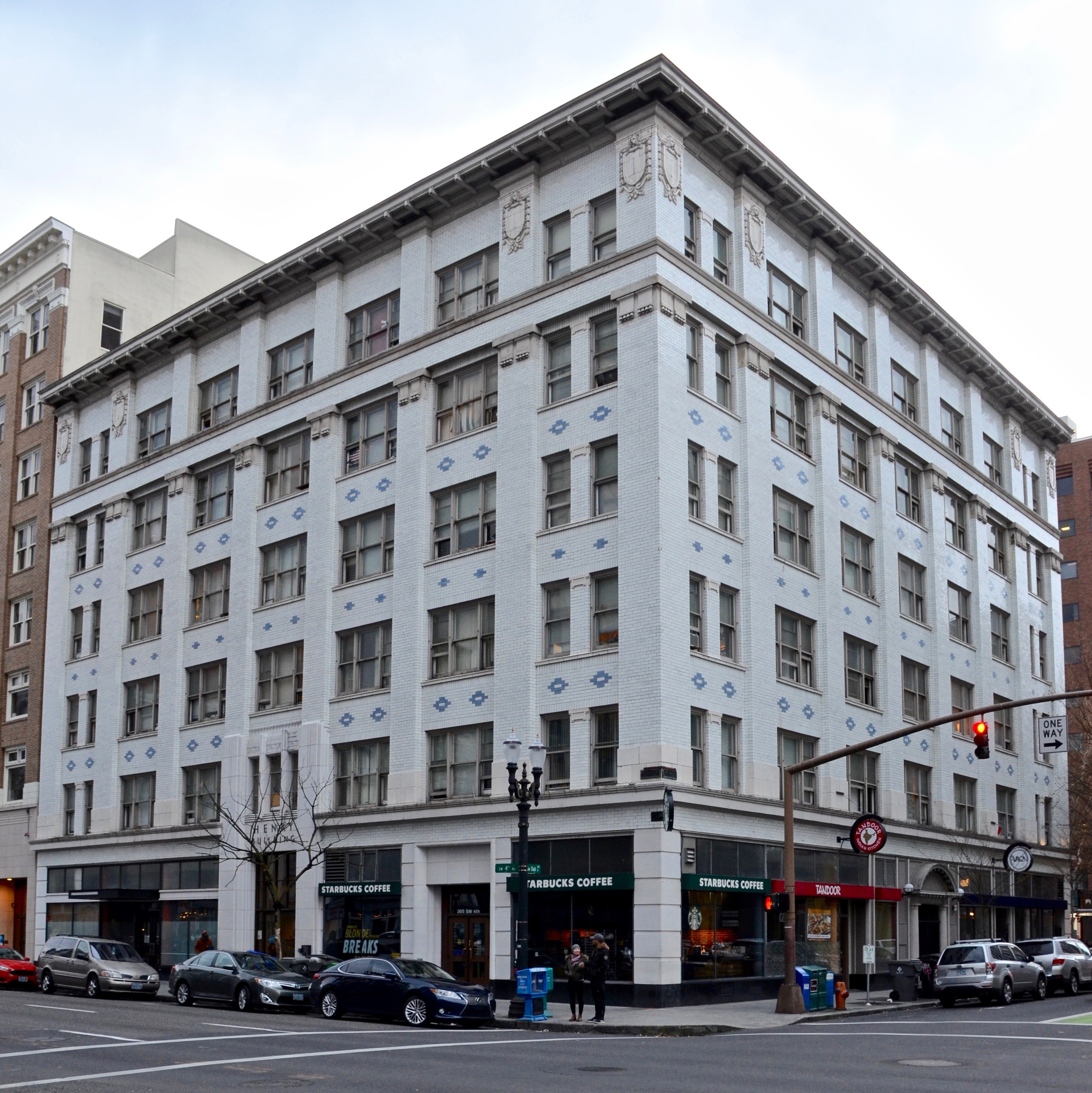
- Viewed from the northeast in 2018

- Location within Portland, Oregon Location within Oregon Location within the United States
- Location: 309 SW 4th Ave., Portland, Oregon
- Coordinates: 45°31′16″N 122°40′27″W
- Area: less than one acre
- Built: 1909
- Architect: Berndt, Francis J.
- Architectural style: Chicago
- NRHP reference No.: 82003743
- Added to NRHP: May 13, 1982

The C. K. Henry Building is an historic building at 309 Southwest 4th Avenue in downtown Portland, Oregon, in the United States. The building was added to the National Register of Historic Places in 1982. It was designed by Francis Berndt in 1909. The building underwent seismic upgrades in 2020.

== See also ==
- National Register of Historic Places listings in Southwest Portland, Oregon
