= A. G. Long House =

Historic building in Portland, Oregon, U.S.

- U.S. National Register of Historic Places
- Portland Historic Landmark
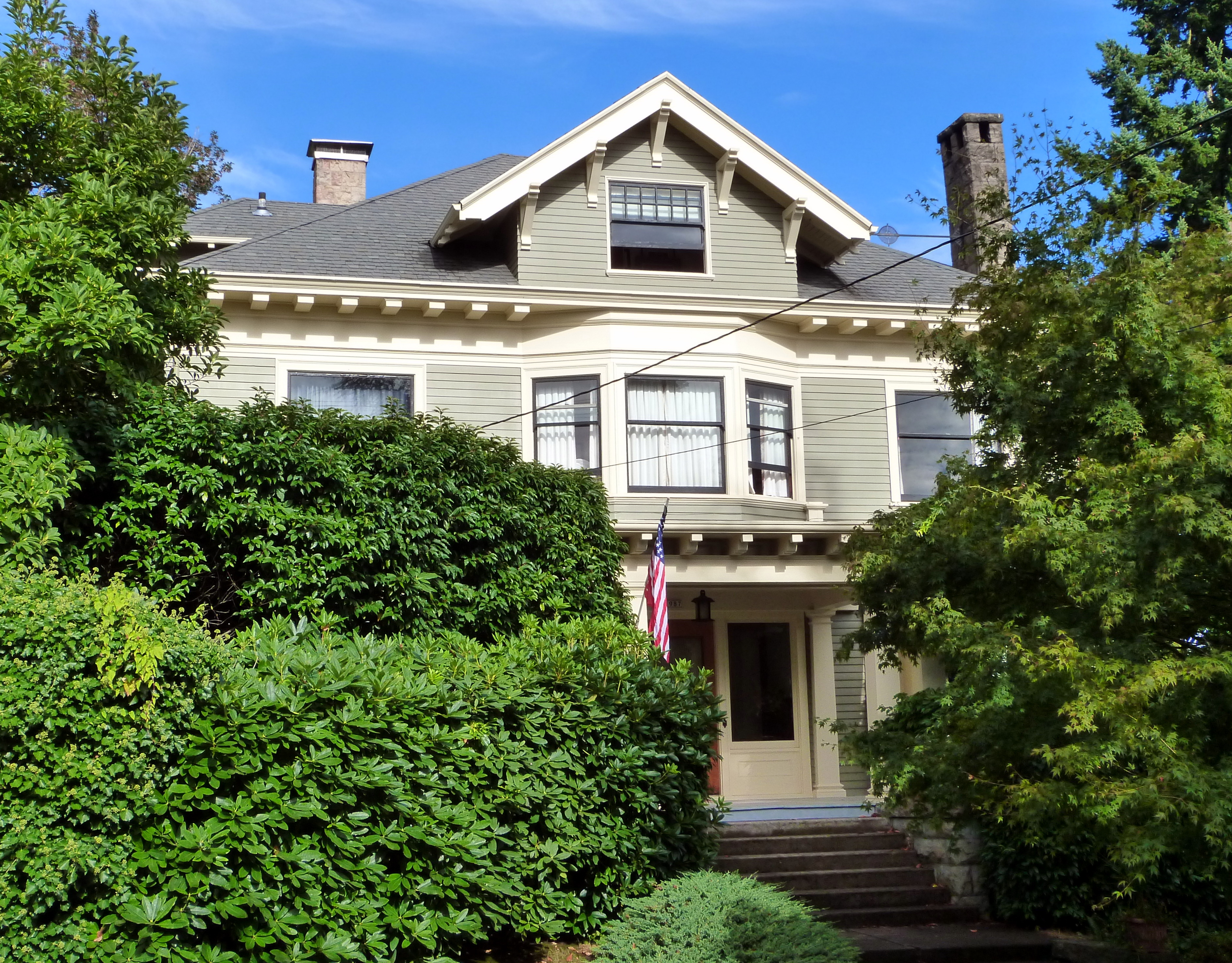
- The Long House in 2013.

- Location within Portland, Oregon
- Location: 1987 SW 16th Avenue; Portland, Oregon
- Coordinates: 45°30′43″N 122°41′37″W
- Area: 0.48 acres (0.19 ha)
- Built: 1908
- Built by: Rosco C. Brooks
- Architectural style: Colonial Revival
- NRHP reference No.: 93000917
- Added to NRHP: September 9, 1993

The A. G. Long House is a historic house in Portland, Oregon, United States. Built in 1908, it is perhaps the finest example of residential Colonial Revival architecture from the years soon after the style was introduced to Portland. It is additionally notable for its unusual admixture of Craftsman elements to the overall Colonial form, especially on the interior. The house was added to the National Register of Historic Places in 1993.

== See also ==
- National Register of Historic Places listings in Southwest Portland, Oregon
