= National Register of Historic Places listings in South and Southwest Portland, Oregon =

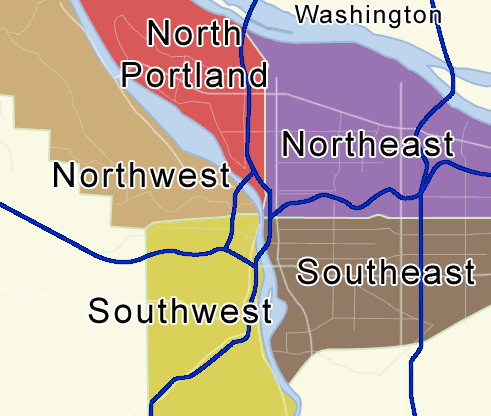
Locator map showing five of Portland's six quadrants. Click a quadrant to go to its National Register list. (South Portland listings are included on the Southwest Portland list.)

This list presents the full set of buildings, structures, objects, sites, or districts designated on the National Register of Historic Places in South and Southwest Portland, Oregon, United States, and offers brief descriptive information about each of them. The National Register recognizes places of national, state, or local historic significance across the United States. Out of over 90,000 National Register sites nationwide, Oregon is home to over 2,000, and over one-fourth of those are found partially or wholly in Portland. While these sites are widely spread across all six of Portland's quadrants, heavy concentrations are found in the Downtown and Southwest Hills neighborhoods of the Southwest quadrant, and the Northwest District neighborhood of the Northwest quadrant.

Only historic places within the municipal boundaries of Portland are shown in this list and its four companion lists for the other quadrants. Some sites beyond city limits will appear in other lists showing "Portland" as a general locality, but are excluded here. Although Portland's legal boundaries extend into Clackamas and Washington counties, all of the city's National Register sites lie within Multnomah County.

This National Park Service list is complete through NPS recent listings posted August 21, 2026.

== Current listings ==
	Name on the Register	Image	Date listed	Location	Description
1	Maud and Belle Ainsworth House	Maud and Belle Ainsworth House	February 27, 1986 (#86000288)	2542 SW Hillcrest Drive; 45°30′27″N 122°42′06″W	Maud Ainsworth was a prominent Northwest photographer in a cutting-edge, modernist style. The 1907 Arts and Crafts house she shared with her sister Belle included her studio and darkroom. The house is a defining work of architect William C. Knighton, a designer of importance throughout Oregon.
2	Alderway Building	Alderway Building	June 11, 2024 (#100010438)	521-539 SW Broadway; 45°31′13″N 122°40′45″W	
3	Ambassador Apartments	Ambassador Apartments	February 26, 1979 (#79003738)	1209 SW 6th Avenue; 45°30′56″N 122°40′51″W	
4	Annand–Loomis House	Annand–Loomis House	June 27, 1997 (#97000586)	1825 SW Vista Avenue; 45°30′52″N 122°41′49″W	
5	Arlington Club	Arlington Club	August 30, 2010 (#10000599)	811 SW Salmon Street; 45°31′04″N 122°40′54″W	A four-story brick and terra cotta structure built in 1910.
6	Arminius Hotel	Arminius Hotel	July 14, 1988 (#88001038)	1022–1038 SW Morrison Street; 45°31′12″N 122°40′58″W	
7	Arnold–Park Log Home	Arnold–Park Log Home	February 12, 2010 (#10000016)	12000 SW Boones Ferry Road; 45°26′15″N 122°41′22″W	
8	Auditorium and Music Hall	Auditorium and Music Hall	February 22, 1980 (#80003357)	920–928 SW 3rd Avenue; 45°30′59″N 122°40′34″W	One of the few remaining Romanesque Revival buildings in Portland, this 1890s building housed concert space, a commerce center, a dance hall, apartments, a boxing gym, and offices through its history.
9	Auto Rest Garage	Auto Rest Garage	September 12, 1996 (#96000997)	925–935 SW 10th Avenue; 45°31′06″N 122°41′00″W	
10	Balfour–Guthrie Building	Balfour–Guthrie Building	August 1, 2002 (#02000824)	733 SW Oak Street; 45°31′21″N 122°40′44″W	
11	Ball–Ehrman House	Ball–Ehrman House	February 22, 1991 (#91000143)	2040 SW Laurel Street; 45°30′38″N 122°41′57″W	
12	Bank of California Building	Bank of California Building	March 14, 1978 (#78002306)	330 SW 6th Avenue; 45°31′16″N 122°40′38″W	
13	Baruh–Zell House	Baruh–Zell House	April 5, 2007 (#07000256)	3131 SW Talbot Road; 45°30′05″N 122°42′33″W	Leading Portland residential architect Herman Brookman's design for this 1937 Tudor Revival house was one of his finest achievements. In many of its features, such as curved walls, stripped-down ornamentation, recessed entry, and functionally-oriented rear elevation, it heralds the transition from highly traditional European styles executed on a grand scale to a modernized and simplified reinterpretation of those styles responsive to contemporary technology and preferences.
14	John M. and Elizabeth Bates House No. 1	John M. and Elizabeth Bates House No. 1	June 12, 1990 (#90000846)	1837 SW Edgewood Road; 45°30′16″N 122°41′55″W	Architect Wade Pipes, a pivotal figure in the Arts and Crafts movement in Oregon, designed this house in the mid-1930s. Built in 1935, it represents that decade's transition in Pipes' focus from English vernacular exterior elements toward clean lines, rectilinear forms, and minimal decoration. Its interior spaces and details express his devotion to Arts and Crafts principles. John and Elizabeth Bates subsequently commissioned three further houses from him.
15	Bedell Building	Bedell Building	February 23, 1989 (#89000066)	520–538 SW 6th Avenue; 45°31′11″N 122°40′40″W	
16	John Virginius and Annice Bennes House	John Virginius and Annice Bennes House	March 27, 2013 (#13000119)	122 SW Marconi Avenue; 45°31′23″N 122°42′18″W	
17	Benson Hotel	Benson Hotel	November 20, 1986 (#86003175)	309–319 SW Broadway; 45°31′19″N 122°40′43″W	
18	Simon Benson House	Simon Benson House	October 25, 2002 (#01000155)	1803 SW Park Avenue; 45°30′44″N 122°41′07″W	Was originally listed in 1983 at its original location at 1504 SW 11th Avenue. Was delisted and relisted on the same day in 2002 after it was moved to its present location.
19	Charles F. Berg Building	Charles F. Berg Building	September 1, 1983 (#83002170)	615 SW Broadway; 45°31′11″N 122°40′47″W	
20	Beth Israel School	Beth Israel School	August 10, 1978 (#78002308)	1230 SW Main Street; 45°31′04″N 122°41′11″W	
21	Bishopcroft of the Episcopal Diocese of Oregon	Bishopcroft of the Episcopal Diocese of Oregon	May 18, 2000 (#00000061)	1832 SW Elm Street; 45°30′34″N 122°41′52″W	
22	Bishop's House	Bishop's House	October 18, 1974 (#74001706)	219–223 SW Harvey Milk Street; 45°31′13″N 122°40′26″W	
23	Bohnsen Cottages	Bohnsen Cottages	December 4, 2008 (#08001182)	1918–1926 SW Elm Street and 2412–2416 SW Vista Avenue; 45°30′35″N 122°41′55″W	
24	Joseph R. Bowles House	Joseph R. Bowles House	March 8, 1978 (#78002309)	1934 SW Vista Avenue; 45°30′47″N 122°41′48″W	
25	J. S. Bradley House	J. S. Bradley House	February 22, 1991 (#91000133)	2111 SW Vista Avenue; 45°30′43″N 122°41′53″W	
26	Broadway Building	Broadway Building	September 12, 1996 (#96001000)	715 SW Morrison Street; 45°31′10″N 122°40′47″W	
27	Brown Apartments	Brown Apartments	October 17, 1991 (#91001553)	807 SW 14th Avenue; 45°31′13″N 122°41′13″W	
28	Burnside Bridge	Burnside Bridge	November 14, 2012 (#12000931)	Spanning the Willamette River at river mile 12.7; 45°31′23″N 122°40′03″W	Opened in 1926 as a centerpiece of Portland's transportation system, the Burnside Bridge was embroiled in a public corruption scandal during its development. Part of a three-bridge package funded by a public bond issue, it was one of the final works in bridge engineer Gustav Lindenthal's impressive career. (Note: The three bridges in the bond-funded package were the Burnside Bridge, Ross Island Bridge, and Sellwood Bridge (which has since been demolished and replaced). Lindenthal was the supervising engineer for the construction of all three bridges. He was responsible for the design of the Ross Island and Sellwood bridges, but for the Burnside Bridge he adapted a design by Ira G. Hedrick and Robert E. Kremers. Hedrick and Kremers were removed from the project due to the corruption scandal.) It is one of the country's heaviest bascule bridges, and the earliest to use a concrete deck on the lift span.
29	Buyers Building	Buyers Building	January 28, 1994 (#93001567)	317 SW Alder Street; 45°31′09″N 122°40′31″W	
30	Calumet Hotel	Calumet Hotel	September 21, 1984 (#84003073)	620–626 SW Park Avenue; 45°31′11″N 122°40′49″W	
31	Calvary Presbyterian Church	Calvary Presbyterian Church	March 29, 1972 (#72001086)	1422 SW 11th Avenue; 45°30′55″N 122°41′08″W	
32	Campbell Court Hotel	Campbell Court Hotel	June 25, 2008 (#08000559)	1115 SW 11th Avenue; 45°31′03″N 122°41′06″W	
33	David Campbell Memorial	David Campbell Memorial	September 24, 2010 (#10000802)	1800 W Burnside Street; 45°31′22″N 122°41′24″W	
34	Cardwell–Parrish House	Cardwell–Parrish House	February 22, 1991 (#91000130)	7543 S Fulton Park Boulevard (Note: This property as listed on the National Register has a Southwest Portland address. The address shown has been updated to reflect the creation of the new South Portland addressing area on May 1, 2020.); 45°28′11″N 122°40′27″W	
35	Judge Charles Henry and Mary Bidwell Carey House	Judge Charles Henry and Mary Bidwell Carey House	November 2, 2022 (#100000832)	1950 South Carey Ln. 45°26′56″N 122°39′33″W	
36	Central Building, Public Library	Central Building, Public Library	January 11, 1979 (#79002129)	801 SW 10th Avenue; 45°31′09″N 122°41′00″W	Architect A.E. Doyle's 1913 public library building was one of the first open plan libraries in the US. It has become the core of the Multnomah County Library system.
37	Francis R. Chown House	Francis R. Chown House	February 23, 1990 (#90000296)	2030–2032 SW Main Street; 45°31′12″N 122°41′41″W	
38	Clyde Hotel	Clyde Hotel	January 21, 1994 (#93001498)	1000–1038 SW Harvey Milk Street; 45°31′19″N 122°40′54″W	
39	Frank J. and Maude Louise Cobbs Estate	Frank J. and Maude Louise Cobbs Estate	July 25, 2002 (#02000826)	2424 SW Montgomery Drive; 45°30′34″N 122°42′10″W	
40	Commodore Hotel	Commodore Hotel	June 27, 1984 (#84003076)	1601–1617 SW Morrison Street; 45°31′19″N 122°41′18″W	
41	Concord Building	Concord Building	October 21, 1977 (#77001110)	208 SW Harvey Milk Street; 45°31′12″N 122°40′26″W	
42	Corbett Brothers Auto Storage Garage	Corbett Brothers Auto Storage Garage	September 12, 1996 (#96000999)	630 SW Pine Street; 45°31′20″N 122°40′39″W	
43	Corkish Apartments	Corkish Apartments	December 2, 1981 (#81000514)	2734–2740 SW 2nd Avenue; 45°30′11″N 122°40′46″W	
44	Cornelius Hotel	Cornelius Hotel	February 27, 1986 (#86000286)	801–809 SW Alder Street; 45°31′14″N 122°40′49″W	
45	Costanzo Family House	Costanzo Family House	August 20, 2007 (#07000842)	811 SW Broadway Drive; 45°30′16″N 122°41′09″W	
46	Cotillion Hall	Cotillion Hall	March 9, 1979 (#79002130)	406 SW 14th Avenue; 45°31′22″N 122°41′06″W	Now known as the Crystal Ballroom
47	Cumberland Apartments	Cumberland Apartments	October 17, 1990 (#90001509)	1405 SW Park Avenue; 45°30′54″N 122°41′02″W	
48	The Dekum	The Dekum	October 10, 1980 (#80003363)	505–519 SW 3rd Avenue; 45°31′10″N 122°40′31″W	
49	Digman–Zidell House	Digman–Zidell House	May 27, 1993 (#93000453)	2959 SW Bennington Drive; 45°31′14″N 122°42′43″W	
50	Henry E. Dosch House	Henry E. Dosch House	October 2, 1978 (#78002312)	4825 SW Dosch Park Lane; 45°29′15″N 122°42′25″W	
51	Alice Druhot House	Alice Druhot House	February 29, 1988 (#88000079)	1903 SW Cable Avenue; 45°30′52″N 122°41′42″W	
52	Durham–Jacobs House	Durham–Jacobs House	March 6, 1987 (#87000307)	2138 SW Salmon Street; 45°31′15″N 122°41′43″W	
53	J. G. Edwards House	J. G. Edwards House	February 22, 1991 (#91000128)	2645 SW Alta Vista Place; 45°30′32″N 122°42′17″W	
54	Electric Building	Electric Building	February 23, 1989 (#89000059)	621 SW Alder Street; 45°31′12″N 122°40′44″W	
55	Elks Temple	Elks Temple	February 17, 1978 (#78002313)	614 SW 11th Avenue; 45°31′14″N 122°40′57″W	Building currently serves as the west wing of the Sentinel Hotel.
56	Elm Street Apartments	Elm Street Apartments	February 20, 1991 (#91000056)	1825–1837 SW Elm Street; 45°30′36″N 122°41′51″W	
57	Envoy Apartment Building	Envoy Apartment Building	March 3, 1988 (#88000093)	2336 SW Osage Street; 45°31′23″N 122°42′00″W	
58	Equitable Building	Equitable Building	March 30, 1976 (#76001584)	401–421 SW 6th Avenue; 45°31′15″N 122°40′41″W	
59	Failing Office Building	Failing Office Building	October 31, 2007 (#07001129)	620 SW 5th Avenue; 45°31′09″N 122°40′37″W	
60	First Congregational Church	First Congregational Church	May 2, 1975 (#75001594)	1126 SW Park Avenue; 45°30′59″N 122°40′55″W	
61	First National Bank	First National Bank	October 15, 1974 (#74001707)	401–409 SW 5th Avenue; 45°31′14″N 122°40′37″W	
62	First Presbyterian Church of Portland	First Presbyterian Church of Portland	December 19, 1974 (#74002294)	1200 SW Alder Street; 45°31′16″N 122°41′03″W	
63	First Unitarian Church of Portland	First Unitarian Church of Portland	November 22, 1978 (#78002315)	1011 SW 12th Avenue; 45°31′07″N 122°41′08″W	
64	Caroline W. and M. Louise Flanders House	Caroline W. and M. Louise Flanders House	March 1, 1991 (#91000127)	2421 SW Arden Road; 45°30′17″N 122°42′10″W	
65	Flatiron Building	Flatiron Building	March 16, 1989 (#89000200)	1223–1235 SW Harvey Milk Street; 45°31′22″N 122°41′01″W	
66	M. Lloyd Frank Estate	M. Lloyd Frank Estate	April 18, 1979 (#79002133)	615 S Palatine Hill Road; 45°27′01″N 122°40′12″W	
67	Fried–Durkheimer House	Fried–Durkheimer House	November 8, 2019 (#100004606)	2177 SW Broadway Drive; 45°30′27″N 122°41′07″W	
68	Fruit and Flower Mission	Fruit and Flower Mission	June 5, 1986 (#86001225)	1609 SW 12th Avenue; 45°30′52″N 122°41′16″W	
69	J. O. Frye House	J. O. Frye House	June 6, 1985 (#85001183)	2997 SW Fairview Boulevard; 45°31′17″N 122°42′44″W	
70	Joseph Gaston House	Joseph Gaston House	February 21, 1989 (#89000052)	1960 SW 16th Avenue; 45°30′43″N 122°41′34″W	
71	Gaston–Strong House	Gaston–Strong House	February 23, 1990 (#90000292)	1130 SW King Avenue; 45°31′12″N 122°41′43″W	
72	Giesy–Failing House	Giesy–Failing House	February 22, 1991 (#91000137)	1965 SW Montgomery Place; 45°30′49″N 122°41′58″W	
73	Gilbert Building	Gilbert Building	August 21, 1980 (#80003365)	319 SW Taylor Street; 45°31′02″N 122°40′35″W	
74	J. K. Gill Company Building	J. K. Gill Company Building	February 23, 2021 (#100006186)	408 SW 5th Avenue; 45°31′14″N 122°40′35″W	Eight-story building that housed the J. K. Gill Company and its downtown Portland store.
75	Alan and Barbara Goldsmith House	Alan and Barbara Goldsmith House	April 5, 2007 (#07000261)	4140 SW Greenleaf Court; 45°30′10″N 122°43′00″W	
76	Grand Stable Building and Adjacent Commercial Building	Grand Stable Building and Adjacent Commercial Building	October 7, 1982 (#82001512)	411–429 SW 2nd Avenue; 45°31′11″N 122°40′26″W	
77	Bertha M. and Marie A. Green House	Bertha M. and Marie A. Green House	October 15, 1992 (#92001379)	2610 SW Vista Avenue; 45°30′30″N 122°42′11″W	
78	Frederick and Grace Greenwood House	Frederick and Grace Greenwood House	June 19, 1991 (#91000814)	248 SW Kingston Avenue; 45°31′18″N 122°42′23″W	
79	Halprin Open Space Sequence	Halprin Open Space Sequence	March 6, 2013 (#13000058)	Southwest open spaces and pedestrian malls between Lincoln and Clay Streets; 45°30′39″N 122°40′44″W	
80	Hamilton Building	Hamilton Building	March 17, 1977 (#77001112)	523–529 SW 3rd Avenue; 45°31′09″N 122°40′31″W	
81	Hanthorn Apartments	Hanthorn Apartments	August 25, 2014 (#14000846)	1125 SW 12th Avenue; 45°31′03″N 122°41′10″W	
82	Dr. Homer H. Harris House	Dr. Homer H. Harris House	March 7, 2017 (#100000725)	4116 SW Tualatin Avenue; 45°29′39″N 122°42′01″W	
83	Harrison Court Apartments	Harrison Court Apartments	October 19, 2005 (#05001179)	1834 SW 5th Avenue; 45°30′39″N 122°40′53″W	
84	Hawthorne Bridge	Hawthorne Bridge	November 14, 2012 (#12000932)	Spanning the Willamette River at river mile 13.1; 45°30′48″N 122°40′15″W	Part of the Willamette River Highway Bridges of Portland, Oregon MPS
85	Ernest Haycox Estate	Ernest Haycox Estate	January 28, 1994 (#93001565)	4700 SW Humphrey Boulevard; 45°30′17″N 122°43′30″W	
86	Heathman Hotel	Heathman Hotel	August 25, 2014 (#14000879)	723 SW Salmon Street; 45°31′04″N 122°40′53″W	Not to be confused with the current Heathman Hotel, which is also listed on the National Register, as the New Heathman Hotel.
87	Albert, Oscar, and Linda Heintz House	Albert, Oscar, and Linda Heintz House	October 17, 1990 (#90001508)	2556 SW Vista Avenue; 45°30′30″N 122°42′06″W	
88	C. K. Henry Building	C. K. Henry Building	May 13, 1982 (#82003743)	309 SW 4th Avenue; 45°31′16″N 122°40′32″W	
89	Levi Hexter House	Levi Hexter House	February 12, 1980 (#80003367)	2326 SW Park Place; 45°31′16″N 122°41′56″W	
90	Rufus C. Holman House	Rufus C. Holman House	February 22, 1991 (#91000147)	2116 SW Montgomery Drive; 45°30′44″N 122°41′58″W	
91	Holt–Saylor–Liberto House	Holt–Saylor–Liberto House	November 22, 1978 (#78002317)	3625 SW Condor Avenue; 45°29′49″N 122°40′45″W	
92	David T. and Nan Wood Honeyman House	David T. and Nan Wood Honeyman House	May 7, 1987 (#87000677)	1728 SW Prospect Drive; 45°31′02″N 122°41′52″W	
93	John S. Honeyman House	John S. Honeyman House	October 31, 1985 (#85003436)	1318 SW 12th Avenue; 45°30′58″N 122°41′10″W	
94	Hotel Alder	Hotel Alder	August 11, 2004 (#04000831)	415 SW Alder Street; 45°31′10″N 122°40′35″W	
95	Hotel Alma	Hotel Alma	September 9, 2009 (#09000706)	1201–1217 SW Harvey Milk Street; 45°31′22″N 122°41′00″W	
96	Hotel Ramapo (Note: Hotel Ramapo was previously listed on the National Register as "Franklin Hotel". Updated documentation accepted by the Keeper on January 2, 2013, showed that the "Franklin Hotel" name was in error; the building has never been referred to by that name. Accordingly the name listed on the National Register has been corrected.)	Hotel Ramapo	October 31, 1985 (#85003474)	1337 SW Washington Street; 45°31′21″N 122°41′06″W	
97	Hyland, Olive and Ellsworth Apartments	Hyland, Olive and Ellsworth Apartments	February 1, 1980 (#80004548)	1424–1434 SW Morrison Street; 45°31′16″N 122°41′13″W	Constructed in 1905 during Portland's period of rapid growth around the Lewis and Clark Centennial Exposition, this was one of the city's earliest modern apartment buildings. The property is closely associated with three generations of the Bronaugh family, who were prominent in Oregon law and politics.
98	Imperial Garage	Imperial Garage	May 27, 1993 (#93000451)	200–218 SW 4th Avenue; 45°31′17″N 122°40′28″W	
99	Imperial Hotel	Imperial Hotel	December 2, 1985 (#85003037)	422–426 SW Broadway; 45°31′15″N 122°40′42″W	
100	Josef Jacobberger House	Josef Jacobberger House	March 9, 1990 (#90000369)	1502 SW Upper Hall Street; 45°30′45″N 122°41′31″W	
101	W. Leland James House	W. Leland James House	May 23, 2016 (#16000291)	5303 SW Westwood View; 45°29′05″N 122°41′25″W	
102	Jeanne Manor Apartment Building	Jeanne Manor Apartment Building	March 5, 1998 (#98000201)	1431 SW Park Avenue; 45°30′53″N 122°41′03″W	
103	Jewish Shelter Home	Jewish Shelter Home	June 14, 1984 (#84003083)	4133 S Corbett Avenue; 45°29′36″N 122°40′35″W	
104	Dr. Noble Wiley Jones House	Dr. Noble Wiley Jones House	February 11, 1988 (#88000088)	2187 SW Market Street Drive; 45°31′07″N 122°41′49″W	
105	Victor H. and Marta Jorgensen House	Victor H. and Marta Jorgensen House	May 15, 2008 (#08000405)	2643 SW Buena Vista Drive; 45°30′32″N 122°42′15″W	
106	Journal Building	Journal Building	September 12, 1996 (#96000995)	806–818 SW Broadway; 45°31′06″N 122°40′47″W	
107	Jacob Kamm House	Jacob Kamm House	November 5, 1974 (#74001708)	1425 SW 20th Avenue; 45°31′04″N 122°41′42″W	
108	John A. and Hattie Mae Keating House	John A. and Hattie Mae Keating House	February 28, 2020 (#100005019)	2531 SW St. Helens Court; 45°30′35″N 122°42′07″W	
109	Grace Kern House	Grace Kern House	January 9, 2008 (#07001378)	1740 SW West Point Court; 45°30′59″N 122°41′49″W	
110	Kiernan House	Kiernan House	March 18, 2019 (#100003460)	1020 SW Cheltenham Court; 45°28′54″N 122°41′29″W	Settlement-era Dwellings, Barns and Farm Groups of the Willamette Valley, Oregon MPS
111	Samuel W. King House	Samuel W. King House	September 8, 1987 (#87001471)	1060 SW King Avenue; 45°31′13″N 122°41′43″W	
112	King's Hill Historic District	King's Hill Historic District	February 19, 1991 (#91000039)	Roughly bounded by W Burnside Street, SW Canyon Road, SW 21st Avenue, and Washington Park; 45°31′17″N 122°41′51″W	
113	Edward D. Kingsley House	Edward D. Kingsley House	February 23, 1990 (#90000283)	2132 SW Montgomery Drive; 45°30′43″N 122°41′59″W	
114	Dr. Frank B. Kistner House	Dr. Frank B. Kistner House	April 30, 1987 (#87000681)	5400 SW Hewett Boulevard; 45°30′07″N 122°43′58″W	
115	Moses and Ida Kline House	Moses and Ida Kline House	August 11, 2004 (#04000830)	2233 SW 18th Avenue; 45°30′37″N 122°41′48″W	
116	Kress Building	Kress Building	September 12, 1996 (#96000994)	638 SW 5th Avenue; 45°31′08″N 122°40′38″W	
117	Ladd Carriage House	Ladd Carriage House	January 7, 2010 (Note: The Ladd Carriage House was originally listed on the National Register on February 12, 1980. It was delisted on January 4, 2008 due to a temporary relocation to accommodate construction of underground parking in 2007. After a successful conclusion to the temporary relocation, substantially retaining the carriage house's historic integrity on its original site, it was relisted on January 7, 2010.) (#09001211)	1331 SW Broadway; 45°30′54″N 122°40′56″W	
118	Alexander and Cornelia Lewthwaite House	Alexander and Cornelia Lewthwaite House	January 18, 2006 (#05001539)	1715 SW Montgomery Drive; 45°31′01″N 122°41′47″W	
119	H. Liebes and Company Building	H. Liebes and Company Building	September 12, 1996 (#96000993)	625 SW Broadway; 45°31′11″N 122°40′47″W	
120	Lipman–Wolfe and Company Building	Lipman–Wolfe and Company Building	September 8, 1988 (#88001531)	521 SW 5th Avenue; 45°31′12″N 122°40′38″W	
121	A. G. Long House	A. G. Long House	September 9, 1993 (#93000917)	1987 SW 16th Avenue; 45°30′43″N 122°41′37″W	This 1908 house is perhaps the finest example of residential Colonial Revival architecture from the years soon after the style was introduced to Portland. It is additionally notable for its unusual admixture of Craftsman elements to the overall Colonial form, especially on the interior.
122	Lumbermen's Building	Lumbermen's Building	September 12, 1996 (#96000992)	333 SW 5th Avenue; 45°31′16″N 122°40′36″W	
123	Matthew J. and Florence Lynch House and Garden	Matthew J. and Florence Lynch House and Garden	September 15, 2002 (#02000674)	337 SW Kingston Avenue; 45°31′15″N 122°42′26″W	
124	W. R. Mackenzie House	W. R. Mackenzie House	November 28, 1978 (#78002319)	1131 SW King Avenue; 45°31′12″N 122°41′45″W	
125	William and Annie MacMaster House	William and Annie MacMaster House	October 30, 1989 (#89001862)	1041 SW Vista Avenue; 45°31′14″N 122°41′55″W	
126	A. H. Maegly House	A. H. Maegly House	December 2, 1981 (#81000518)	226 SW Kingston Avenue; 45°31′20″N 122°42′23″W	
127	Daniel J. Malarkey House	Daniel J. Malarkey House	May 27, 1993 (#93000450)	2141 SW Hillcrest Place; 45°30′27″N 122°42′10″W	This was the home of noted legislator and trial lawyer Dan Malarkey (1870–1939) from its construction in 1909 until his death. Associated with Progressive causes, Malarkey presided over the Oregon Senate during its 1913 session, when the legislature passed landmark bills establishing a minimum wage and regulating public utilities. In private legal practice, he played a key part in the ultimately successful battle against the 1922 Oregon School Law.
128	Herbert and Elizabeth Malarkey House	Herbert and Elizabeth Malarkey House	August 4, 2005 (#05000827)	1717 SW Elm Street; 45°30′34″N 122°41′46″W	
129	Mallory Hotel	Mallory Hotel	May 19, 2006 (#06000406)	729 SW 15th Avenue; 45°31′15″N 122°41′16″W	
130	William F. Mangels Four-Row Carousel	William F. Mangels Four-Row Carousel	August 26, 1987 (#87001383)	4033 SW Canyon Road; 45°30′38″N 122°43′05″W	As of 2013, the carousel is no longer located at these coordinates or address.
131	Markle–Pittock House	Markle–Pittock House	February 28, 1985 (#85000368)	1816 SW Hawthorne Terrace; 45°30′27″N 122°41′55″W	
132	Morris Marks House	Morris Marks House	December 30, 1975 (#75001596)	1501 SW Harrison Street; 45°30′49″N 122°41′30″W	
133	Marquam Manor	Marquam Manor	May 27, 1993 (#93000449)	3211 SW 10th Avenue; 45°29′58″N 122°41′26″W	
134	Medical Arts Building	Medical Arts Building	November 6, 1986 (#86002968)	1020 SW Taylor Street; 45°31′07″N 122°41′00″W	
135	Meier & Frank Building	Meier & Frank Building	July 8, 1982 (#82003744)	621 SW 5th Avenue; 45°31′09″N 122°40′41″W	
136	L. B. Menefee House	L. B. Menefee House	October 30, 1989 (#89001866)	1634 SW Myrtle Street; 45°30′37″N 122°41′41″W	
137	Mohawk Building	Mohawk Building	September 12, 1996 (#96001002)	708–724 SW 3rd Avenue; 45°31′04″N 122°40′31″W	
138	Morgan Building	Morgan Building	September 12, 1996 (#96001003)	720 SW Washington Street; 45°31′14″N 122°40′46″W	
139	Morrison Bridge	Morrison Bridge	November 14, 2012 (#12000933)	Spanning the Willamette River at river mile 12.8; 45°31′04″N 122°40′11″W	Part of the Willamette River Highway Bridges of Portland, Oregon MPS
140	Multnomah County Courthouse	Multnomah County Courthouse	June 11, 1979 (#79002136)	1021 SW 4th Avenue; 45°30′59″N 122°40′42″W	
141	Multnomah Hotel	Multnomah Hotel	February 28, 1985 (#85000369)	319 SW Pine Street; 45°31′19″N 122°40′27″W	
142	Multnomah School	Multnomah School	March 4, 2020 (#100005016)	7688 SW Capitol Highway; 45°28′06″N 122°42′36″W	
143	Neighborhood House	Neighborhood House	July 10, 1979 (#79003737)	3030 SW 2nd Avenue; 45°30′04″N 122°40′46″W	
144	Neighbors of Woodcraft Building	Neighbors of Woodcraft Building	February 22, 1996 (#96000123)	1410–1412 SW Morrison Street; 45°31′15″N 122°41′12″W	
145	New Fliedner Building	New Fliedner Building	October 26, 2020 (#100005725)	1017 SW Washington Street; 45°31′18″N 122°40′54″W	
146	New Heathman Hotel	New Heathman Hotel	February 16, 1984 (#84003087)	712 SW Salmon Street; 45°31′02″N 122°40′52″W	
147	New Imperial Hotel	New Imperial Hotel	October 24, 2003 (#03001068)	400 SW Broadway; 45°31′16″N 122°40′42″W	
148	Nicholas–Lang House	Nicholas–Lang House	March 13, 1979 (#79002137)	2030 SW Vista Avenue; 45°30′44″N 122°41′50″W	
149	Dr. A. S. Nichols House	Dr. A. S. Nichols House	March 5, 1992 (#92000090)	1961 SW Vista Avenue; 45°30′47″N 122°41′51″W	
150	Dr. Herbert S. Nichols House	Dr. Herbert S. Nichols House	June 1, 1990 (#90000829)	1925 SW Vista Avenue; 45°30′48″N 122°41′51″W	
151	Northwestern National Bank Building	Northwestern National Bank Building	September 12, 1996 (#96001001)	621 SW Morrison Street; 45°31′09″N 122°40′44″W	
152	Odd Fellows Building	Odd Fellows Building	October 24, 1980 (#80003372)	1001–1019 SW 10th Avenue; 45°31′04″N 122°41′01″W	
153	Olds, Wortman and King Department Store	Olds, Wortman and King Department Store	February 20, 1991 (#91000057)	921 SW Morrison Street; 45°31′13″N 122°40′53″W	
154	Pacific Building	Pacific Building	March 5, 1992 (#92000091)	520 SW Yamhill Street; 45°31′05″N 122°40′43″W	
155	Paramount Theatre	Paramount Theatre	April 22, 1976 (#76001585)	1037 SW Broadway; 45°31′01″N 122°40′53″W	
156	Peck Bros. and Bartle Tire Service Company Building	Peck Bros. and Bartle Tire Service Company Building	February 27, 2003 (#03000072)	900 SW 13th Avenue; 45°31′09″N 122°41′09″W	
157	Louis Pfunder House	Louis Pfunder House	June 10, 2005 (#05000574)	2211 SW Vista Avenue; 45°30′40″N 122°41′54″W	
158	Charles Piggott House	Charles Piggott House	March 28, 1979 (#79002139)	2591 SW Buckingham Avenue; 45°30′23″N 122°41′14″W	
159	Pioneer Courthouse	Pioneer Courthouse	March 20, 1973 (#73001582)	520 SW Morrison Street; 45°31′07″N 122°40′42″W	Built in 1875 and restored in the 1970s, this was one of the first monumental buildings in the Pacific Northwest. It has served as a U.S. courthouse, a customhouse, and a post office. It underwent another rehabilitation in the 2000s.
160	George Pipes House	George Pipes House	February 22, 1991 (#91000131)	2526 SW St. Helens Court; 45°30′35″N 122°42′06″W	
161	Martin Luther Pipes House	Martin Luther Pipes House	March 6, 1987 (#87000310)	2675 SW Vista Avenue; 45°30′23″N 122°42′15″W	
162	Pittock Block	Pittock Block	September 8, 1987 (#87001507)	921 SW Washington Street; 45°31′17″N 122°40′51″W	
163	Portland (steam tug)	Portland (steam tug)	August 14, 1997 (#97000847)	Berthed on the Willamette River at the foot of SW Pine Street; 45°31′12″N 122°40′11″W	
164	Portland Art Museum	Portland Art Museum	December 31, 1974 (#74001710)	1219 SW Park Avenue; 45°30′58″N 122°41′01″W	
165	Portland City Hall	Portland City Hall	November 21, 1974 (#74001711)	1220 SW 5th Avenue; 45°30′54″N 122°40′45″W	
166	Portland Garden Club	Portland Garden Club	October 7, 2005 (#05001151)	1132 SW Vista Avenue; 45°31′12″N 122°41′52″W	
167	Portland Police Block	Portland Police Block	June 6, 1985 (#85001185)	209 SW Oak Street; 45°31′15″N 122°40′24″W	Boundary decrease approved April 3, 2020.
168	Portland Public Service Building	Portland Public Service Building	October 25, 2011 (#11000770)	1120 SW 5th Avenue; 45°30′56″N 122°40′43″W	Commonly known as the Portland Building
169	Portland Skidmore/Old Town Historic District	Portland Skidmore/Old Town Historic District	December 6, 1975 (#75001597)	Roughly bounded by the Willamette River, (Note: The Portland Skidmore/Old Town Historic District's National Register nomination form states that the east boundary of the district is Harbor Drive, a thoroughfare which was removed subsequent to the district's listing on the National Register. The Willamette River is used here as an approximation of the alignment of Harbor Drive.) NW Everett Street, NW/SW 3rd Avenue, and SW Oak Street; 45°31′23″N 122°40′18″W	One of the most impressive historic commercial districts on the West Coast, this is where Portland began and first flourished. The buildings, which date from the mid-to-late-19th century, were built in a variety of High Victorian architectural styles, and many feature cast iron fronts. Also extends into Northwest Portland.
170	Portland Yamhill Historic District	Portland Yamhill Historic District	July 30, 1976 (#76001587)	Roughly bounded by SW Taylor and Morrison Streets, SW 2nd Avenue, and the Willamette River; 45°31′01″N 122°40′26″W	
171	Portland Zoo Railway Historic District	Portland Zoo Railway Historic District	March 5, 2020 (#100005018)	4001 SW Canyon Road; 45°30′40″N 122°42′37″W	
172	Postal Building	Postal Building	March 14, 1978 (#78002321)	502–513 SW 3rd Avenue; 45°31′09″N 122°40′28″W	
173	Ira F. Powers Building	Ira F. Powers Building	December 2, 1985 (#85003082)	804–810 SW 3rd Avenue; 45°31′02″N 122°40′32″W	
174	O. L. Price House	O. L. Price House	August 11, 1988 (#88001242)	2681 SW Buena Vista Drive; 45°30′34″N 122°42′16″W	
175	Public Service Building and Garage	Public Service Building and Garage	September 12, 1996 (#96000998)	920 SW 6th Avenue; 45°31′02″N 122°40′44″W	
176	Railway Exchange Building and Huber's Restaurant	Railway Exchange Building and Huber's Restaurant	March 13, 1979 (#79002132)	320 SW Harvey Milk Street; 45°31′13″N 122°40′30″W	
177	Rosamond Coursen and Walter R. Reed House	Rosamond Coursen and Walter R. Reed House	February 23, 1990 (#90000288)	2036–2038 SW Main Street; 45°31′12″N 122°41′41″W	
178	Samuel G. Reed House	Samuel G. Reed House	October 17, 1990 (#90001516)	2615 SW Vista Avenue; 45°30′31″N 122°42′12″W	
179	Roosevelt Hotel	Roosevelt Hotel	March 5, 1998 (#98000211)	1005 SW Park Avenue; 45°31′04″N 122°40′57″W	
180	Dr. J. J. Rosenberg House	Dr. J. J. Rosenberg House	June 1, 1990 (#90000828)	1792 SW Montgomery Drive; 45°30′56″N 122°41′50″W	
181	Dr. James Rosenfeld House	Dr. James Rosenfeld House	February 23, 1989 (#89000060)	2125 SW 21st Avenue; 45°30′43″N 122°41′57″W	
182	St. James Lutheran Church	St. James Lutheran Church	May 21, 1975 (#75001598)	1315 SW Park Avenue; 45°30′56″N 122°41′01″W	
183	Charles J. and Elsa Schnabel House	Charles J. and Elsa Schnabel House	September 8, 1987 (#87001496)	2375 SW Park Place; 45°31′17″N 122°41′59″W	
184	Maurice Seitz House	Maurice Seitz House	October 17, 1990 (#90001515)	1495 SW Clifton Street; 45°30′39″N 122°41′33″W	
185	Selling Building	Selling Building	October 17, 1991 (#91001554)	610 SW Alder Street; 45°31′10″N 122°40′43″W	
186	Seward Hotel	Seward Hotel	February 28, 1985 (#85000370)	611–619 SW 10th Avenue; 45°31′14″N 122°40′56″W	Building currently serves as the east wing of the Sentinel Hotel.
187	Sherlock Building	Sherlock Building	October 20, 1977 (#77001111)	320 SW Oak Street; 45°31′15″N 122°40′28″W	
188	Alfred H. and Mary E. Smith House	Alfred H. and Mary E. Smith House	September 6, 2007 (#07000926)	1806 SW High Street; 45°30′25″N 122°41′56″W	
189	Milton W. Smith House	Milton W. Smith House	January 11, 1980 (#80004547)	3434 S Kelly Avenue; 45°29′53″N 122°40′28″W	
190	Walter V. Smith House	Walter V. Smith House	February 19, 1993 (#93000020)	1943 SW Montgomery Drive; 45°30′49″N 122°41′55″W	
191	South Park Blocks	South Park Blocks	March 23, 2022 (#100007518)	1003 SW Park Ave. 45°31′04″N 122°40′56″W	
192	South Portland Historic District	South Portland Historic District	July 31, 1998 (#98000951)	Roughly Bounded by SW Arthur Street, S Naito Parkway, S Grover Street, S Hood Avenue, S Curry Street, and SW Barbur Boulevard; 45°29′58″N 122°40′44″W	
193	Sovereign Hotel	Sovereign Hotel	December 2, 1981 (#81000520)	710–716 SW Madison Street; 45°30′57″N 122°40′54″W	
194	Spalding Building	Spalding Building	October 7, 1982 (#82001513)	311–319 SW Washington Street; 45°31′11″N 122°40′30″W	
195	Arthur Champlin and Margaret Fenton Spencer House	Arthur Champlin and Margaret Fenton Spencer House	August 5, 1999 (#99000942)	1812 SW Myrtle Street; 45°30′38″N 122°41′48″W	
196	Stevens Building	Stevens Building	March 5, 1998 (#98000213)	812 SW Washington Street; 45°31′15″N 122°40′49″W	
197	Stratton–Cornelius House	Stratton–Cornelius House	March 8, 1978 (#78002322)	2182 SW Yamhill Street; 45°31′20″N 122°41′47″W	
198	Alice Henderson Strong House	Alice Henderson Strong House	October 17, 1990 (#90001520)	2241 SW Montgomery Drive; 45°30′43″N 122°42′04″W	
199	Swetland Building	Swetland Building	April 24, 2007 (#07000367)	500 SW 5th Avenue; 45°31′12″N 122°40′36″W	
200	Peter Taylor House and Gotlieb Haehlen House	Peter Taylor House and Gotlieb Haehlen House	August 1, 1984 (#84003091)	2806–2818 SW 1st Avenue; 45°30′10″N 122°40′42″W	
201	Telegram Building	Telegram Building	January 28, 1994 (#93001560)	1101–1117 SW Washington Street; 45°31′19″N 122°40′57″W	
202	Terminal Sales Building	Terminal Sales Building	October 17, 1991 (#91001555)	1220 SW Morrison Street; 45°31′14″N 122°41′05″W	
203	Terwilliger Parkway	Terwilliger Parkway	March 1, 2021 (#100006188)	3000 SW Terwilliger Blvd. 45°30′09″N 122°41′00″W	
204	Abraham Tichner House	Abraham Tichner House	August 23, 2000 (#00001022)	114 SW Kingston Avenue; 45°31′24″N 122°42′23″W	
205	The Town Club	The Town Club	March 6, 1987 (#87000328)	2115 SW Salmon Street; 45°31′16″N 122°41′41″W	
206	U.S. Courthouse	U.S. Courthouse	April 30, 1979 (#79002142)	620 SW Main Street; 45°30′58″N 122°40′51″W	
207	United States National Bank Building	United States National Bank Building	October 9, 1986 (#86002842)	321–331 SW 6th Avenue; 45°31′17″N 122°40′40″W	
208	University Club	University Club	July 26, 1979 (#79002144)	1225 SW 6th Avenue; 45°30′55″N 122°40′52″W	
209	Villa St. Clara Apartments	Villa St. Clara Apartments	May 5, 2000 (#00000449)	909 SW 12th Avenue; 45°31′09″N 122°41′07″W	
210	Visitors Information Center	Visitors Information Center	September 24, 2010 (#10000801)	1020 SW Naito Parkway; 45°30′54″N 122°40′24″W	In this, his only major non-residential commission, master architect John Yeon combined the principles of the International style with strong influences of the Northwest Regional style, which he pioneered. Northwest Regional elements include the naturally-inspired color scheme, the use of plywood walls and louvered ventilation panels, and concern for the site's unique views.
211	Vista Avenue Viaduct	Vista Avenue Viaduct	April 26, 1984 (#84003093)	1200 SW Vista Avenue; 45°31′09″N 122°41′52″W	
212	Waldo Block	Waldo Block	April 29, 1982 (#82003746)	431–433 SW 2nd Avenue; 45°31′10″N 122°40′26″W	
213	Washington Park Reservoirs Historic District	Washington Park Reservoirs Historic District	January 15, 2004 (#03001447)	2403–2404 SW Jefferson Street; 45°31′11″N 122°42′10″W	
214	Aubrey R. Watzek House	Aubrey R. Watzek House	November 1, 1974 (#74001715)	1061 SW Skyline Boulevard; 45°30′54″N 122°43′41″W	1937 John Yeon house combined International Style with regional tastes to create Northwest Regional style
215	Wells Fargo Building	Wells Fargo Building	October 9, 1986 (#86002839)	309–319 SW 6th Avenue; 45°31′18″N 122°40′39″W	
216	William Bittle Wells House	William Bittle Wells House	June 16, 1989 (#89000519)	1515 SW Clifton Street; 45°30′40″N 122°41′36″W	
217	Wheeldon Annex	Wheeldon Annex	March 4, 2020 (#100005015)	929–935 SW Salmon Street; 45°31′05″N 122°40′58″W	
218	Wheeldon Apartment Building	Wheeldon Apartment Building	October 25, 1990 (#90001591)	910 SW Park Avenue; 45°31′05″N 122°40′52″W	
219	Cora Bryant Wheeler House	Cora Bryant Wheeler House	February 23, 1990 (#90000295)	1841 SW Montgomery Drive; 45°30′53″N 122°41′53″W	Architect A. E. Doyle designed this 1923 Arts and Crafts house, with its complex lines and massing, to take full advantage of its prominent and demanding ridgetop location. The Wheeler House became an important later addition to the portfolio that made Doyle one of Portland's leading architects. Junior partner Pietro Belluschi and apprentice Richard Sundeleaf provided on-site construction supervision.
220	James E. Wheeler House	James E. Wheeler House	October 17, 1990 (#90001518)	2417 SW 16th Avenue; 45°30′31″N 122°41′44″W	
221	Catherine White House	Catherine White House	March 10, 1983 (#83002176)	1924 SW 14th Avenue; 45°30′43″N 122°41′27″W	
222	Whitney and Gray Building and Jake's Famous Crawfish Restaurant	Whitney and Gray Building and Jake's Famous Crawfish Restaurant	August 11, 1983 (#83002177)	401–409 SW 12th Avenue; 45°31′21″N 122°41′01″W	
223	Wilcox Building	Wilcox Building	February 23, 1989 (#89000058)	506 SW 6th Avenue; 45°31′13″N 122°40′39″W	
224	Woodlark Building	Woodlark Building	August 8, 2014 (#14000482)	813–817 SW Alder Street; 45°31′14″N 122°40′50″W	
225	H. C. Wortman House	H. C. Wortman House	August 11, 1988 (#88001245)	1111 SW Vista Avenue; 45°31′13″N 122°41′55″W	
226	Yeon Building	Yeon Building	January 21, 1994 (#93001497)	520–530 SW 5th Avenue; 45°31′10″N 122°40′36″W	
227	John Eben Young House	John Eben Young House	August 25, 1988 (#88001312)	916 SW King Avenue; 45°31′18″N 122°41′43″W	
228	Walter S. Zimmerman House	Walter S. Zimmerman House	February 28, 1991 (#91000141)	1840 SW Hawthorne Terrace; 45°30′28″N 122°41′57″W	Architect Wade Hampton Pipes (1877–1961) was the most prominent advocate of the English Arts and Crafts movement in Oregon during his active career (beginning 1911). This 1931 house, designed for logging and railway businessman Walter Zimmerman, represents a transitional step in the evolution of Pipes's work, moving from traditional stucco walls to brick and adding other modern details.
229	Zion Lutheran Church	Zion Lutheran Church	March 8, 1996 (#96000169)	1015 SW 18th Avenue; 45°31′11″N 122°41′31″W	Master architect Pietro Belluschi employed a number of innovations in this 1950 church, a pioneering example of the application of modern architectural principles to a religious building. Using local materials, influences, and artists and craftsmen, it represents the Northwest Regional style of modern architecture, which Belluschi helped develop.

== Former listings ==
	Name on the Register	Image	Date listed	Date removed	Location	Description
1	Canterbury Castle	Canterbury Castle	September 8, 1987 (#87001509)	October 13, 2010	2910 SW Canterbury Lane (former)	This 1931 house was designed by J.O. Frye to resemble Canterbury Castle in England on the exterior, and to evoke the Art Deco styling of Hollywood of the 1920s on the interior. It was demolished in 2009 after failing to meet municipal safety codes.
2	Espey Boarding House		September 19, 1979 (#79002131)	April 14, 1989	2601-2605 SW Water Ave.	Demolished in November 1988.
3	Edward Knox Haseltine House		November 15, 1984 (#84000481)	December 28, 1994	1616 SW Spring Street (former)	Demolished on July 5, 1994.
4	Edward C. Hochapfel House		August 11, 1983 (#83002171)	May 20, 2003	1520 SW 11th Ave.	Demolished on November 1, 2000.
5	Jefferson Substation	Jefferson Substation	May 31, 1980 (#80003368)	April 5, 2021	37 SW Jefferson Street; 45°30′50″N 122°40′31″W	
6	Knights of Columbus Building		June 1, 1990 (#90000830)	March 18, 1998	804 SW Taylor Street (former)	Demolished in 1997.

== See also ==
- National Register of Historic Places listings in Oregon
- National Register of Historic Places listings in Multnomah County, Oregon
- Listings in neighboring counties: Clackamas, Clark, Columbia, Hood River, Skamania, Washington
- List of National Historic Landmarks in Oregon
- Historic preservation
- History of Portland, Oregon
- Lists of Oregon-related topics
