= Villa St. Clara Apartments =

Historic building in Portland, Oregon, U.S.

- U.S. National Register of Historic Places
- Portland Historic Landmark
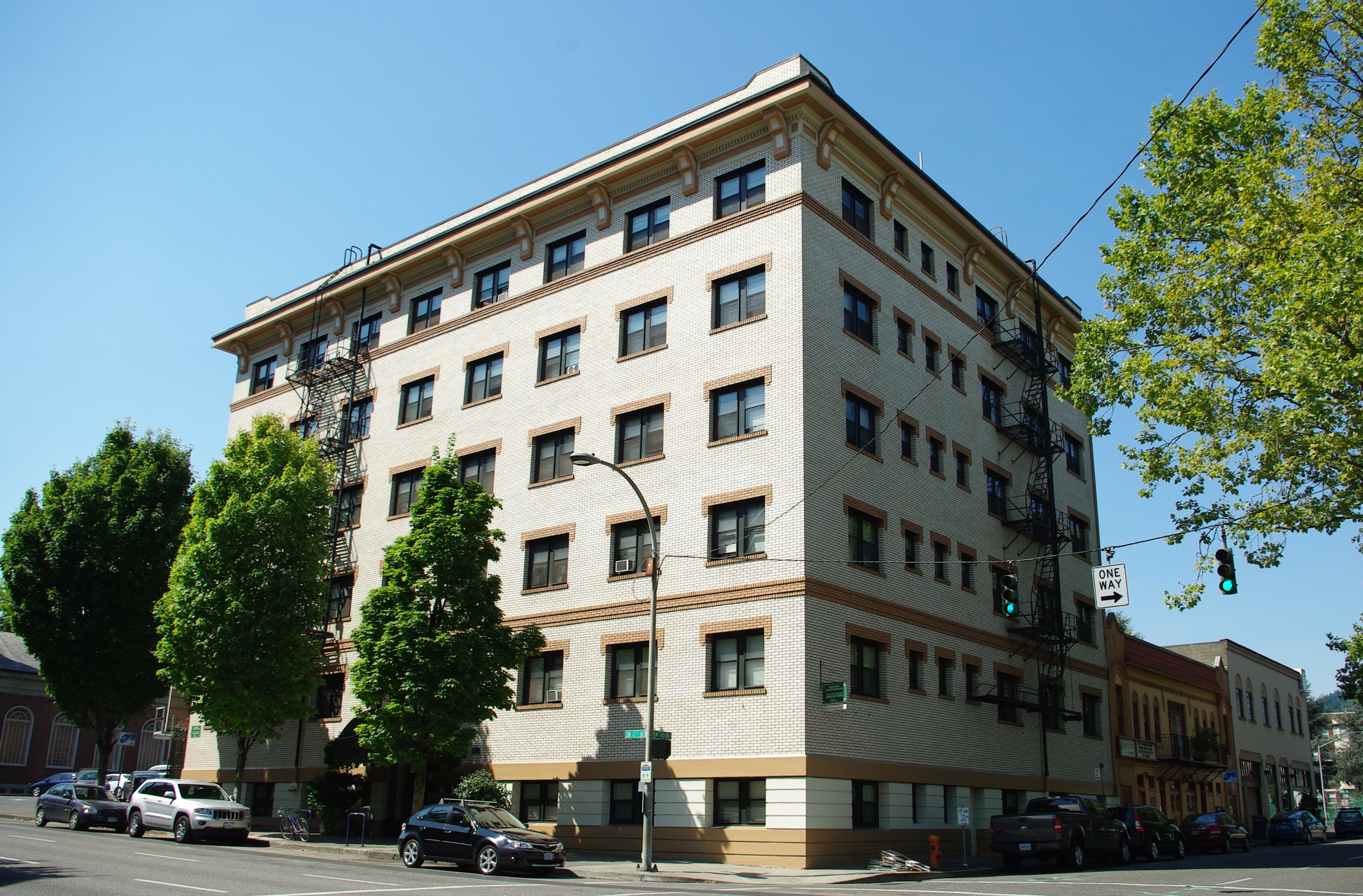
- The building in 2012

- Location within Portland, Oregon Location within Oregon Location within the United States
- Location: 909 SW 12th Avenue; Portland, Oregon
- Coordinates: 45°31′09″N 122°41′07″W
- Area: less than one acre
- Built: 1911
- Architect: Benchly, Frank
- Architectural style: Renaissance
- NRHP reference No.: 00000449
- Added to NRHP: May 5, 2000

The Villa St. Clara Apartments is a building complex located in southwest Portland, Oregon listed on the National Register of Historic Places.

== See also ==
- National Register of Historic Places listings in Southwest Portland, Oregon
