= Holt–Saylor–Liberto House =

Historic building in Portland, Oregon, U.S.

- Holt-Saylor-Liberto House
- U.S. National Register of Historic Places
- Portland Historic Landmark
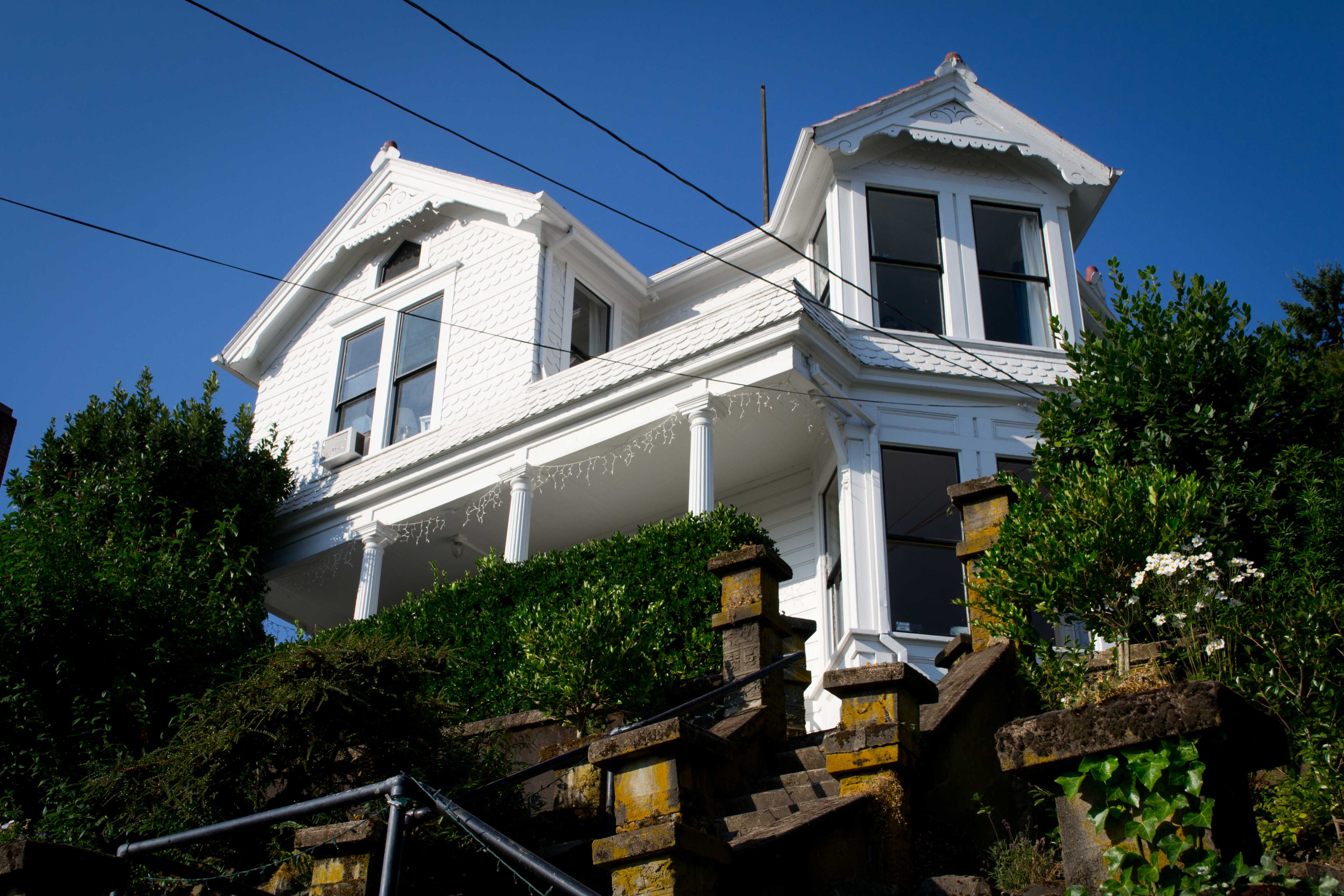

- Location within Portland, Oregon
- Location: 3625 SW Condor Avenue; Portland, Oregon
- Coordinates: 45°29′49″N 122°40′45″W
- Area: 0.2 acres (0.081 ha)
- Built: 1888
- Architectural style: Queen Anne
- NRHP reference No.: 78002317
- Added to NRHP: November 22, 1978

The Holt–Saylor–Liberto House is a house located in southwest Portland, Oregon, that is listed on the National Register of Historic Places. It was added to the register in 1978. Earlier, it was designated a Portland Historic Landmark by the city's Historic Landmarks Commission, in October 1977.

== See also ==
- National Register of Historic Places listings in Southwest Portland, Oregon
