= Harrison Court Apartments =

Historic building in Portland, Oregon, U.S.

- U.S. National Register of Historic Places
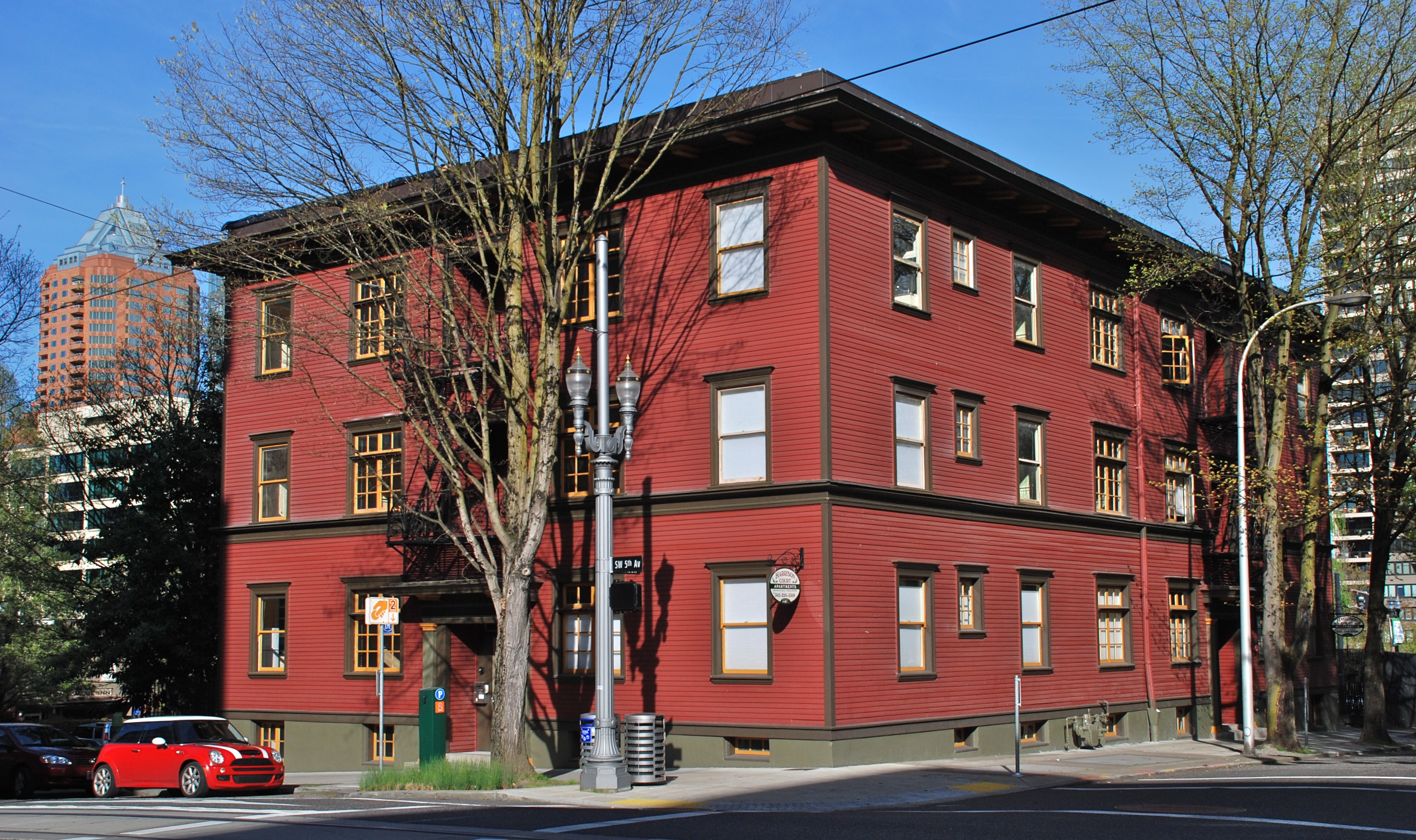
- The complex's exterior in 2012

- Location within Portland, Oregon Location within Oregon Location within the United States
- Location: 1834 SW 5th Avenue; Portland, Oregon
- Coordinates: 45°30′39″N 122°40′53″W
- Area: less than one acre
- Built: 1905
- Architectural style: Colonial Revival
- NRHP reference No.: 05001179
- Added to NRHP: October 19, 2005

The Harrison Court Apartments is a building complex located in downtown Portland, Oregon, listed on the National Register of Historic Places.

Originally with twenty units with a total of sixty rooms, it currently consists of studio, one, and two bedroom units ranging in size from 500 to 850 square feet. While the National Register nomination does not list an architect, a contemporary Oregonian article illustrated the newly opened building reveals that the architect was Eric Hendricks who later became associated with John V. Bennes to form the firm Bennes & Hendricks.

== See also ==
- National Register of Historic Places listings in Southwest Portland, Oregon
