= Edward C. Hochapfel House =

Former building in Portland, Oregon, U.S.

- Formerly listed on the U.S. National Register of Historic Places
- Location within Portland, Oregon Location within Oregon Location within the United States
- Location: 1520 Southwest 11th Avenue, Portland, Oregon
- Coordinates: 45.5147°N 122.6861°W
- Built: 1904
- Architect: Justus F. Krumbein
- Architectural style: Bungalow/American Craftsman, Colonial Revival
- NRHP reference No.: 83002171

Significant dates
- Added to NRHP: August 11, 1983
- Removed from NRHP: May 20, 2003

The Edward C. Hochapfel House, also known as the Marandas Apartments, was an historic building located at 1520 Southwest 11th Avenue, in Portland, Oregon. The structure was completed in 1904 and exhibited Bungalow/American Craftsman and Colonial Revival architecture. It was added to the National Register of Historic Places in August 1983, but later demolished.

== See also ==
- National Register of Historic Places listings in Southwest Portland, Oregon
