= Alice Druhot House =

Historic building in Portland, Oregon, U.S.

- U.S. National Register of Historic Places
- Portland Historic Landmark
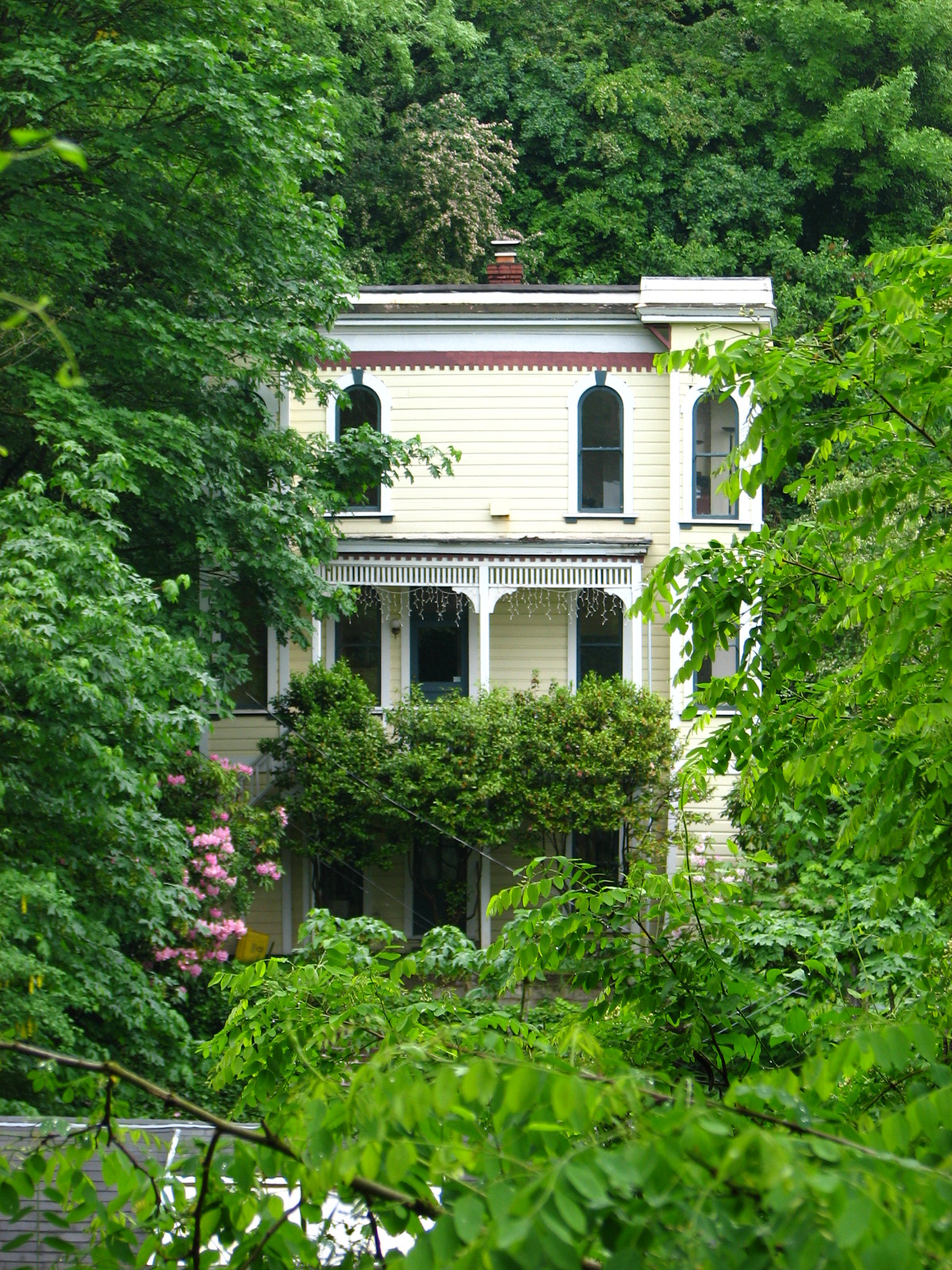
- Alice Druhot House in 2008

- Location within the United States Location within Oregon Location within Portland, Oregon
- Location: 1903 SW Cable Avenue; Portland, Oregon
- Coordinates: 45°30′52″N 122°41′42″W
- Area: less than one acre
- Built: 1891
- Architect: Arnold Druhot
- Architectural style: Italian Villa, Castellated
- NRHP reference No.: 88000079
- Added to NRHP: February 29, 1988

The Alice Druhot House, historically known as the "Cable House" is located in southwest Portland, Oregon and listed on the National Register of Historic Places due to its local relevance as a historical example of an Italian Villa in the castellated style. It is located in the Goose Hollow neighborhood.

The well-preserved Italianate residence now called the "Cable House" was built in 1891 at the base of Portland Heights. It sits on a small parcel of land, situated on a steep, brushy hillside of a small canyon in the Goose Hollow neighborhood of southwest Portland. It is one of three known castle-like houses in Portland, and the only one that is wood-framed. The Cable House is located just below Montgomery Drive and is oriented to the east with views of downtown Portland.

== See also ==
- National Register of Historic Places listings in Southwest Portland, Oregon
