= Edward Knox Haseltine House =

Historic building in Portland, Oregon, U.S.

- Formerly listed on the U.S. National Register of Historic Places
- Location within Oregon Location within the United States
- Location: 1616 SW Spring Street; Portland, Oregon
- Area: 0.2 acres (0.081 ha)
- Built: 1886
- Built by: Edward K. Haseltine
- Architectural style: Classical Revival, Italianate, Vernacular Classical Revival
- NRHP reference No.: 84000481

Significant dates
- Added to NRHP: November 15, 1984
- Removed from NRHP: December 28, 1994

The Edward Knox Haseltine House, located in Portland, Oregon, was added to the National Register of Historic Places on November 15, 1984. However, the site was delisted from the Register on December 28, 1994.

== See also ==
- National Register of Historic Places listings in Southwest Portland, Oregon
