= Espey Boarding House =

Former building in Portland, Oregon, U.S.

- Formerly listed on the U.S. National Register of Historic Places
- Location within Portland, Oregon Location within Oregon Location within the United States
- Location: 2601-2605 Southwest Water Avenue, Portland, Oregon
- Coordinates: 45.5043°N 122.6767°W
- Built: circa 1886
- Demolished: November 28, 1988
- NRHP reference No.: 79002131

Significant dates
- Added to NRHP: September 19, 1979
- Removed from NRHP: April 14, 1989

The Espey Boarding House, also known as the DeCicco Building, was an historic building located at 2601–2605 Southwest Water Avenue, in Portland, Oregon. The structure was completed c. 1886, and added to the National Register of Historic Places in 1979. It was razed on November 28, 1988.

== See also ==
- National Register of Historic Places listings in Southwest Portland, Oregon
