= Mohawk Building =

Historic building in Portland, Oregon, U.S.

- U.S. National Register of Historic Places
- Portland Historic Landmark
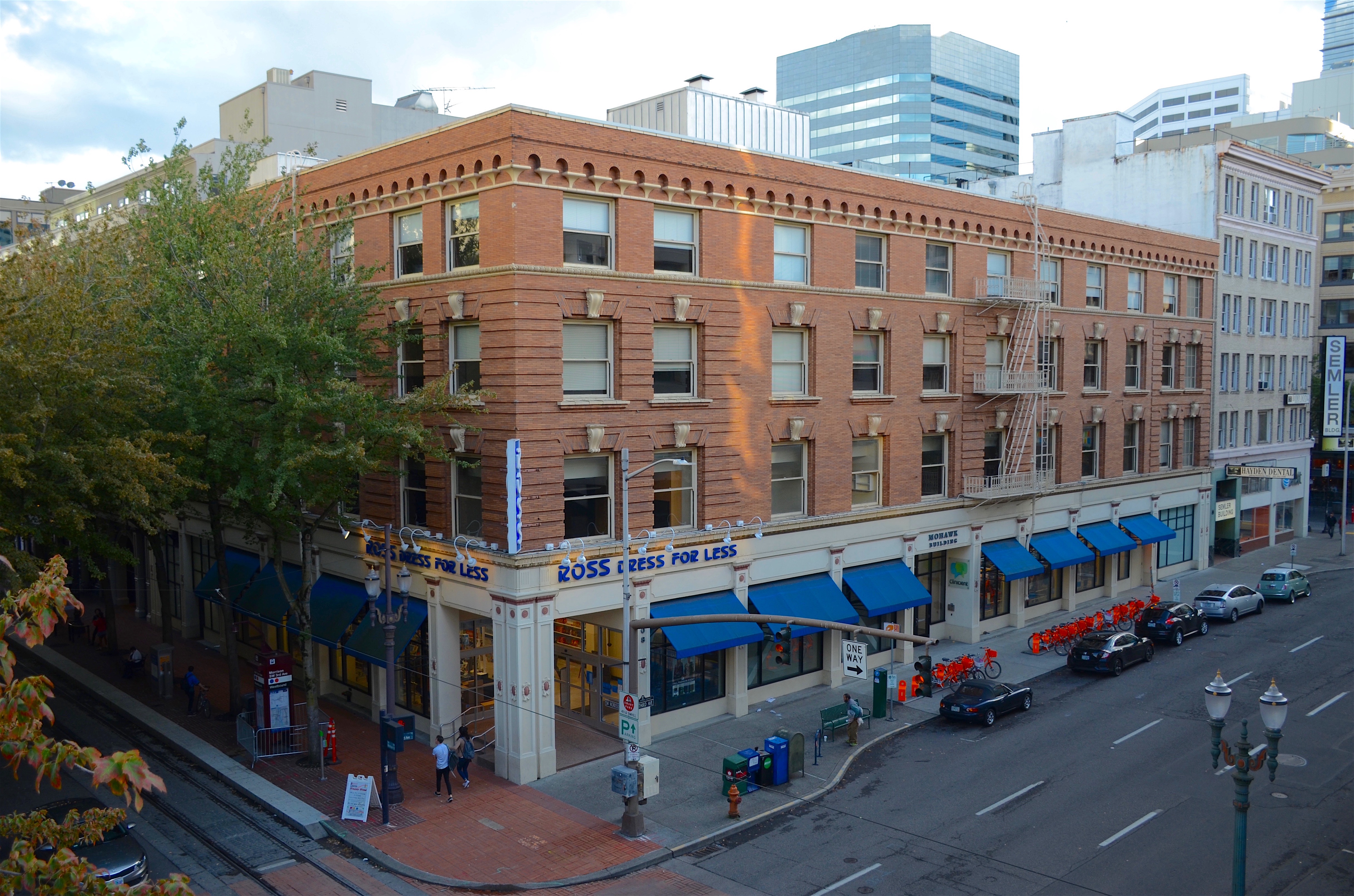
- The Mohawk Building in 2017

- Location within Portland, Oregon Location within Oregon Location within the United States
- Location: 708–724 SW 3rd Avenue; Portland, Oregon
- Coordinates: 45°31′05″N 122°40′31″W
- Built: 1903
- Architect: Whidden & Lewis
- Architectural style: Colonial Revival
- NRHP reference No.: 96001002
- Added to NRHP: September 12, 1996

The Mohawk Building is a building located in downtown Portland, Oregon, listed on the National Register of Historic Places.

== See also ==
- National Register of Historic Places listings in Southwest Portland, Oregon
