= Bronaugh Apartments =

Historic building in Portland, Oregon, U.S.

- Hyland, Olive and Ellsworth Apartments
- U.S. National Register of Historic Places
- Portland Historic Landmark
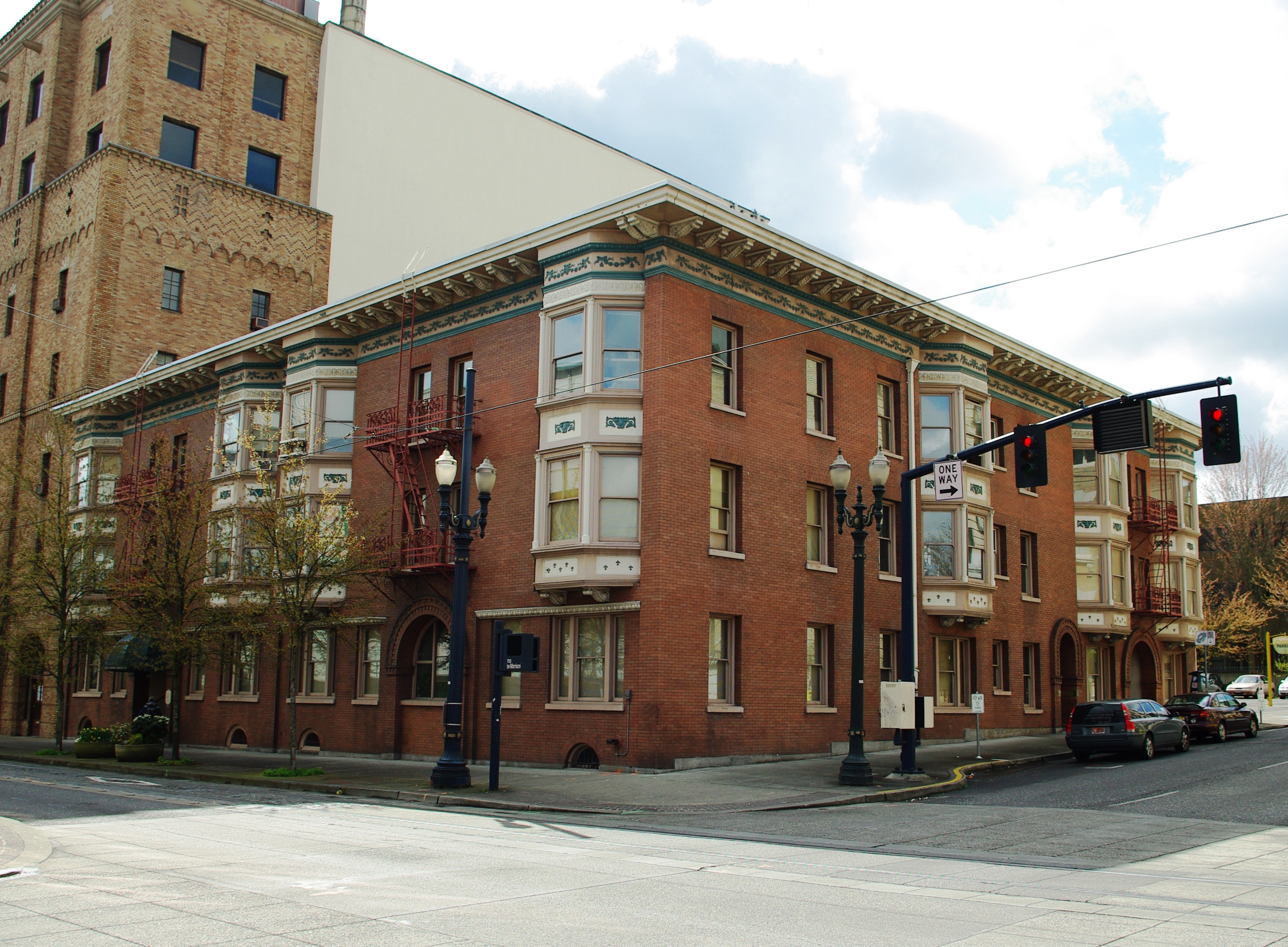
- The Bronaugh Apartments in 2010. The Olive sub-building is on the corner closest to the camera.

- Location within Portland, Oregon
- Location: 1424–1434 SW Morrison Street; Portland, Oregon
- Coordinates: 45°31′16″N 122°41′13″W
- Area: 0.23 acres (0.093 ha)
- Built: 1905
- Built by: James Isaac Marshall
- Architectural style: Italianate
- NRHP reference No.: 80004548
- Added to NRHP: February 1, 1980

The Bronaugh Apartments, also known as the Hyland Apartments, Olive Apartments, and Ellsworth Apartments (originally named as three component sub-buildings), are a historic building in Portland, Oregon, United States. Constructed for Araminta Payne Bronaugh in 1905 during Portland's period of rapid growth around the Lewis and Clark Centennial Exposition, it was one of the city's earliest modern apartment buildings, contrasting with the boarding houses that were already common. The property is closely associated with three generations of the Bronaugh family, who were prominent in Oregon law and politics, and who owned the building for nearly 50 years.

The building was added to the National Register of Historic Places in 1980.

== See also ==
- National Register of Historic Places listings in Southwest Portland, Oregon
