= Elm Street Apartments =

Historic building complex in Portland, Oregon, U.S.

- U.S. National Register of Historic Places
- Portland Historic Landmark
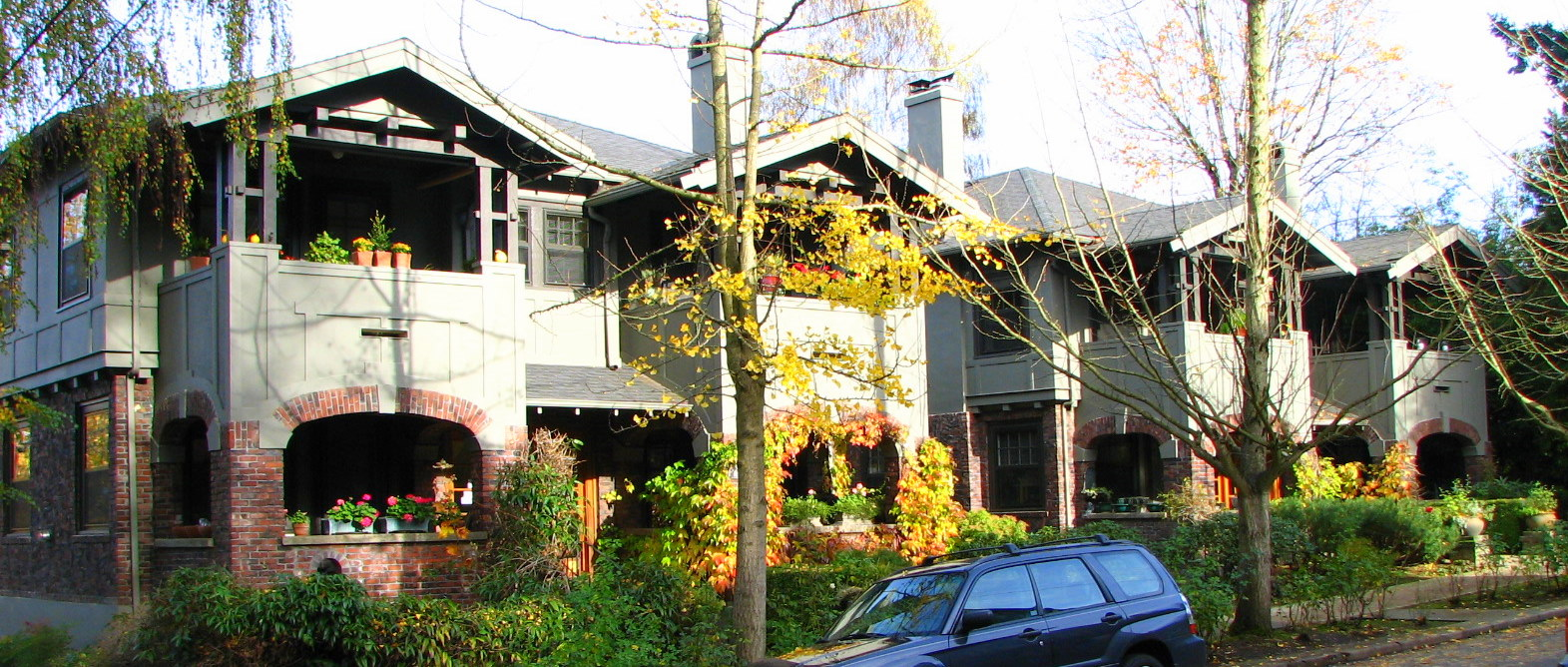
- Elm Street Apartments in 2008

- Location within Portland, Oregon Location within Oregon Location within the United States
- Location: 1825–1837 SW Elm Street; Portland, Oregon
- Coordinates: 45°30′36″N 122°41′51″W
- Area: 0.2 acres (0.081 ha)
- Built: 1916
- Architect: George R. Wright, Frederick E. Bowman
- Architectural style: Prairie School, Bungalow/Craftsman, Arts & Crafts
- NRHP reference No.: 91000056
- Added to NRHP: February 20, 1991

The Elm Street Apartments is a building complex located in southwest Portland, Oregon listed on the National Register of Historic Places.

== See also ==
- National Register of Historic Places listings in Southwest Portland, Oregon
