= Moses and Ida Kline House =

Historic building in Portland, Oregon, U.S.

- U.S. National Register of Historic Places
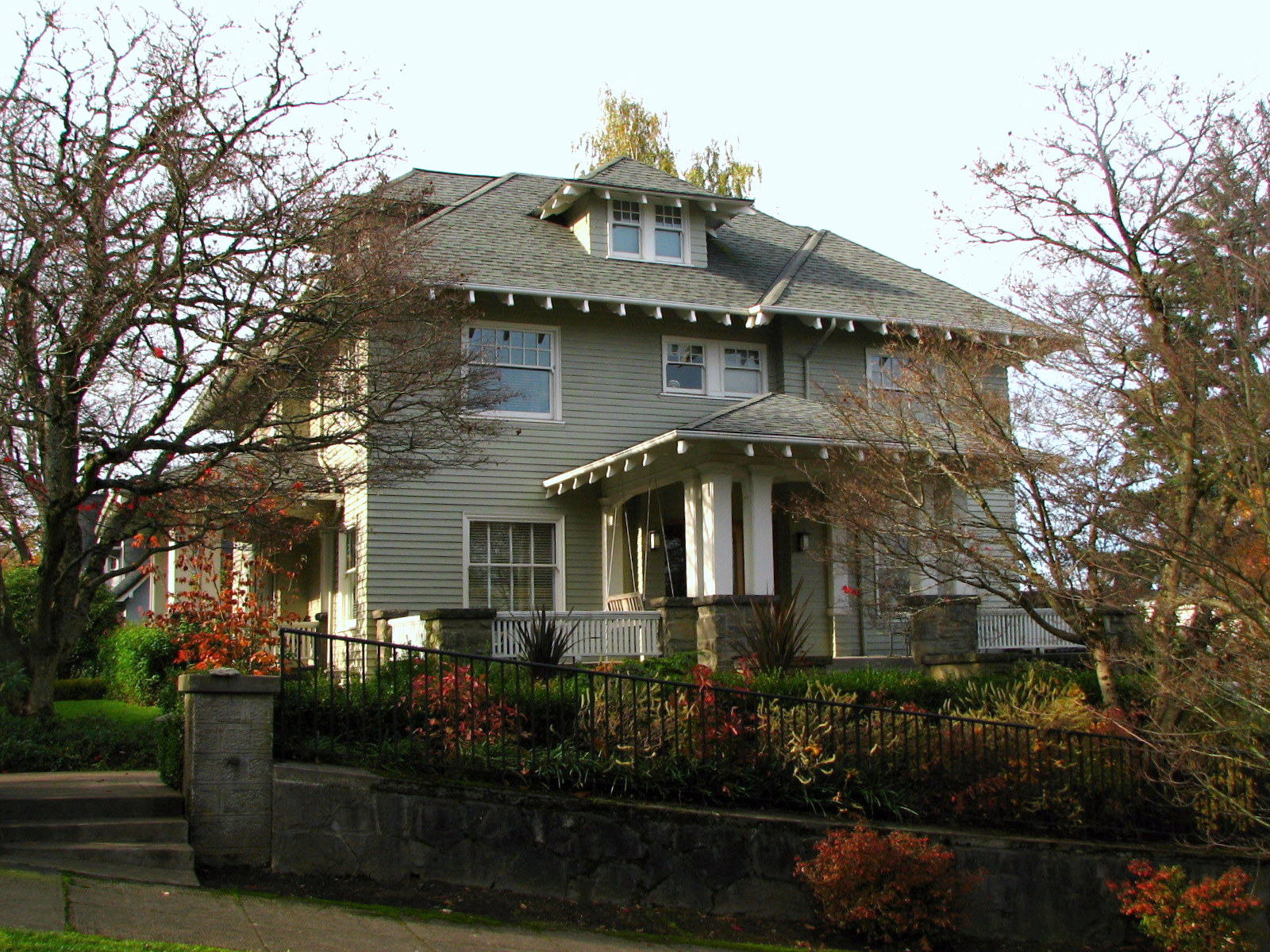
- The Kline House in 2008.

- Location within Portland, Oregon
- Location: 2233 SW 18th Avenue; Portland, Oregon
- Coordinates: 45°30′37″N 122°41′48″W
- Built: 1909
- Architect: Emil Schacht
- Architectural style: Bungalow/Craftsman
- NRHP reference No.: 04000830
- Added to NRHP: August 11, 2004

The Moses and Ida Kline House is a house located in southwest Portland, Oregon, that is listed on the National Register of Historic Places.

== See also ==
- National Register of Historic Places listings in Southwest Portland, Oregon
