= Herbert and Elizabeth Malarkey House =

Historic building in Portland, Oregon, U.S.

- U.S. National Register of Historic Places
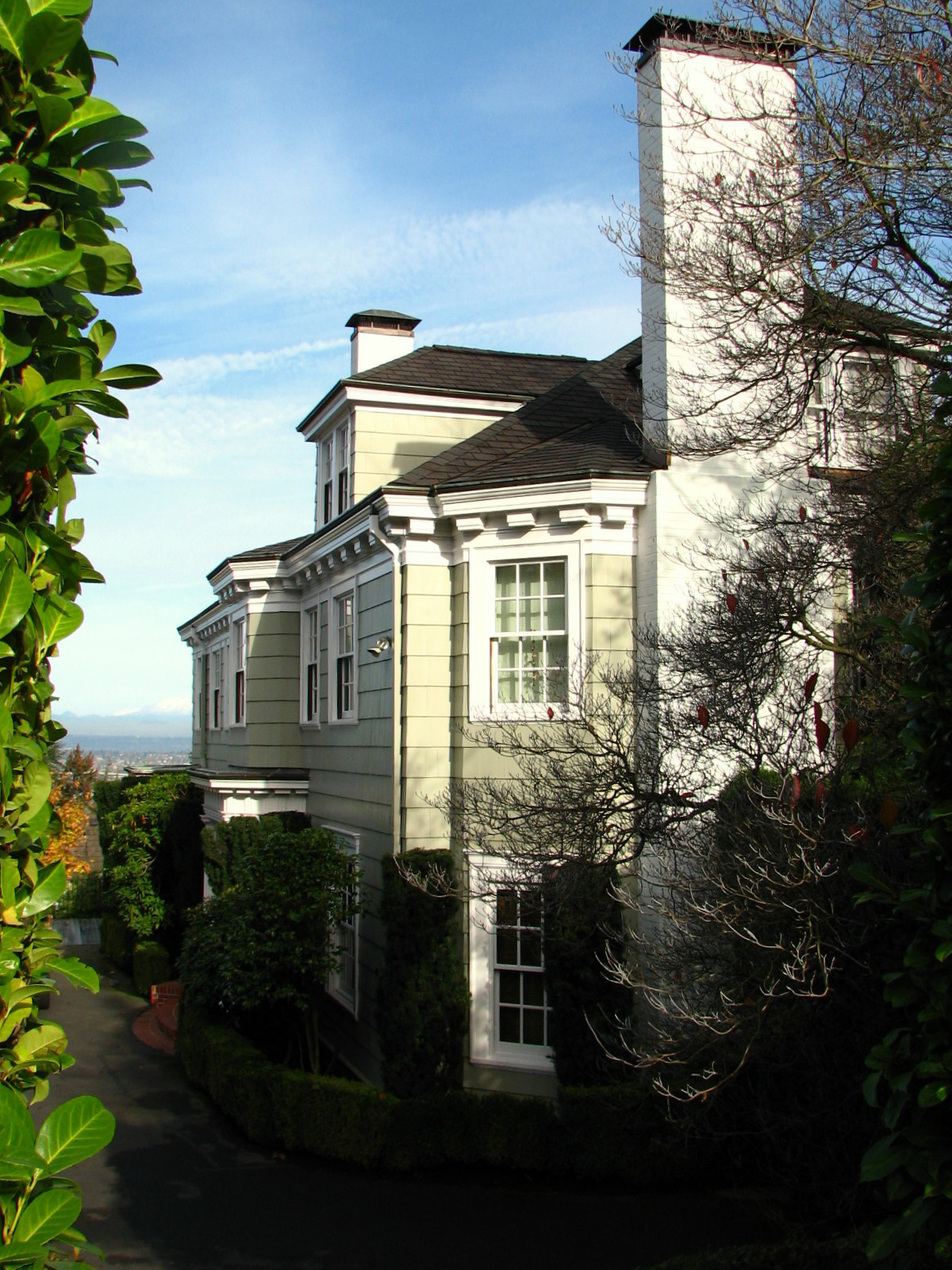
- The Malarkey House in 2008.

- Location within Portland, Oregon Location within Oregon Location within the United States
- Location: 1717 SW Elm Street; Portland, Oregon
- Coordinates: 45°30′34″N 122°41′46″W
- Built: 1934
- Architect: Edward Allen Miller, Malarkey & Kallander
- Architectural style: Colonial Revival
- NRHP reference No.: 05000827
- Added to NRHP: August 4, 2005

The Herbert and Elizabeth Malarkey House is a house located in southwest Portland, Oregon, listed on the National Register of Historic Places.

== See also ==
- National Register of Historic Places listings in Southwest Portland, Oregon
