= Nicholas–Lang House =

Historic building in Portland, Oregon, U.S.

- U.S. National Register of Historic Places
- Portland Historic Landmark
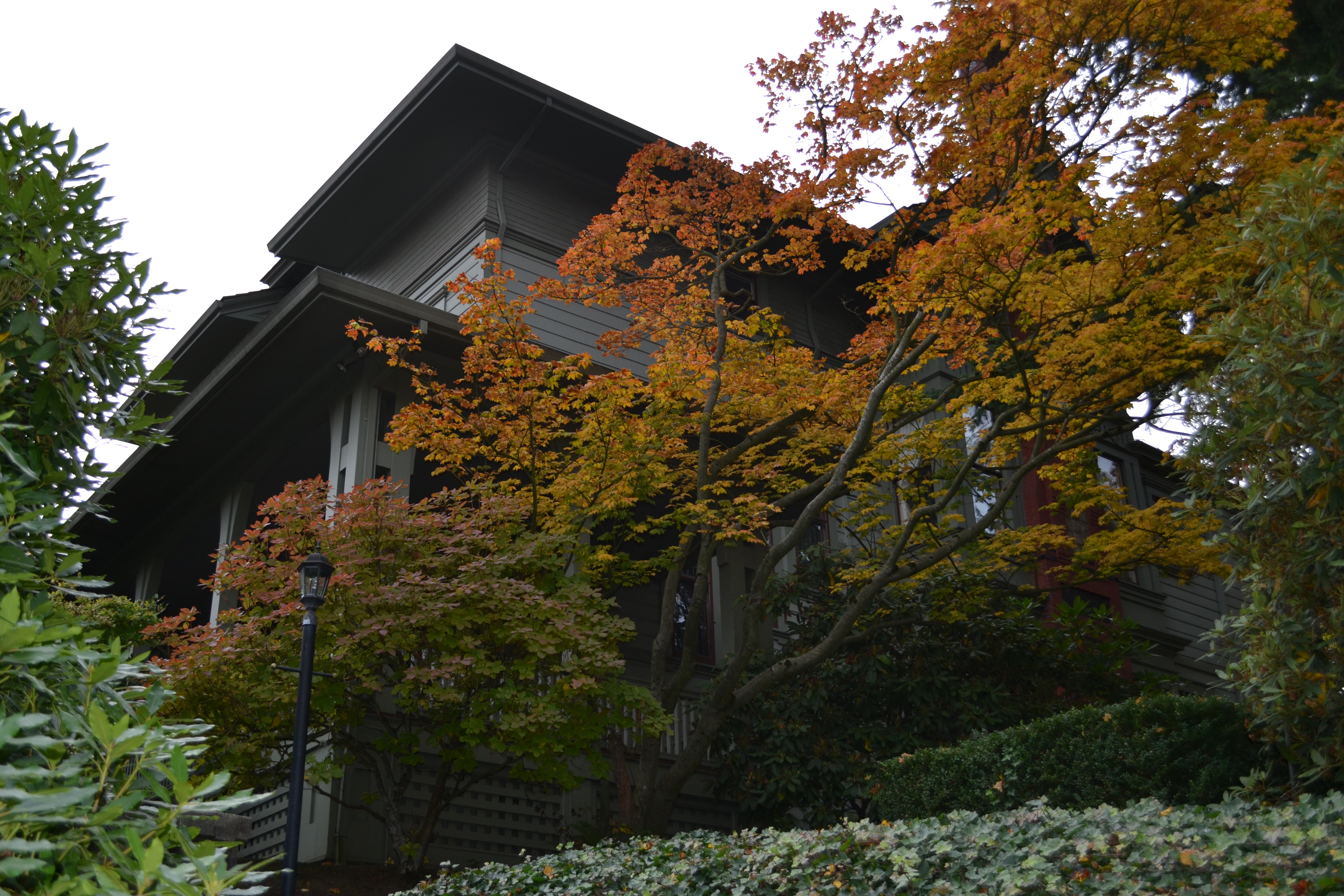
- The Nicholas–Lang House in 2011.

- Location within Portland, Oregon Location within Oregon Location within the United States
- Location: 2030 SW Vista Avenue; Portland, Oregon
- Coordinates: 45°30′44″N 122°41′50″W
- Area: less than one acre
- Built: 1884
- Architectural style: Queen Anne, Tudor Gothic
- NRHP reference No.: 79002137
- Added to NRHP: March 13, 1979

The Nicholas–Lang House is a house located in southwest Portland, Oregon listed on the National Register of Historic Places.

== See also ==
- National Register of Historic Places listings in Southwest Portland, Oregon
