= Alderway Building =

Historic building in Portland, Oregon, U.S.

Coordinates: 45.5203°N 122.6795°W

The building's exterior in 2024

The Alderway Building is a historic building in Portland, Oregon, United States. Located in downtown Portland, it is listed on the National Register of Historic Places. It was recognized in 2024.

== See also ==
- National Register of Historic Places listings in South and Southwest Portland, Oregon
