= Peck Bros. and Bartle Tire Service Company Building =

Historic building in Portland, Oregon, U.S.

- U.S. National Register of Historic Places
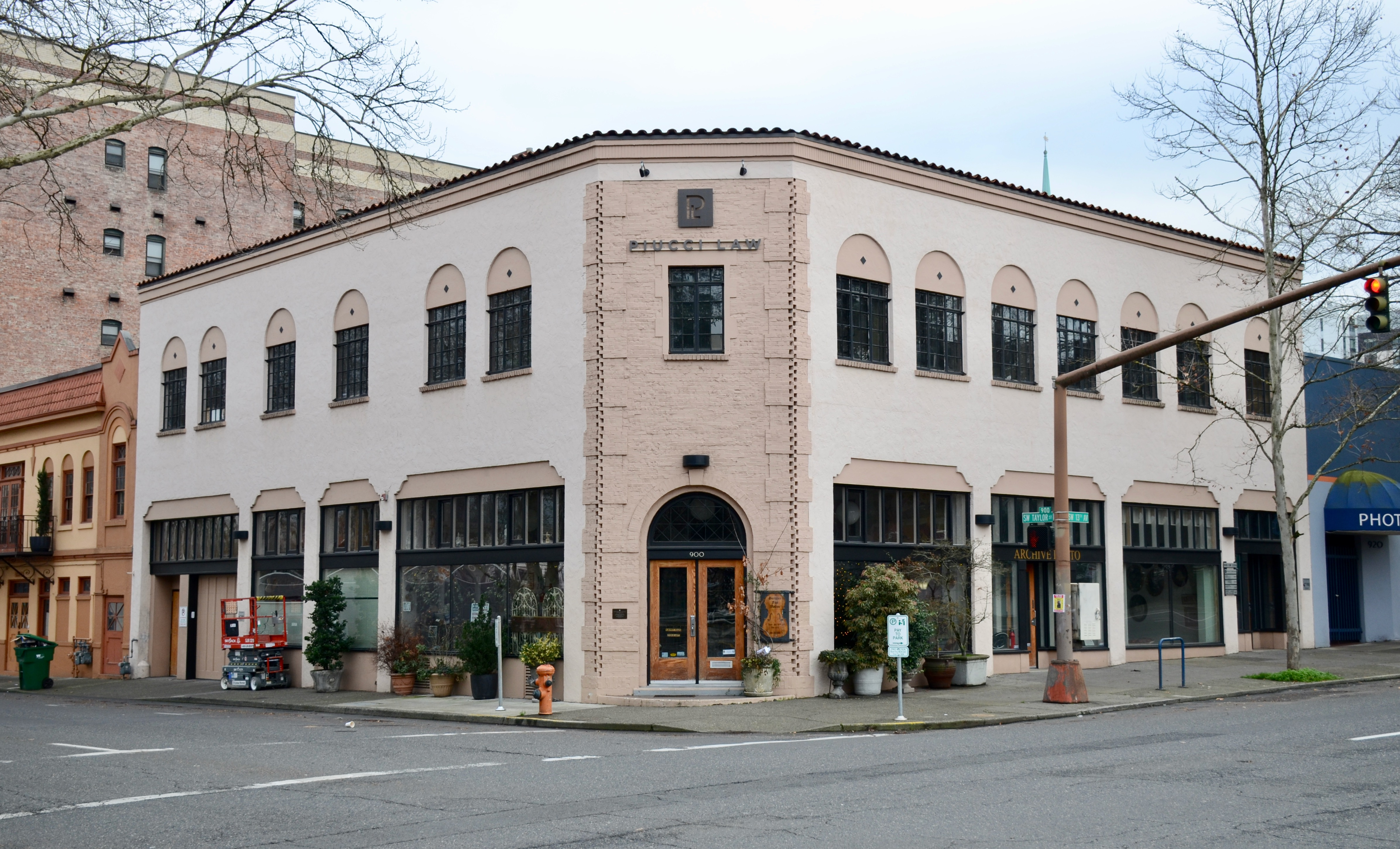
- Viewed from the northwest in 2018

- Location within Portland, Oregon Location within Oregon Location within the United States
- Location: 900 SW 13th Avenue; Portland, Oregon
- Coordinates: 45°31′09″N 122°41′09″W
- Area: Less than one acre
- Built: 1927
- Architect: Charles W. Ertz
- Architectural style: Mission/Spanish Revival
- NRHP reference No.: 03000072
- Added to NRHP: February 27, 2003

The Peck Bros. and Bartle Tire Service Company Building, also known as the Photo Art Building, is a building located in downtown Portland, Oregon, United States, listed on the National Register of Historic Places.

It was designed by architect Charles W. Ertz to serve the Peck Bros. and Bartle company, a tire sales and service firm. It was renovated in 1973 to serve the Photo Art Commercial Photographers.

It is a two-story flat-roofed building with a basement, and is about 65 by 69 feet (20 m × 21 m) in plan, with its main entry at the corner cut at an angle. It had a tire sales area and a large garage area for tire and auto service on the first floor.

== See also ==
- National Register of Historic Places listings in Southwest Portland, Oregon
