= Annand–Loomis House =

Historic building in Portland, Oregon, U.S.

- U.S. National Register of Historic Places
- Portland Historic Landmark
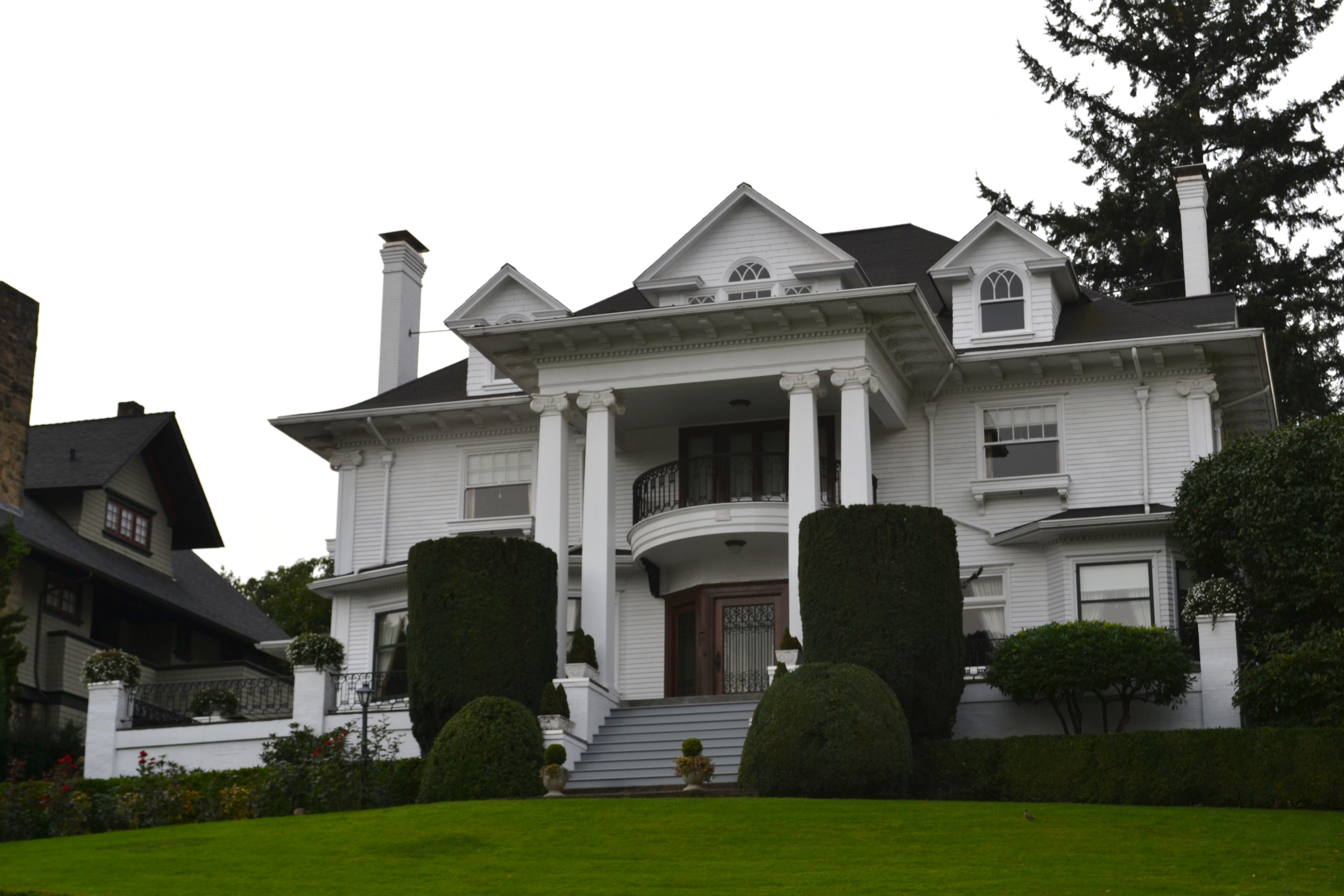

- Location within Portland, Oregon
- Location: 1825 SW Vista Avenue; Portland, Oregon
- Coordinates: 45°30′52″N 122°41′49″W
- Area: 0.3 acres (0.12 ha)
- Built: 1908
- Architect: Clifton R. Lewthwaite
- Architectural style: Colonial Revival, Late 19th And 20th Century Revivals
- NRHP reference No.: 97000586
- Added to NRHP: June 27, 1997

The Annand–Loomis House is a house located in southwest Portland, Oregon, listed on the National Register of Historic Places. It has also been known as the John Annand House and as the Lee B. Loomis House.

It is a 2 1/2-story Georgian Colonial house finished in 1908 for Portland businessman and City Commissioner John Annand and his family. The house has views of Cascade Range peaks and of the city on plains to the north and east. The property was nominated in part on the basis of association with Lee B. Loomis, but that historical claim was not upheld.

== See also ==
- National Register of Historic Places listings in Southwest Portland, Oregon
