= Marquam Manor =

Historic building in Portland, Oregon, U.S.

- U.S. National Register of Historic Places
- Portland Historic Landmark
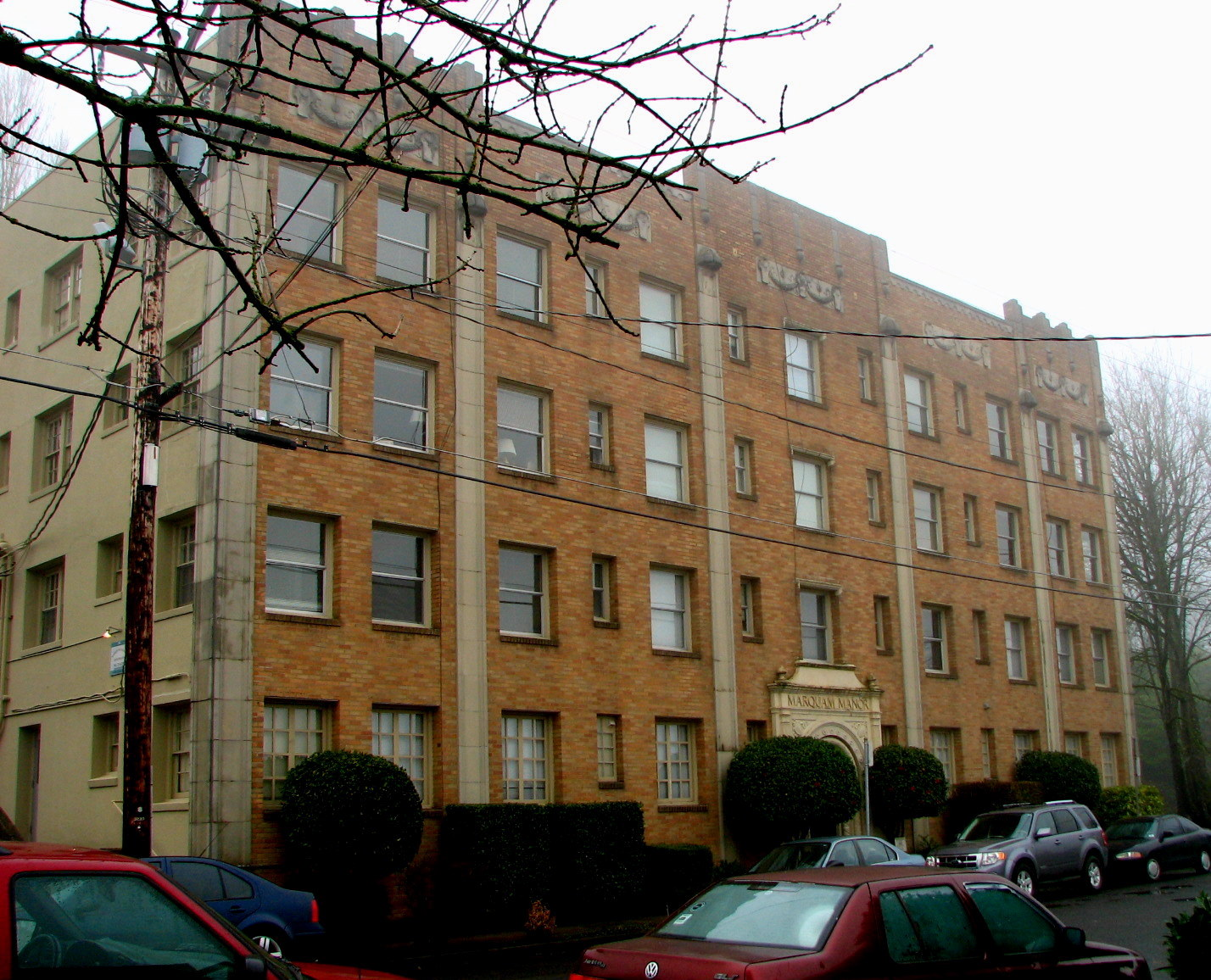

- Location within Portland, Oregon
- Location: 3211 SW 10th Avenue; Portland, Oregon
- Coordinates: 45°29′58″N 122°41′26″W
- Built: 1930
- Architect: Elmer E. Feig
- Architectural style: Modern Movement
- NRHP reference No.: 93000449
- Added to NRHP: May 27, 1993

The Marquam Manor is a historic residential building located at 3211 SW 10th Avenue in Southwest Portland, Oregon. It was constructed in 1930 by Elmer E. Feig and was listed on the National Register of Historic Places on May 27, 1993.

== See also ==
- National Register of Historic Places listings in Southwest Portland, Oregon
