= Jewish Shelter Home =

Historic building in Portland, Oregon, U.S.

- U.S. National Register of Historic Places
- Portland Historic Landmark
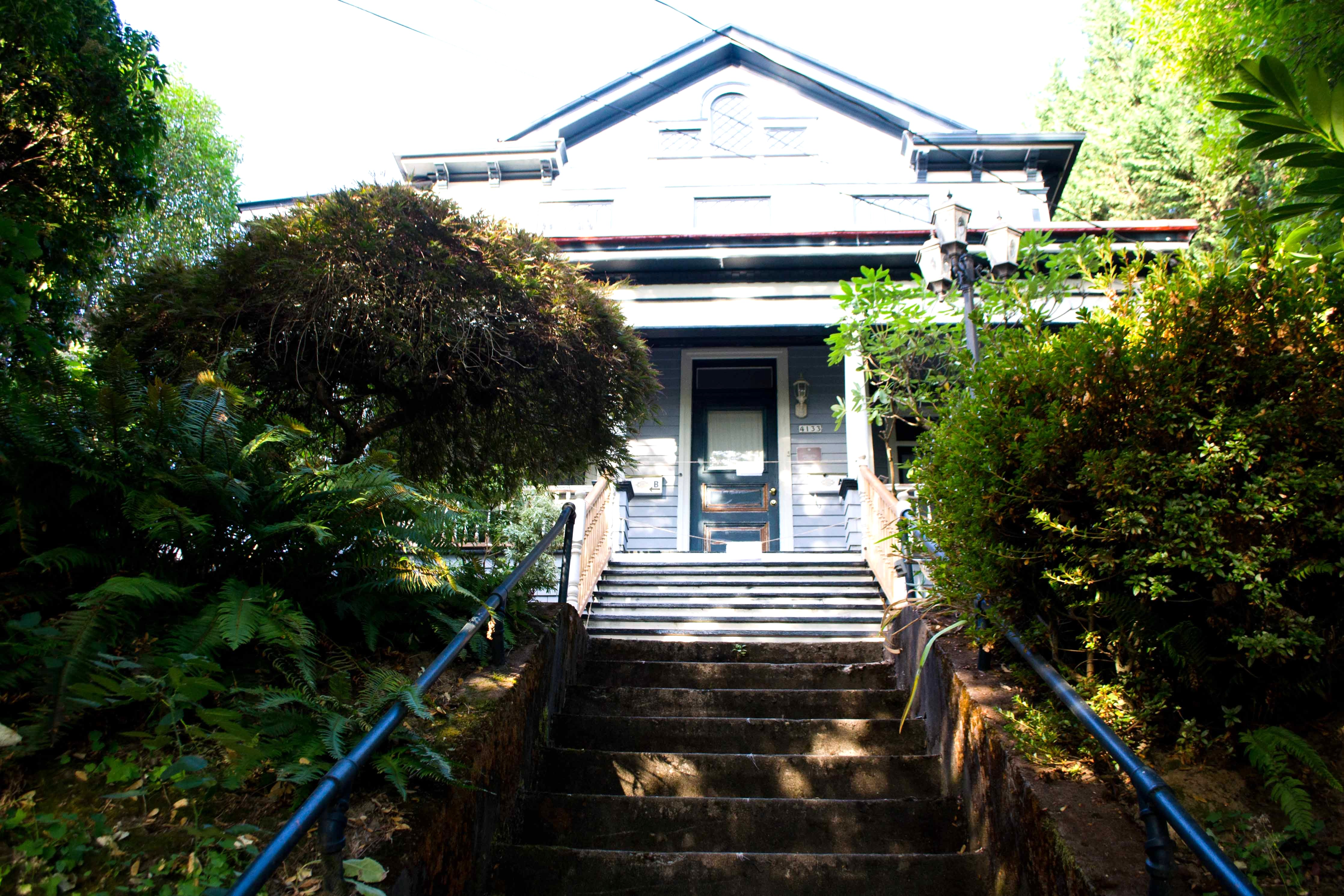

- Location within Portland, Oregon Location within Oregon Location within the United States
- Location: 4133 SW Corbett Avenue; Portland, Oregon
- Coordinates: 45°29′36″N 122°40′35″W
- Area: less than one acre
- Built: 1919
- Architectural style: Colonial Revival, Queen Anne
- NRHP reference No.: 84003083
- Added to NRHP: June 14, 1984

The Jewish Shelter Home, also known as Elmer Colwell House, located in southwest Portland, Oregon, is listed on the National Register of Historic Places.

== See also ==
- National Register of Historic Places listings in Southwest Portland, Oregon
