= Lumbermen's Building =

Historic building in Portland, Oregon, U.S.

- U.S. National Register of Historic Places
- Portland Historic Landmark
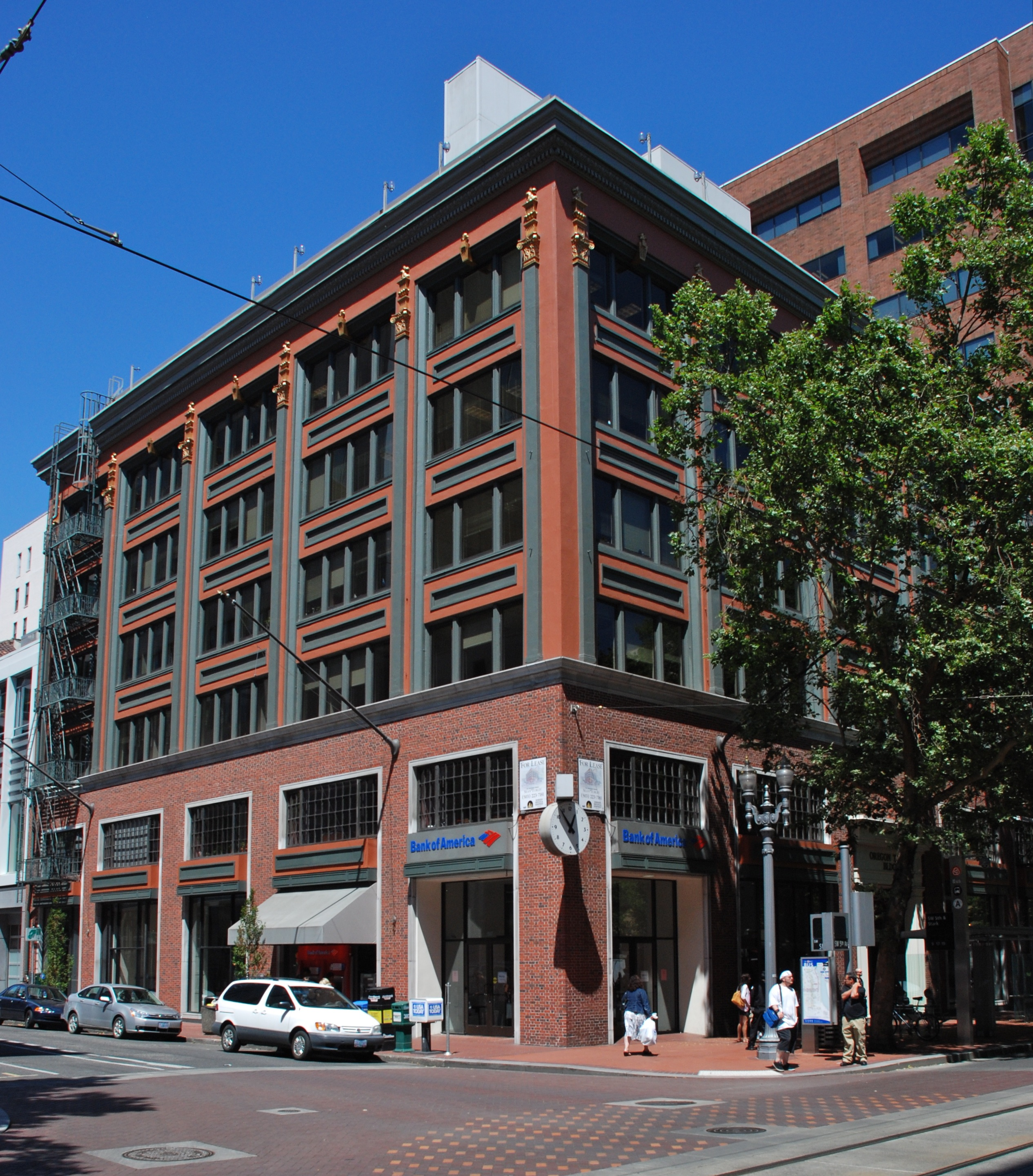
- Oregon Trail Building (ex-Lumbermen's Building) in 2011

- Location within Portland, Oregon Location within Oregon
- Location: 333 SW 5th Avenue; Portland, Oregon
- Coordinates: 45°31′16″N 122°40′36″W
- Area: less than one acre
- Built: 1909
- Architect: David C. Lewis
- Architectural style: Chicago, Early Commercial
- NRHP reference No.: 96000992
- Added to NRHP: September 12, 1996

The Lumbermen's Building (also known as the Oregon Trail Building) is an office building located at 333 SW Fifth Avenue in Downtown Portland, Oregon. It was listed on the National Register of Historic Places on September 12, 1996.

== See also ==
- National Register of Historic Places listings in Southwest Portland, Oregon
