= Mark Dosch =

American politician (born 1960)

Member of the North Dakota House of Representatives from the 32nd district
- Incumbent
- Assumed office 2000

Personal details
- Born: 1960 (age 65–66)
- Party: Republican

Mark Dosch (born 1960) is an American politician. He is a member of the North Dakota House of Representatives from the 32nd District, serving since 2000. He is a member of the Republican party.
