= Henry E. Dosch House =

Historic building in Portland, Oregon, U.S.

- U.S. National Register of Historic Places
- Portland Historic Landmark
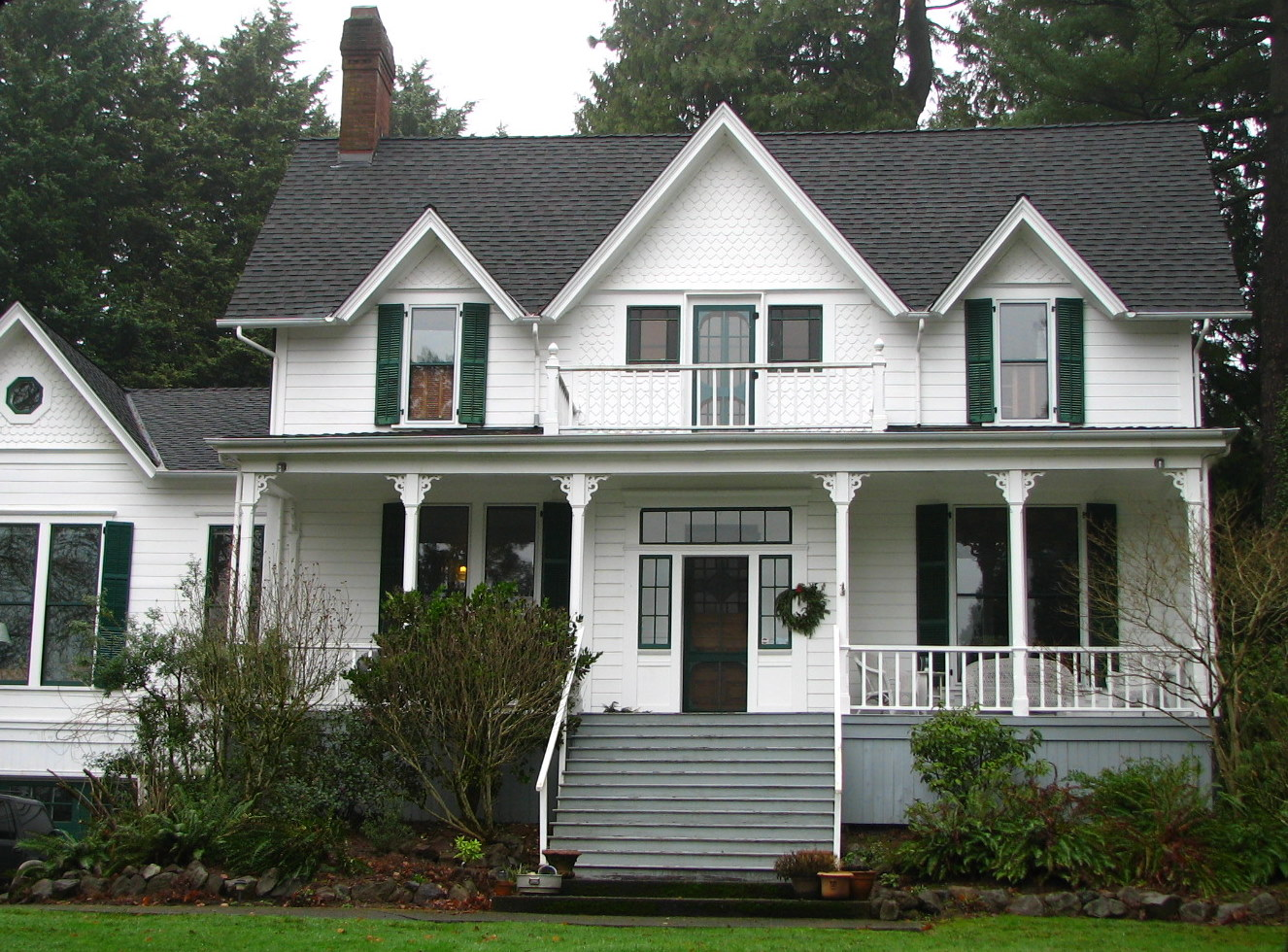
- Henry E. Dosch House in 2009

- Location within Portland, Oregon
- Location: 4825 SW Dosch Park Lane; Portland, Oregon
- Coordinates: 45°29′15″N 122°42′25″W
- Area: 0.7 acres (0.28 ha)
- Built: 1890; 136 years ago
- NRHP reference No.: 78002312
- Added to NRHP: October 2, 1978

The Henry E. Dosch House is a house located in southwest Portland, Oregon listed on the National Register of Historic Places.

== See also ==
- Henry E. Dosch
- National Register of Historic Places listings in Southwest Portland, Oregon
