= John S. Honeyman House =

Historic building in Portland, Oregon, U.S.

- U.S. National Register of Historic Places
- Portland Historic Landmark
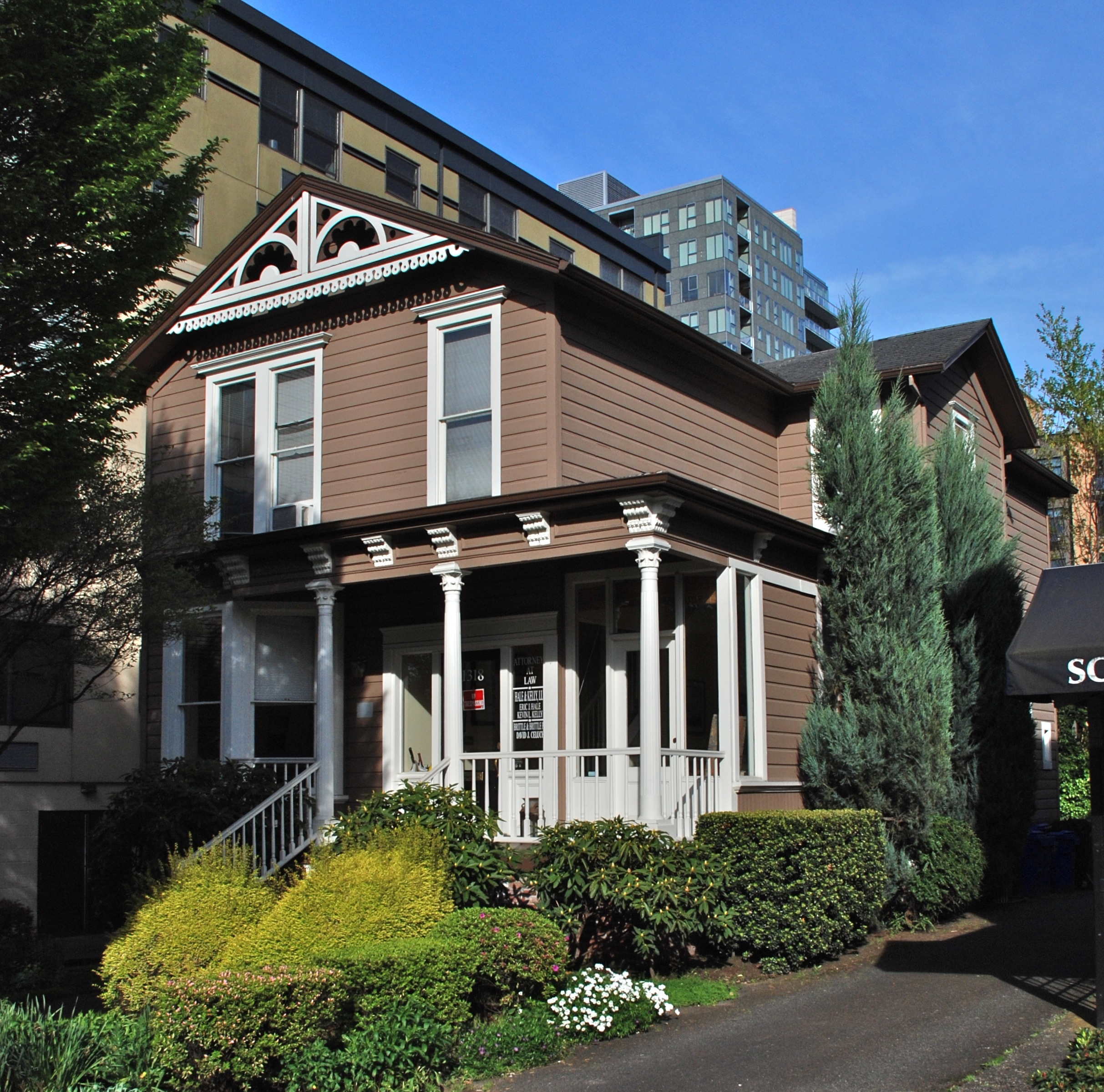
- John S. Honeyman House in 2012

- Location within Portland, Oregon
- Location: 1318 SW 12th Avenue; Portland, Oregon
- Coordinates: 45°30′58″N 122°41′10″W
- Area: 0.1 acres (0.040 ha)
- Built: 1879
- Architectural style: Italianate
- NRHP reference No.: 85003436
- Added to NRHP: October 31, 1985

The John S. Honeyman House is a house built in 1879 in the Italian Villa style. Located in the West End area of downtown Portland, Oregon, it was listed on the National Register of Historic Places in 1985.

== See also ==
- National Register of Historic Places listings in Southwest Portland, Oregon
