= List of Marylhurst University buildings =

List of buildings on the Marylhurst University campus in Oregon, U.S.

Buildings and structures on the defunct Marylhurst University campus include:

- Aquinas Hall
- B.P. John Administrative Building
- Baxter Hall
- Clark Commons
- Davignon Hall
- Flavia Hall
- Marian Hall
- Mayer Art Building
- O'Hara Hall
- Shoen Library
- St. Anne's Chapel
- St. Catherine Hall
- Thompson Hall
- Villa Maria Hall

== See also ==
- List of Portland State University buildings
- List of Reed College buildings
- List of University of Oregon buildings
- List of University of Portland buildings
- List of Willamette University buildings
