= Jacobberger House =

Jacobberger House may refer to either of two houses in Portland, Oregon, designed and occupied by architect Joseph Jacobberger:

- Josef Jacobberger House, SW Upper Hall Street
- Joseph Jacobberger Country House, SW Sweetbriar Street
