= Marylhurst =

Marylhurst may refer to:

- Marylhurst, Oregon, U.S.
- Marylhurst University, in Marylhurst, Oregon, U.S.
- Marylhurst Art Gym, at Marylhurst University
