= Calumet Hotel =

Calumet Hotel may refer to:

- Calumet Hotel (Pipestone, Minnesota), listed on the NRHP in Minnesota
- Calumet Hotel (Portland, Oregon), listed on the NRHP in Oregon
- Calumet Hotel (Wasta, South Dakota), listed on the NRHP in South Dakota
