= Art Gym =

Art gallery in Oregon, United States

Coordinates: 45.398509°N 122.647794°W

The Art Gym
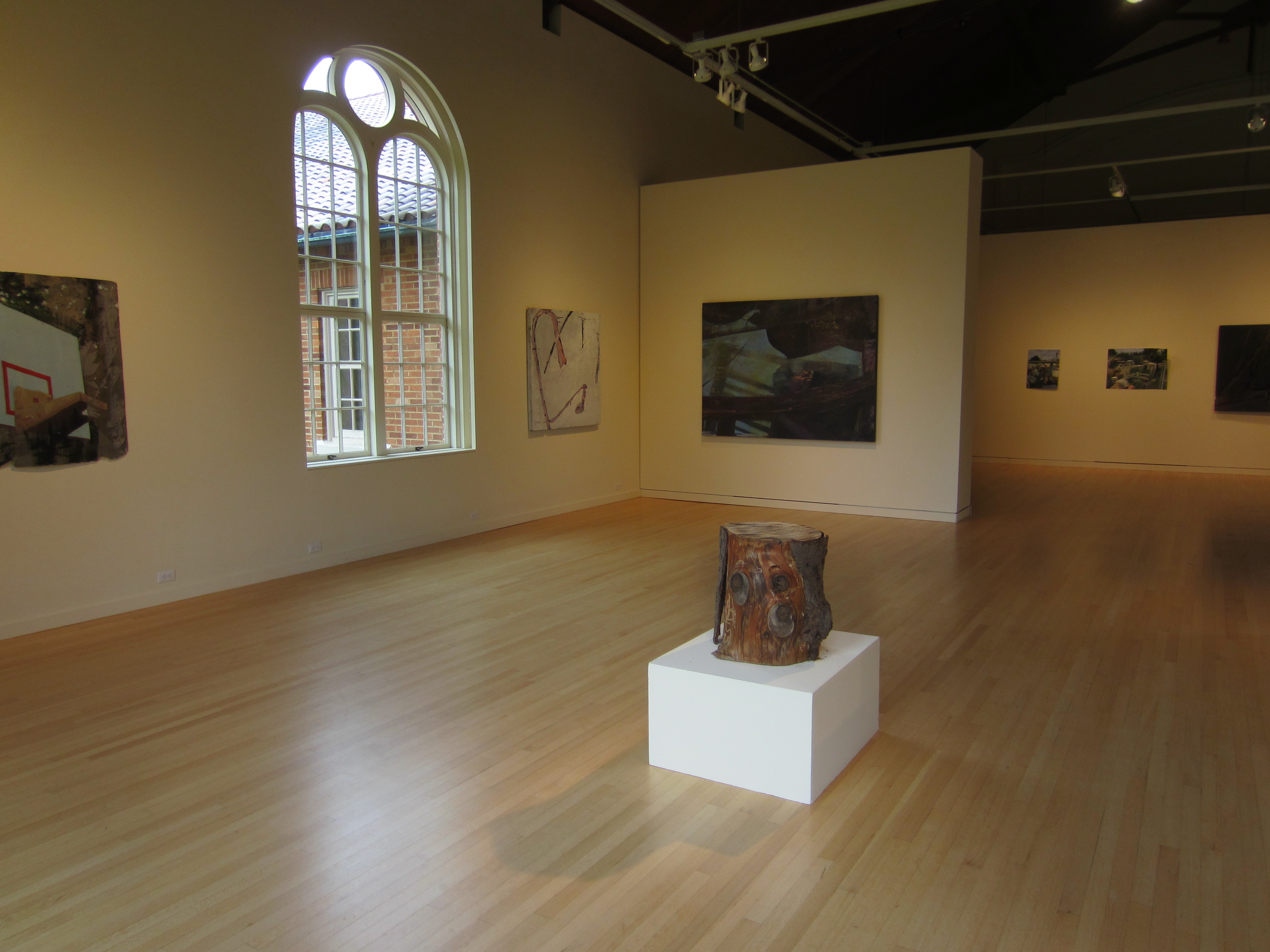
- Established: 1980
- Dissolved: 2018
- Location: Marylhurst, Oregon, United States
- Type: University: art
- Founder: Kay Slusarenko, Paul Sutinen, and Terri Hopkins
- Website: artgym.marylhurst.edu

The Art Gym was a nonprofit, noncollecting contemporary arts gallery at Marylhurst University in Marylhurst, Oregon, United States. The gallery had been permanently moved to the Portland Art Museum in 2018, as Marylhurst University closed at the end of 2018.

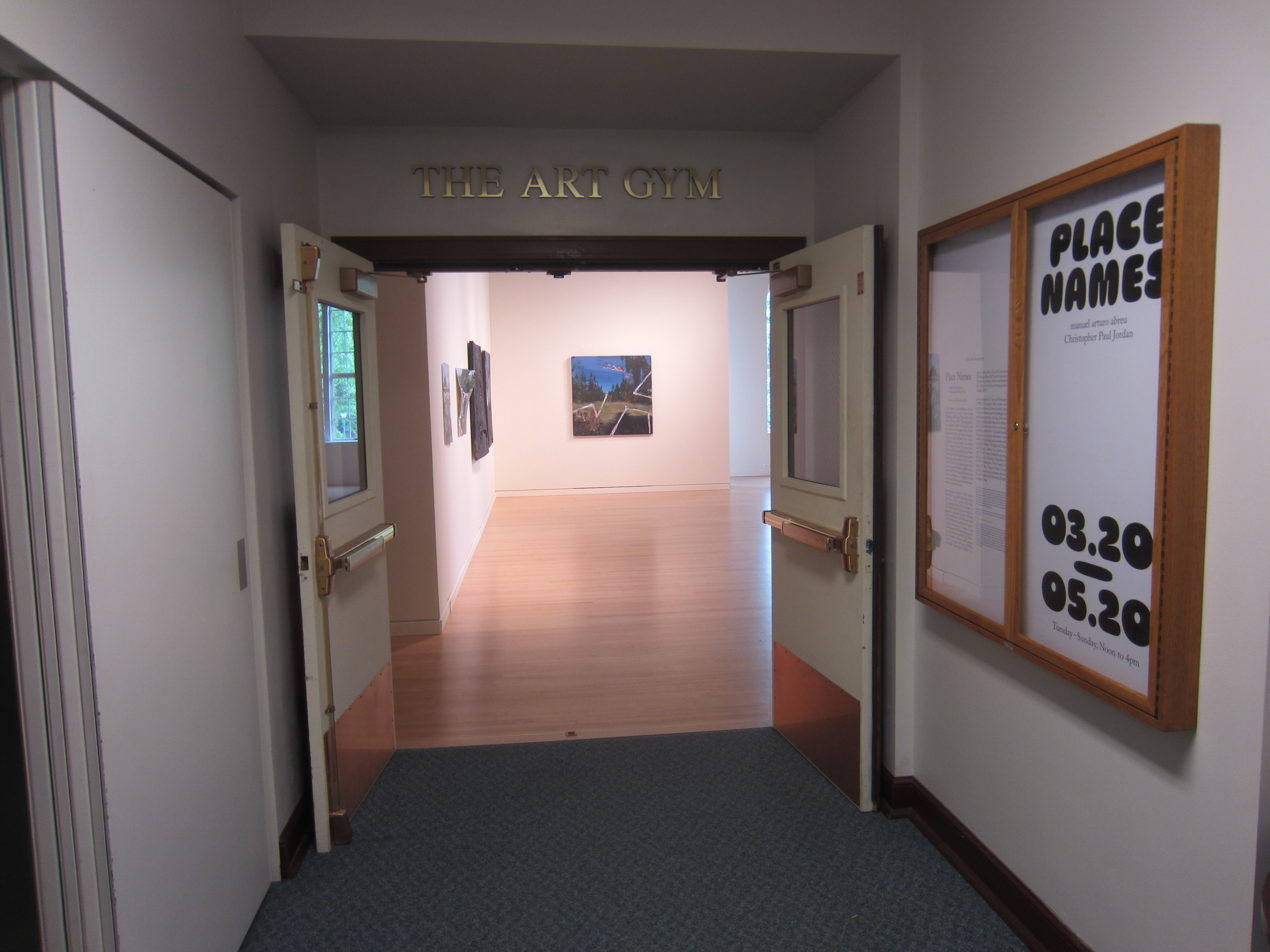
Entrance from inside the B.P. John Administrative Building, 2018

The Art Gym was devoted to the artwork of the Pacific Northwest supporting retrospectives, mid-career surveys, experimental, and large-scale exhibitions. Since 1980, The Art Gym had shown the work of more than 300 artists, produced more than 80 exhibition catalogs, and sponsored numerous artist roundtables and public forums.

== History ==
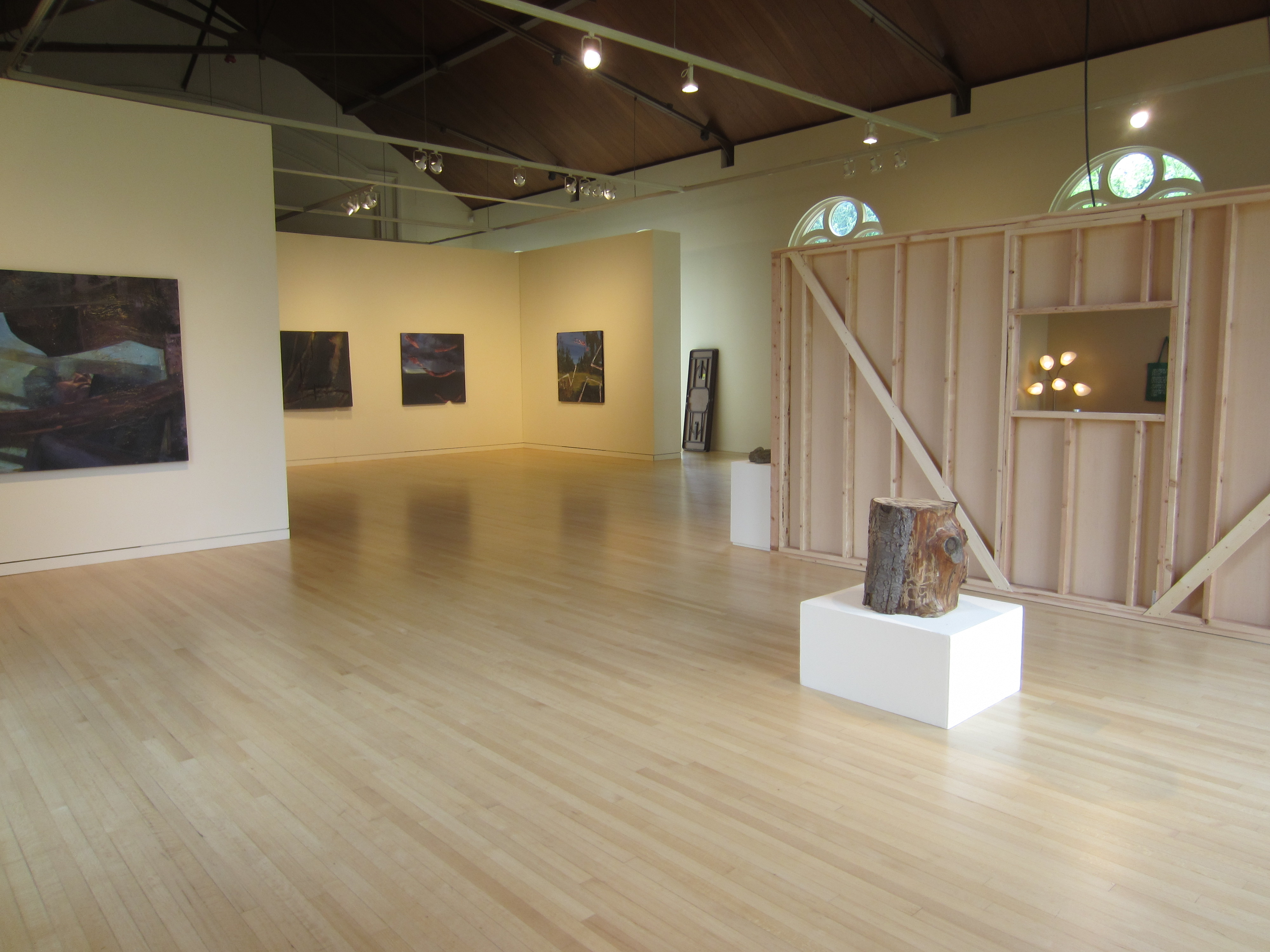
Interior, 2018

The Art Gym was founded in 1980 by Marylhurst University art faculty members Kay Slusarenko, Paul Sutinen, and Terri Hopkins, who together raised $1500 from a banquet and cookie sale, to open the 2,700 square foot gallery. Hopkins, in particular, lead the charge to curate the exhibits, and to raise the necessary funds for them. The university funds the space and basic infrastructure. Since then, the gallery has occupied what was previously the campus gymnasium and theater on the third floor of the university's B.P. John Administrative Building. The Art Gym is dedicated to producing exhibitions and publications featuring artists of the Pacific Northwest.

In 1990, Oregonian reporter Randy Gragg asserted it had "become one of the Northwest's most important showcases of regional art," and noted that it had already shown the work of more than 250 Northwest artists, most from the Portland metropolitan area. He noted three "key opportunities" offered by the Art Gym: "young emerging artists new on the scene, mid-career artists wanting to break new ground and senior artists who deserve recognition."

The Art Gym held a fundraiser exhibit for its 20th anniversary, in 2000, to raise money to refinish the floors and rebuild the movable walls. The exhibit, titled "Wonder Women to the Rescue," featured 34 local artists, each of whom contributed 50% of proceeds to the cause.

Marylhurst University announced it would cease operations in 2018, prompting concern about the Art Gym's future. In July 2018, the Art Gym announced that it would be moving to the Oregon College of Art and Craft effective August 1, 2018. Ultimately, this plan fell through, and Oregon College of Art and Craft closed in 2019 due to financial woes. On December 28, 2018, The Art Gym and Portland Art Museum announced that The Art Gym archives, including exhibition catalogs, historical documents, trademarks, proprietary rights and website, would transfer to the Crumpacker Library at the Portland Art Museum.

== Recognition ==
In 2005, The Art Gym received a Governor's Arts Award.

In 2013, Robert and Mercedes Eichholz Foundation awarded a million dollar match endowment to support the Art Gym's curator position.

== Directors and curators ==
Ashley Stull Meyers was appointed the Art Gym's third director and curator in 2017.

Previous directors include Terri Hopkins (from 1980 to 2013) and Blake Shell (from 2013 to 2017).
