= Aquinas Hall =

Building at Marylhurst University, Oregon, U.S.

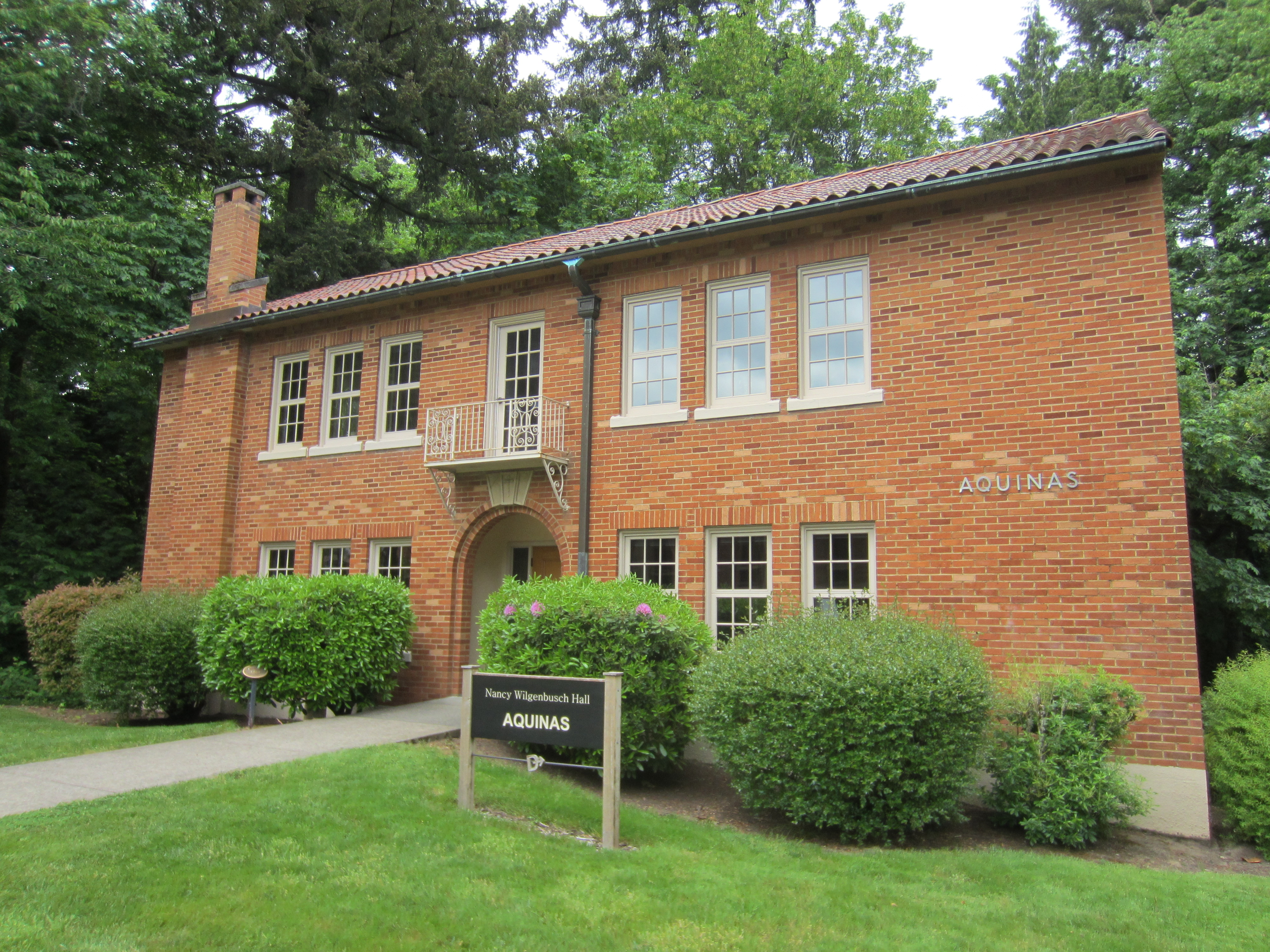
- The building's exterior in 2018

- Location within Oregon
- Alternative names: Nancy Wilgenbusch Hall

General information
- Location: Portland, Oregon, United States
- Coordinates: 45.40172°N 122.65224°W
- Completed: c. 1930

Design and construction
- Architects: Joseph Jacobberger; Alfred Smith

Aquinas Hall (also known as Nancy Wilgenbusch Hall) is a building on the now defunct Marylhurst University campus in Marylhurst, Oregon, United States. The building was designed by Joseph Jacobberger and Alfred Smith, and completed c. 1930. Aquinas Hall exhibits the Mediterranean architectural style, and was used as student housing, and later administrative offices until the university closed in late 2018.
