= Dr. James Rosenfeld House =

Historic building in Portland, Oregon, U.S.

- U.S. National Register of Historic Places
- Portland Historic Landmark
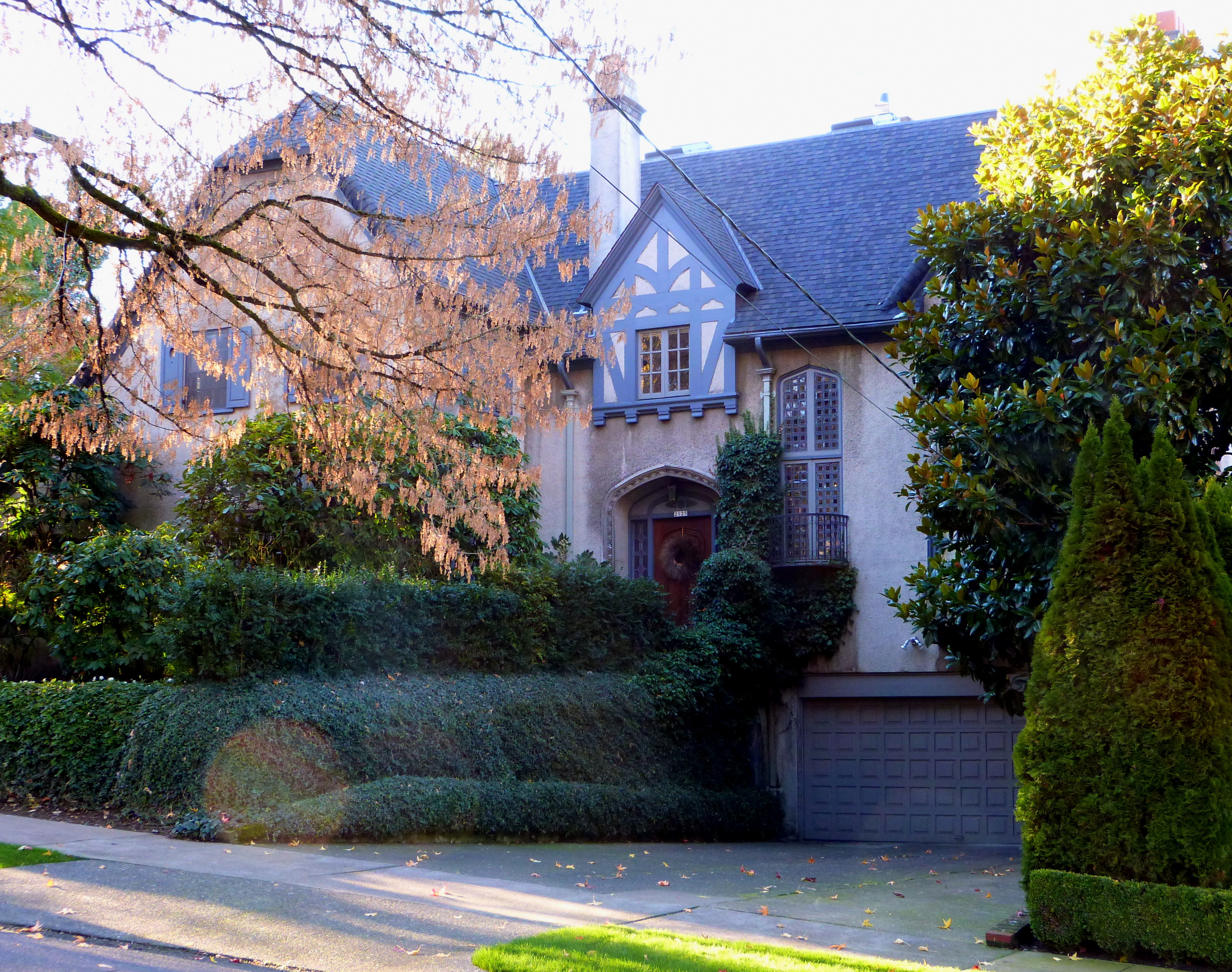
- The Rosenfeld House in 2013

- Location within Portland, Oregon
- Location: 2125 SW 21st Avenue; Portland, Oregon
- Coordinates: 45°30′43″N 122°41′57″W
- Area: 0.2 acres (0.081 ha)
- Built: 1929
- Architect: Joseph Jacobberger, A.T. Horn
- Architectural style: Late 19th And 20th Century Revivals, English Cottage
- NRHP reference No.: 89000060
- Added to NRHP: February 23, 1989

The Dr. James Rosenfeld House is a house located in southwest Portland, Oregon listed on the National Register of Historic Places.

== See also ==
- National Register of Historic Places listings in Southwest Portland, Oregon
