= Columbia Coliseum =

Former gymnasium in Portland, Oregon, U.S.

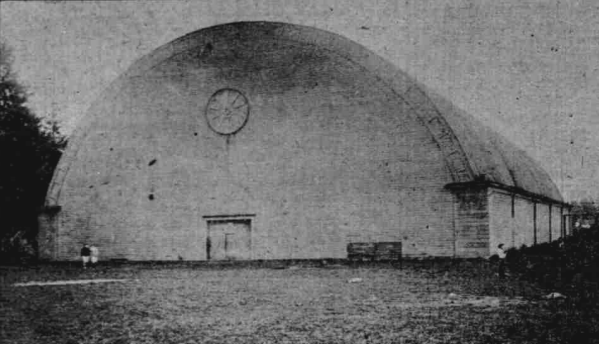
- Former names: Columbia Gymnasium
- Location: Portland, Oregon
- Owner: Columbia University
- Capacity: 1,600–2,000
- Surface: dirt

Construction
- Groundbreaking: 1902
- Built: 1903
- Renovated: 1910, 1916
- Closed: 1927
- Demolished: unknown
- Architect: Joseph Jacobberger

Columbia Coliseum, also known as Columbia Gymnasium, was a gymnasium on the campus of Columbia University (now the University of Portland) in Portland, Oregon. It was designed in 1902 by Joseph Jacobberger to house sports that were traditionally played outdoors, like baseball and football. Constructed the following year it was the largest gymnasium in Oregon, and possibly the Pacific Northwest. Starting in 1905, Columbia Coliseum became the site of an annual statewide track and field event hosted by the university. It was last used in 1927 and has since been demolished.

== History ==
At 24,500 square feet (2,280 m^{2}), Columbia Coliseum was the largest sports venue in Oregon (and possibly the Pacific Northwest) when it opened in 1903. At the highest point, the ceilings were 70 feet (21 m). The gymnasium was constructed with trusses so no support beams would obstruct the playing area. The building featured natural light from glass skylights in the ceiling. Tracks were on the outside of a dirt playing surface, which was big enough for sports traditionally played outdoors like baseball or football. Although indoor baseball (now known as softball) was becoming popularized at the turn of the 20th century, Columbia University organized a traditional baseball team to play indoors, a rarity at the time.

Joseph Jacobberger was the building's architect. In 1927, Columbia University again commissioned Joseph Jacobberger (now partnered with Alfred Smith) to design a new gymnasium for the school which became Howard Hall.

In an Oregon Daily Journal article on August 22, 1909 entitled "Columbia University on the Willamette beautiful for situation", the following was written about the coliseum:

"Columbia University's Coliseum deserves a paragraph by itself. There is not another like it this side of the Rocky Mountains and few like it anywhere. It can be seen for miles and is big enough to contain a national political convention. Its size may be imagined when 2,000 persons can be comfortably seated around the sides and still leave rooms for hundreds of contestants to disport themselves. Ten times around this monster gymnasium makes a mile and a baseball match can be comfortably played inside with plenty of room for the fielders to get all the ball chasing they want. Containing a high arched roof that does away with supportive pillars, the interior is clear of obstacles and affords a free, unobstructed ground room convertible into an immense playground during the rainy season.

[...]

"An interesting feature about the building is its remarkable acoustic qualities. A conversation at one end of the hall is heard distinctly at the other. The building might be crowded and a speaker could address all in an ordinary conversational tone of voice in perfect clearness."

=== Events ===
In 1903 the student body raised money to start a track and field and football team to play in the gymnasium. An annual statewide track and field event was hosted at Columbia Coliseum from 1905–1915 and 1917–1922.

In 1907 the Columbia University basketball team joined the Portland Interscholastic League. The first few seasons all the league's teams had to play in the Columbia Coliseum since most venues could not accommodate the relatively new sport of basketball. No wood floor was installed for basketball games, meaning the teams would have to play on dirt.

The Commercial Club, a group of Portland businessmen, donated $10,000 towards upgrading Columbia Coliseum in 1910. That year, the Portland Colts of the Class-B Northwestern League held their spring training camp at the gymnasium. The coliseum was closed temporarily in 1916 due to significant damage to the structure after snow had built-up on the ceiling, causing part of it to cave in. The roof was repaired and the gymnasium re-opened the following year. The last sport to play in the gymnasium was basketball in 1927. It has since been demolished.
