= Alfred H. and Mary E. Smith House =

Historic building in Portland, Oregon, U.S.

- U.S. National Register of Historic Places
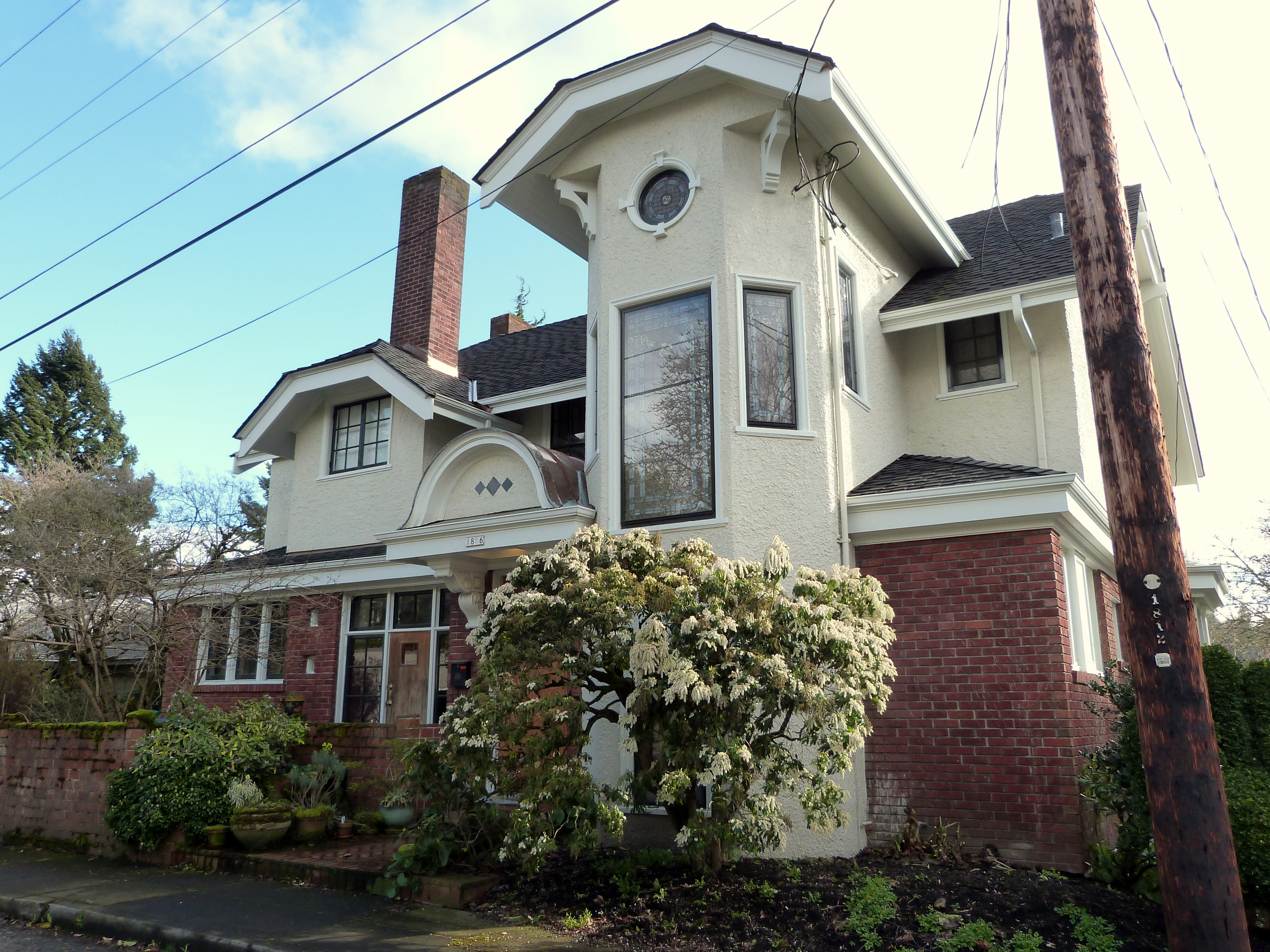
- The Alfred and Mary Smith House in 2013

- Location within Portland, Oregon
- Location: 1806 SW High Street; Portland, Oregon
- Coordinates: 45.506828°N 122.698803°W
- Area: less than one acre
- Built: 1912
- Architect: Joseph Jacobberger, Alfred H. Smith
- Architectural style: Bungalow/Craftsman
- NRHP reference No.: 07000926
- Added to NRHP: September 6, 2007

The Alfred H. and Mary E. Smith House is a house located in southwest Portland, Oregon listed on the National Register of Historic Places.

== See also ==
- National Register of Historic Places listings in Southwest Portland, Oregon
