= Auto Rest Garage =

Historic building in Portland, Oregon, U.S.

- U.S. National Register of Historic Places
- Portland Historic Landmark
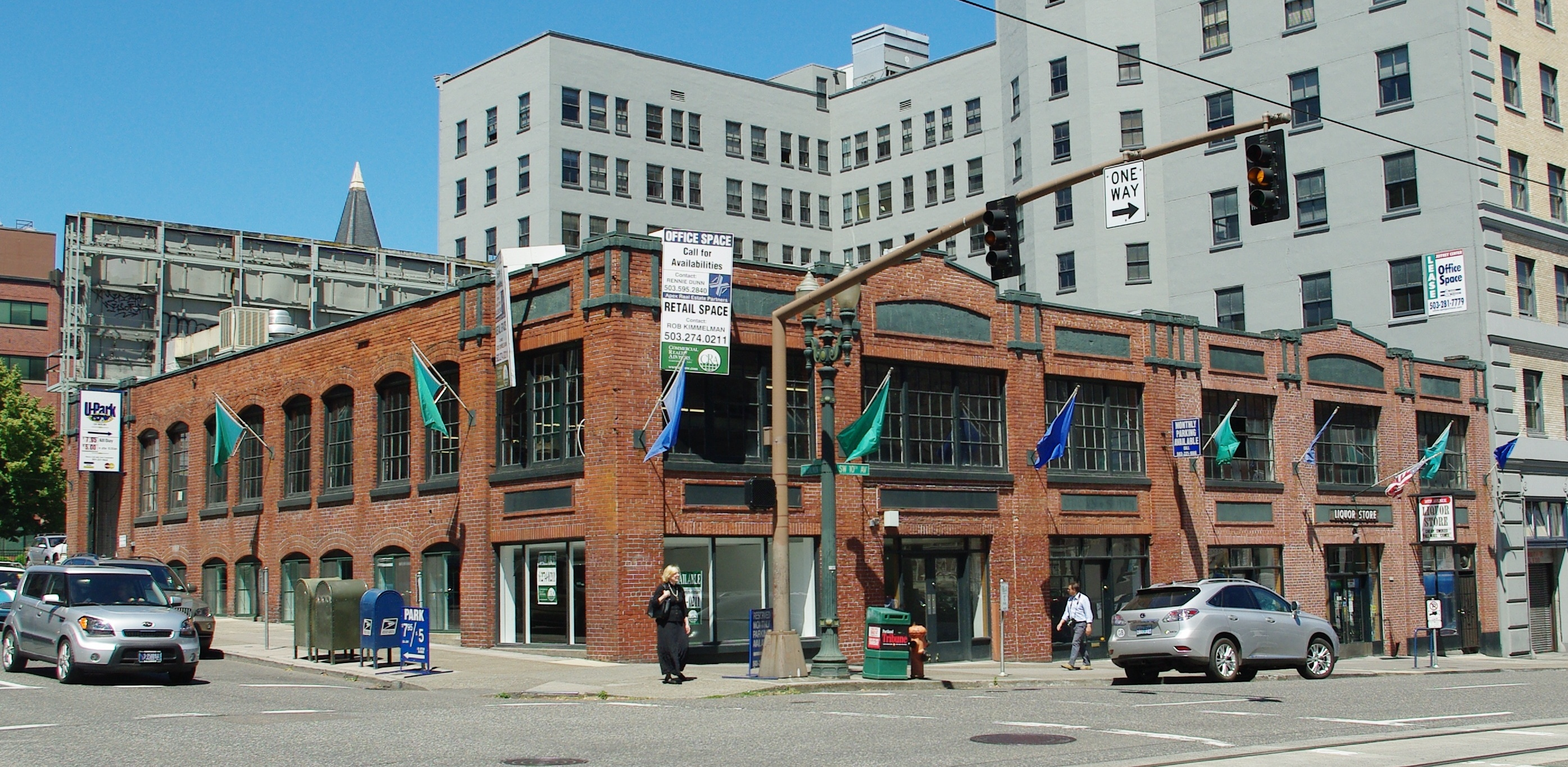
- The Auto Rest Garage in 2011

- Location within Portland, Oregon Location within Oregon Location within the United States
- Location: 925–935 SW 10th Avenue; Portland, Oregon
- Coordinates: 45°31′06″N 122°41′00″W
- Built: 1917
- Architect: Jacobberger & Smith
- Architectural style: Early Commercial
- NRHP reference No.: 96000997
- Added to NRHP: September 12, 1996

The Auto Rest Garage is a building complex located in downtown Portland, Oregon, listed on the National Register of Historic Places.

It was designed by Portland architects Jacobberger and Smith to serve as a showroom for Stutz and Columbia Six automobiles.

It has also been known as Medical Arts Garage.

== See also ==
- National Register of Historic Places listings in Southwest Portland, Oregon
