= St. Catherine Hall =

Building at Marylhurst University, Oregon, U.S.

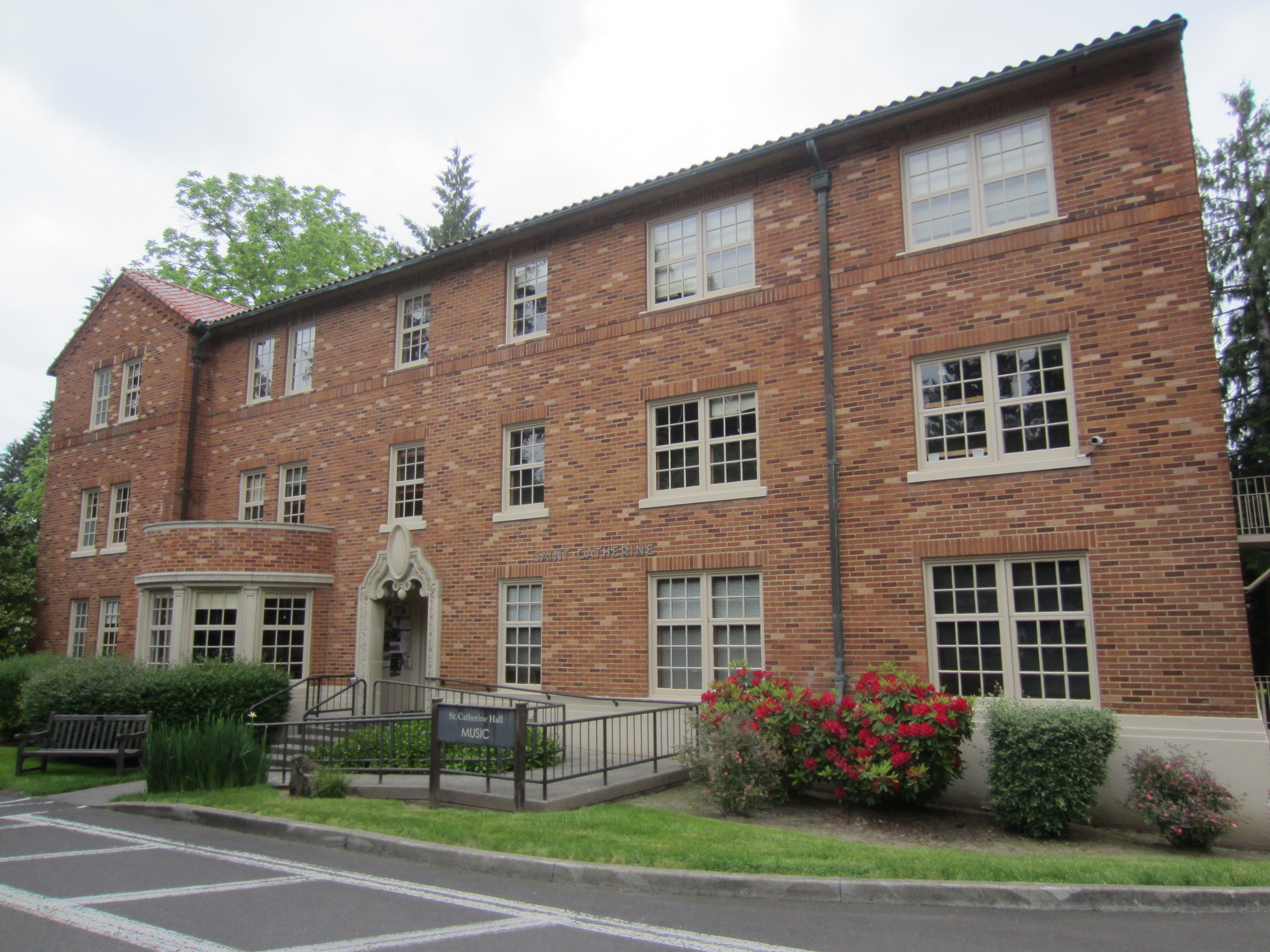
- The building's exterior in 2018
- Interactive map of the St. Catherine Hall area

General information
- Location: Portland, Oregon, United States
- Coordinates: 45°23′55.9″N 122°38′50.4″W

St. Catherine Hall, original known as St. Rose's Residence Hall, is a building on the now defunct Marylhurst University campus in Marylhurst, Oregon, United States. It was built during the 1930s. The university closed in late 2018.
