= Walter V. Smith House =

Historic building in Portland, Oregon, U.S.

- U.S. National Register of Historic Places
- Portland Historic Landmark
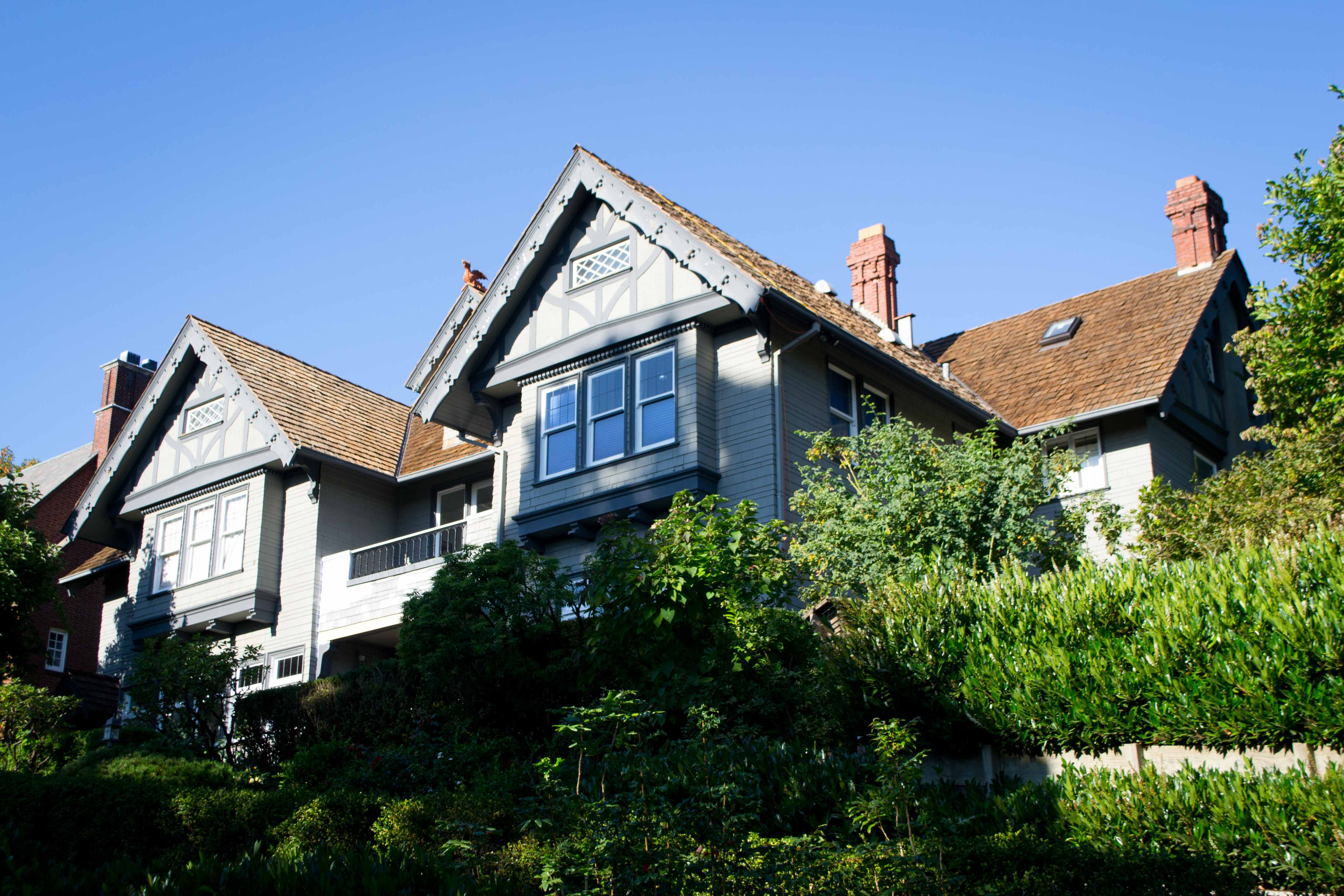
- The Walter V. Smith House in 2012

- Location within Portland, Oregon
- Location: 1943 SW Montgomery Drive; Portland, Oregon
- Coordinates: 45°30′49″N 122°41′55″W
- Area: 0.5 acres (0.20 ha)
- Built: 1898
- Architect: Joseph Jacobberger
- Architectural style: Bungalow/Craftsman
- NRHP reference No.: 93000020
- Added to NRHP: February 19, 1993

The Walter V. Smith House is a house located in southwest Portland, Oregon listed on the National Register of Historic Places.

== See also ==
- National Register of Historic Places listings in Southwest Portland, Oregon
