= Boschke–Boyd House =

Historic building in Portland, Oregon, U.S.

- U.S. National Register of Historic Places
- U.S. Historic district – Contributing property
- Portland Historic Landmark
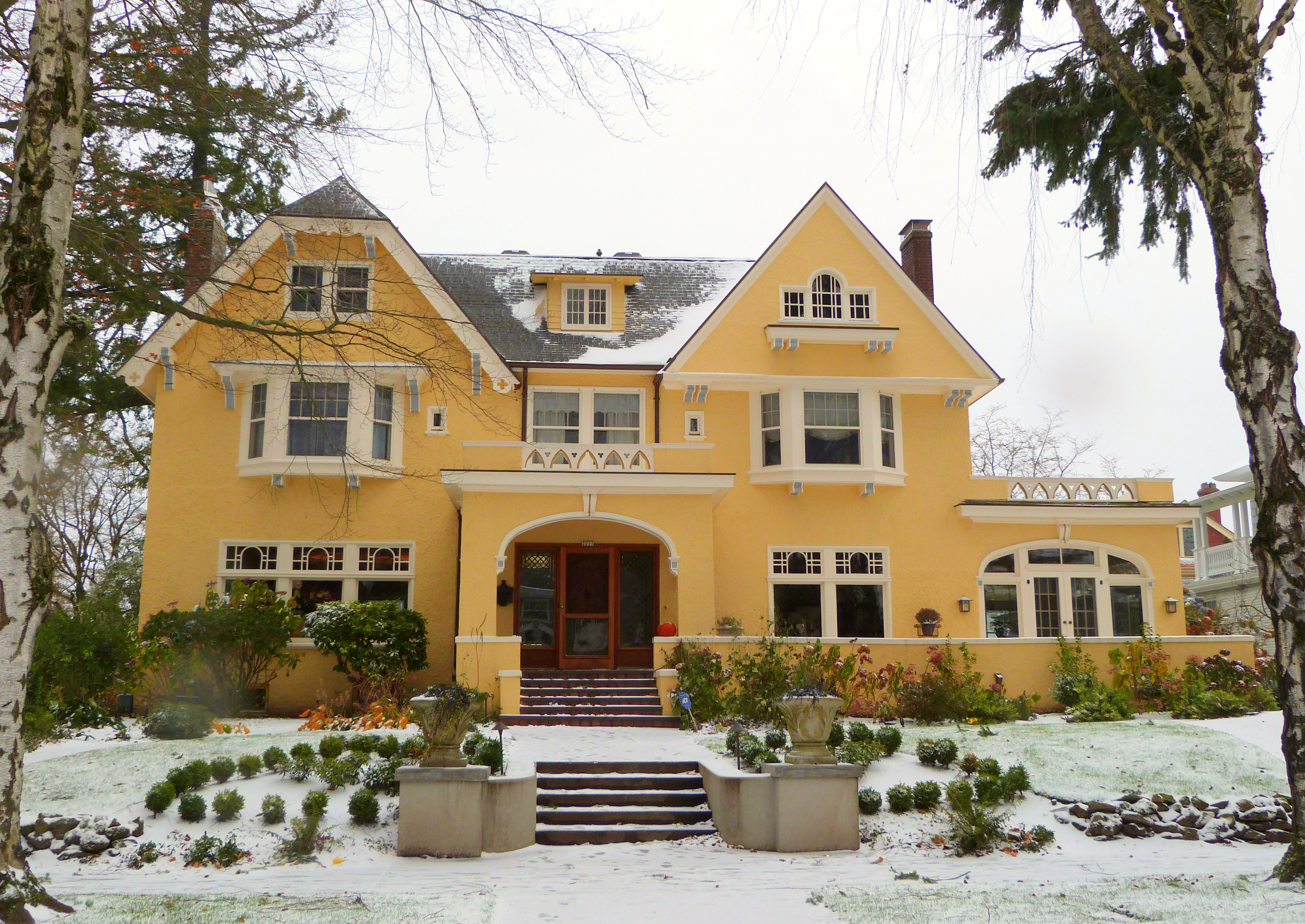
- The Boschke–Boyd House in 2016
- Location: 2211 NE Thompson Street; Portland, Oregon
- Coordinates: 45°32′21″N 122°38′34″W
- Area: 0.3 acres (0.12 ha)
- Built: c. 1910
- Built by: Moore Brothers
- Architect: Jacobberger and Smith
- Architectural style: Tudor Revival
- Part of: Irvington Historic District (ID10000850)
- NRHP reference No.: 05000094

Significant dates
- Added to NRHP: February 25, 2005
- Designated CP: October 22, 2010

The Boschke–Boyd House is a Tudor Revival style house in Northeast Portland, Oregon. It was listed on the National Register of Historic Places in 2005.

It was built around 1910, (Note: The house's National Register nomination document states both that it was built in 1910 and in 1912. The nomination document for the Irvington Historic District places the construction date at 1910, while different City of Portland records state 1910 or 1911.) and is "a fine example of the Tudor/Jacobethan style with Classical interior influences, designed by prominent and prolific architect, Joseph Jacobberger of the firm Jacobberger and Smith."

It was deemed significant for its association with William E. Boyd, the owner and general manager of the Benson Hotel in Portland for 36 years, who lived in the house for 28 years.

== See also ==
- National Register of Historic Places listings in Northeast Portland, Oregon
