= Frank E. Dooly House =

Historic building in Portland, Oregon, U.S.

- U.S. National Register of Historic Places
- Portland Historic Landmark
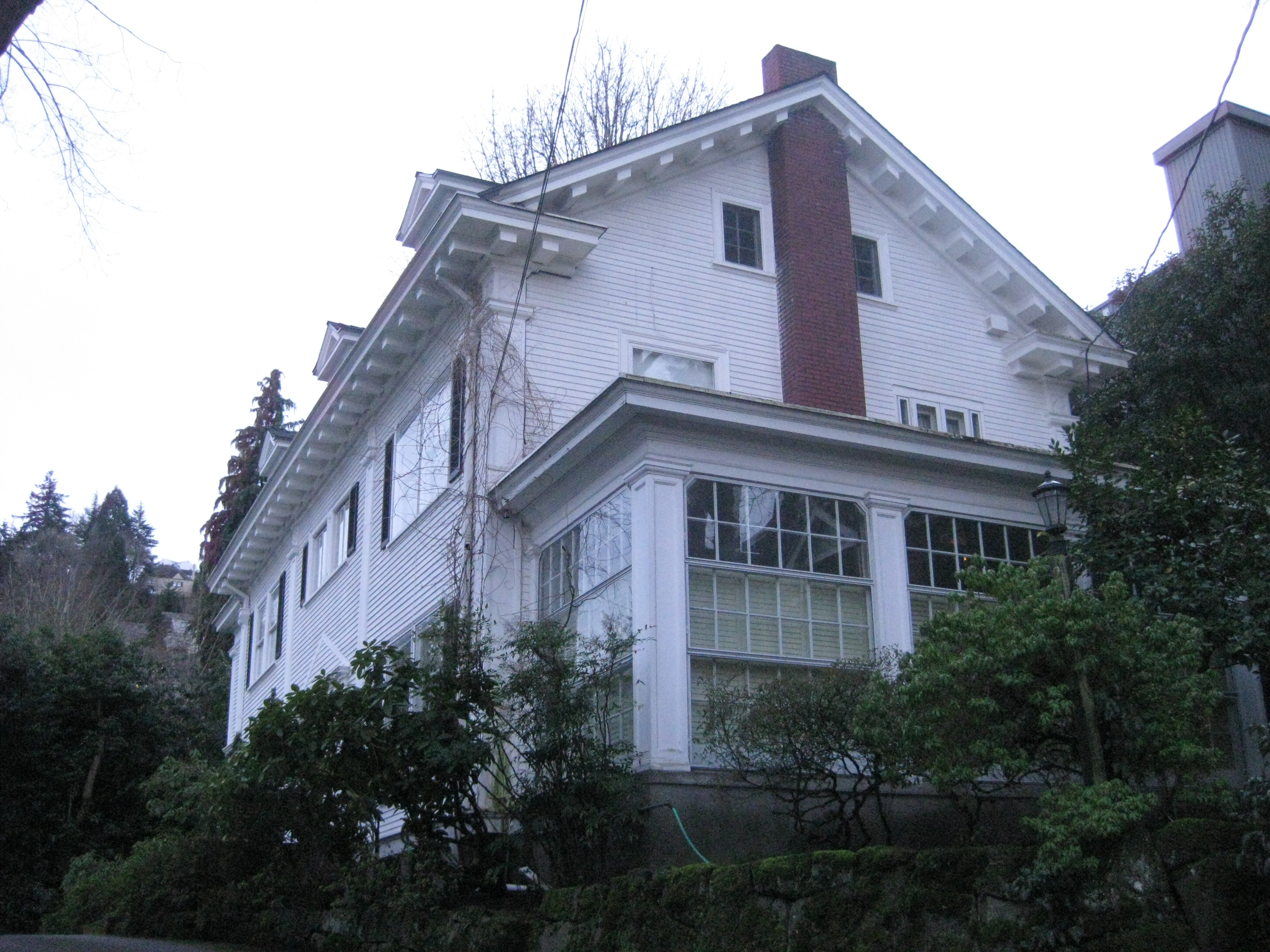

- Location within Portland, Oregon
- Location: 2670 NW Lovejoy Street; Portland, Oregon
- Coordinates: 45°31′45″N 122°42′21″W
- Built: 1910
- Architect: Josef Jacobberger
- Architectural style: Colonial Revival
- NRHP reference No.: 80003364
- Added to NRHP: October 24, 1980

The Frank E. Dooly House is a house located in northwest Portland, Oregon listed on the National Register of Historic Places.

== See also ==
- National Register of Historic Places listings in Northwest Portland, Oregon
