= Shoen Library =

Library at Marylhurst University, Oregon, U.S.

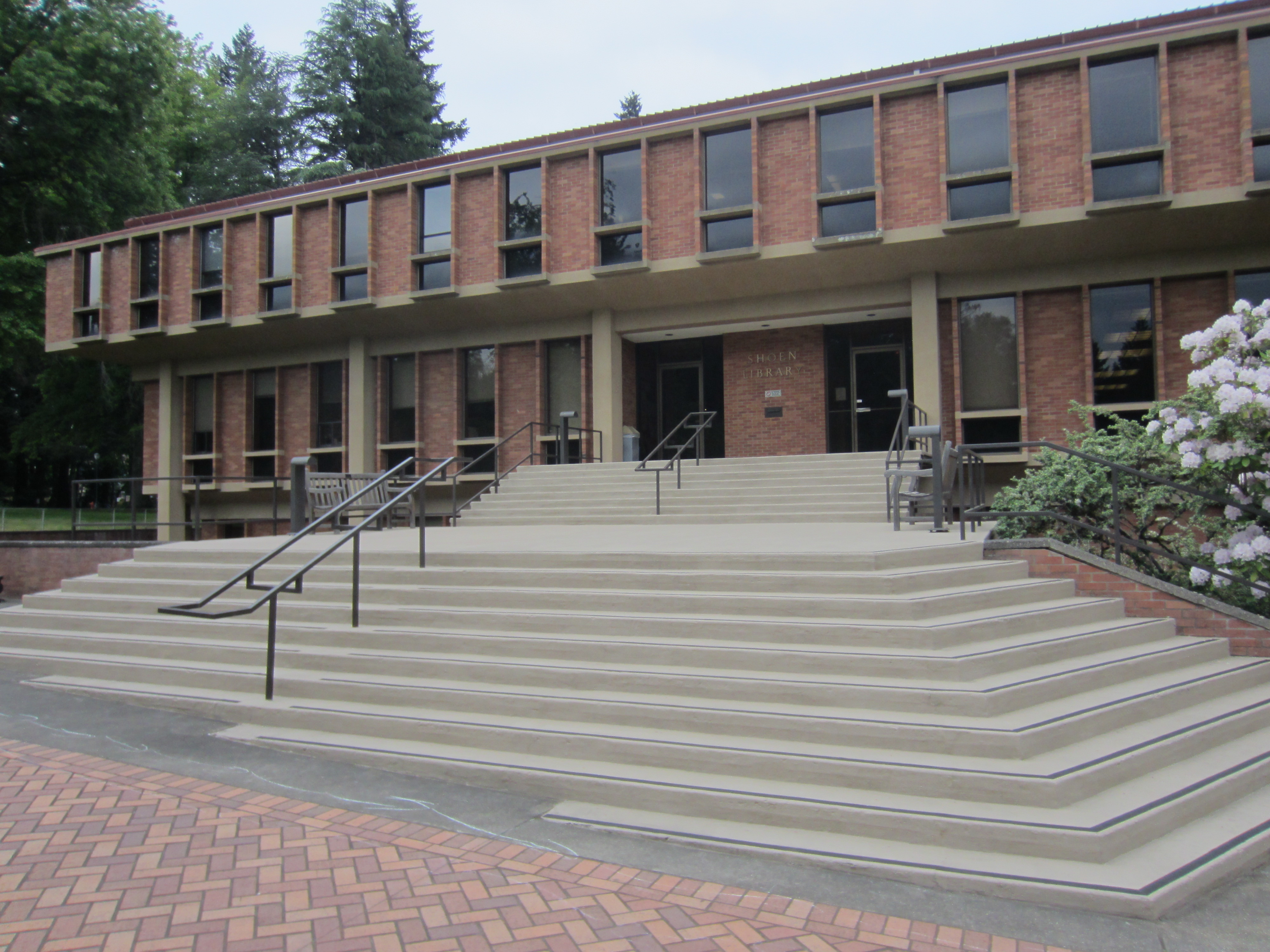
- 45°23′54″N 122°38′55″W
- Location: Marylhurst, Oregon, United States
- Type: Academic library
- Established: 1968
- Architects: Gordon & Hinchliff

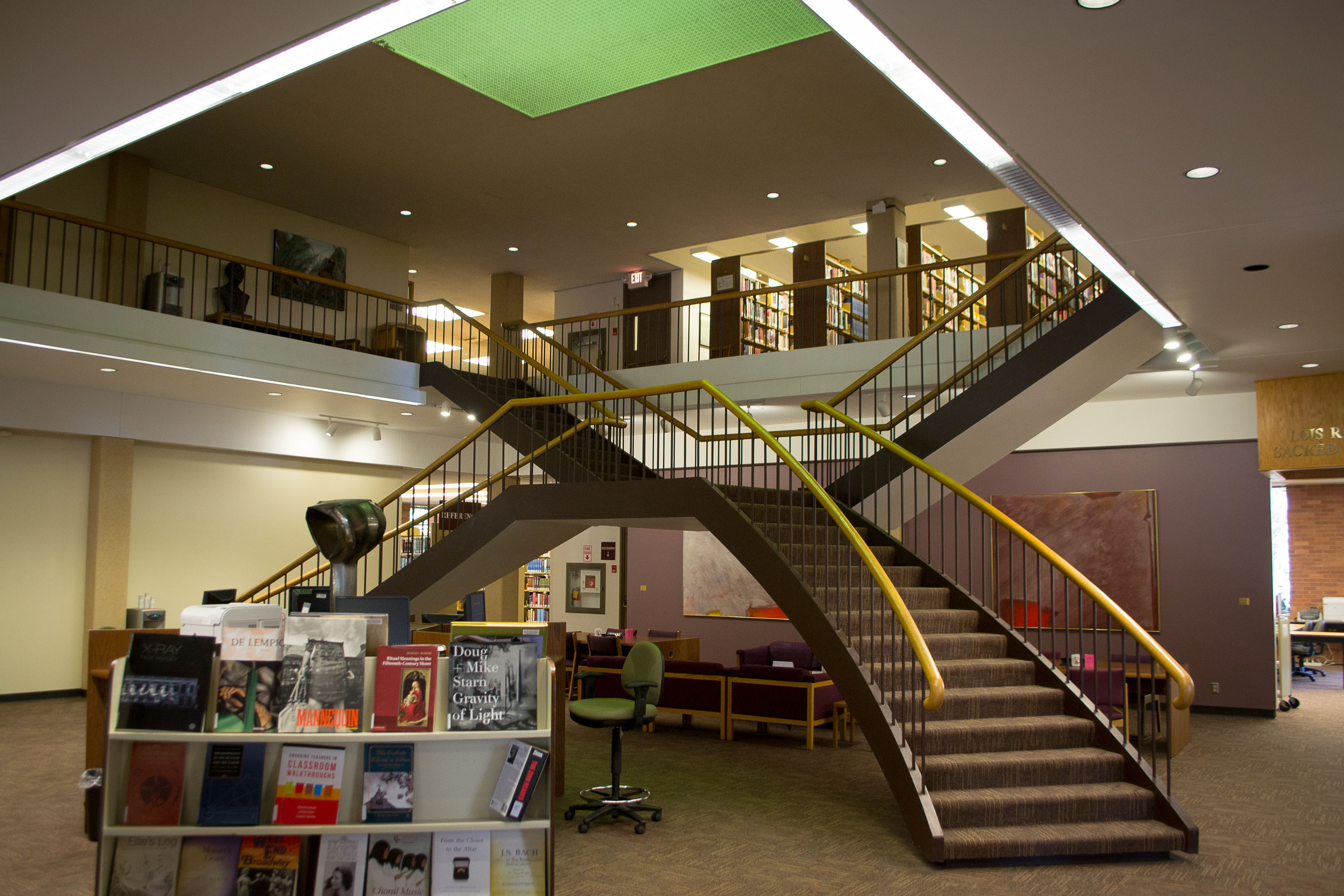
Interior view, 2013

The Shoen Library was a library on the now defunct Marylhurst University campus, in Marylhurst, Oregon, United States.

The library was designed by Walter Gordon and John Hinchliff, Portland architects. Its construction was funded by Sam Shoen Sr., in commemoration of his late wife, Anna Mary Carty Shoen, who attended the university. The building was completed in 1968.

The university closed in late 2018.

== See also ==
- List of libraries in Oregon
