= Monastery of the Precious Blood =

Historic building in Portland, Oregon, U.S.

- U.S. National Register of Historic Places
- Portland Historic Landmark
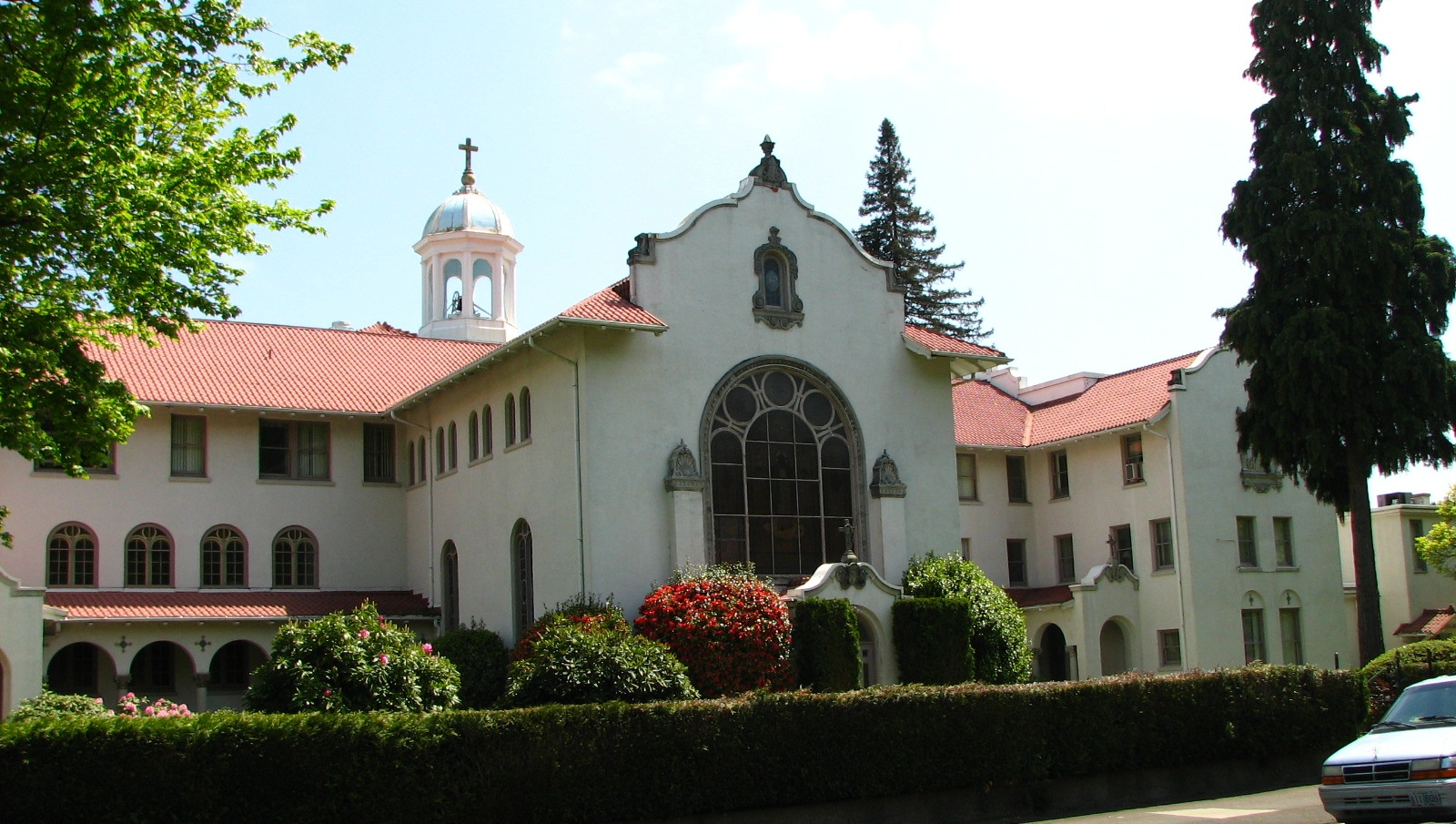
- Monastery of the Precious Blood in 2008
- Location: 1208 SE 76th Avenue; Portland, Oregon
- Coordinates: 45°30′51″N 122°35′05″W
- Area: 2.3 acres (0.93 ha)
- Built: 1923
- Architect: Jacobberger & Smith
- Architectural style: Mission/Spanish Revival
- NRHP reference No.: 85000294
- Added to NRHP: February 14, 1985

The Monastery of the Precious Blood is a building in southeast Portland, Oregon, United States, listed on the National Register of Historic Places. It is in the Montavilla neighborhood.

== See also ==
- National Register of Historic Places listings in Southeast Portland, Oregon
