= Flavia Hall =

Building at Marylhurst University, Oregon, U.S.

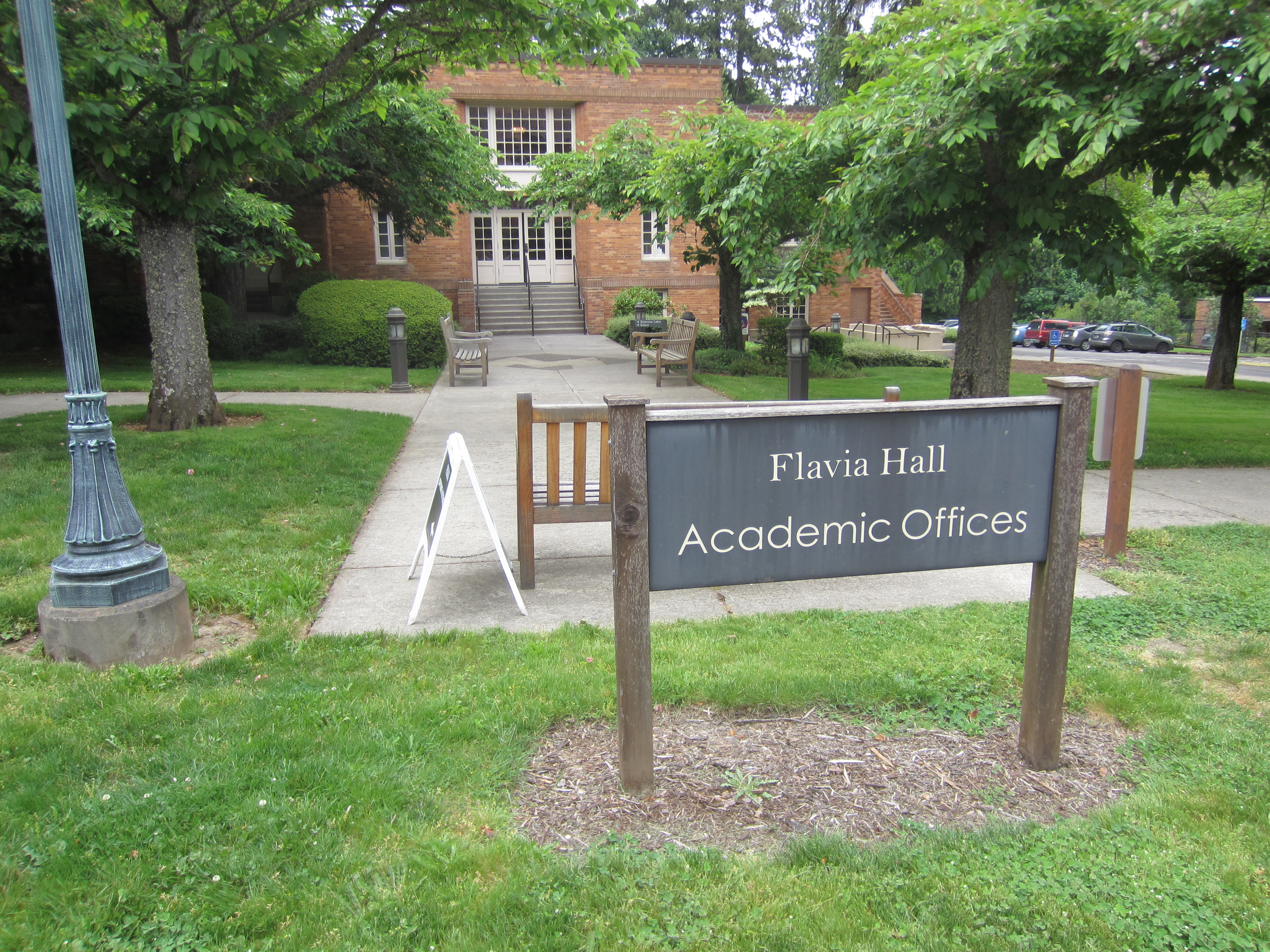
- Signage and the building's exterior in 2018
- Interactive map of the Flavia Hall area

General information
- Location: Marylhurst University, Marylhurst, Oregon, United States
- Coordinates: 45.39907°N 122.64786°W
- Completed: c. 1937

Flavia Hall is a building on the now defunct Marylhurst University campus, in Marylhurst, Oregon, United States. It was designed by architects Joseph Jacobberger and Alfred H. Smith, and completed c. 1937. The building originally served as a dormitory, and was later converted into an office building. The university closed in late 2018.

The university's Harry A. Merlo Science Center was unveiled in 1997 as part of the building's $3.2 million renovation.
