= Giesy–Failing House =

Historic building in Portland, Oregon, U.S.

- U.S. National Register of Historic Places
- Portland Historic Landmark
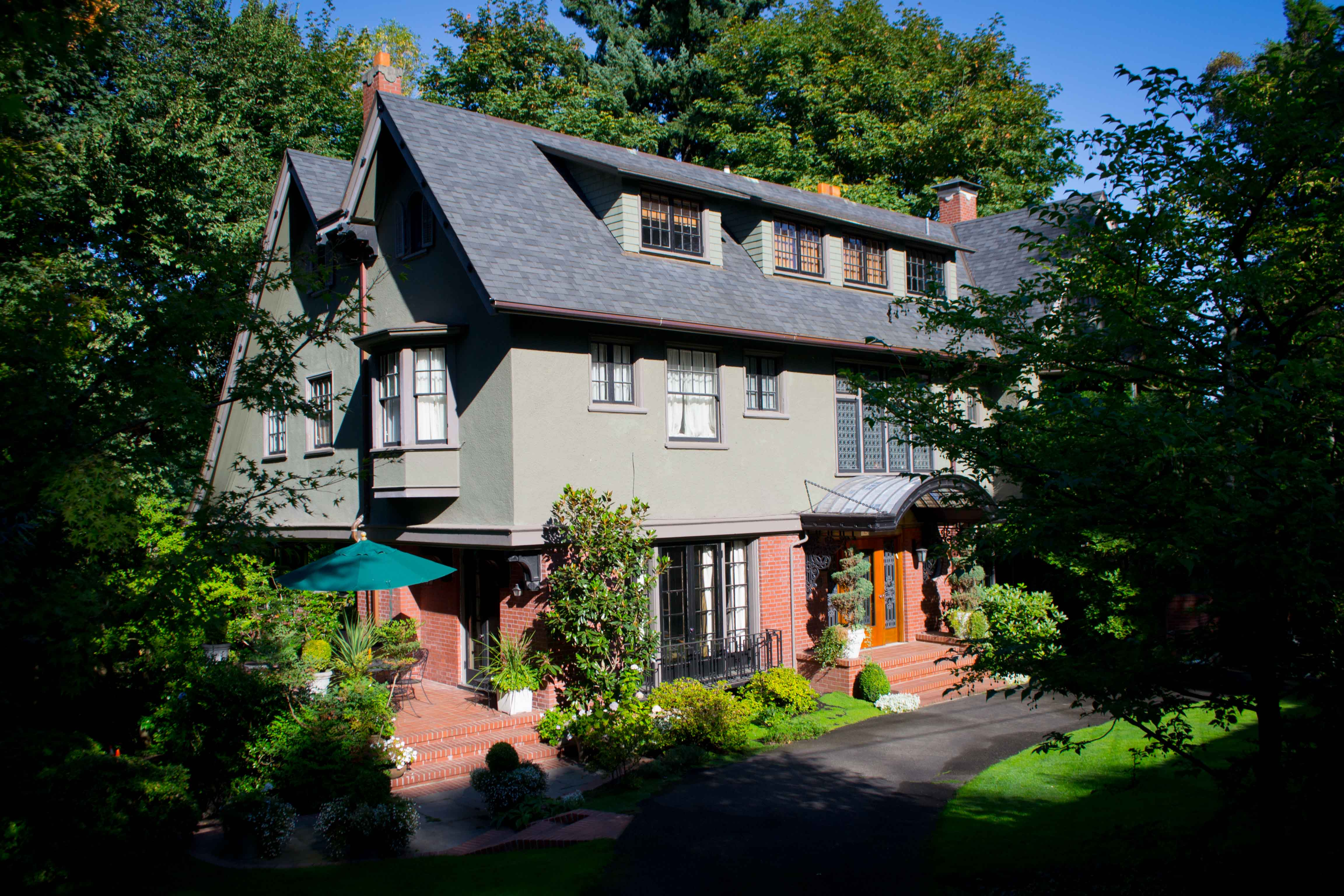
- The Giesy–Failing House in 2012.

- Location within Portland, Oregon
- Location: 1965 SW Montgomery Place; Portland, Oregon
- Coordinates: 45°30′49″N 122°41′58″W
- Area: 1.6 acres (0.65 ha)
- Built: 1921
- Architect: Jacobberger & Smith
- Architectural style: Late 19th And 20th Century Revivals, Arts & Crafts
- NRHP reference No.: 91000137
- Added to NRHP: February 22, 1991

The Giesy–Failing House is a house located southwest Portland, Oregon listed on the National Register of Historic Places. It is located in the Southwest Hills neighborhood.

== See also ==
- National Register of Historic Places listings in Southwest Portland, Oregon
