= Daniel J. Malarkey House =

Historic building in Portland, Oregon, U.S.

- U.S. National Register of Historic Places
- Portland Historic Landmark
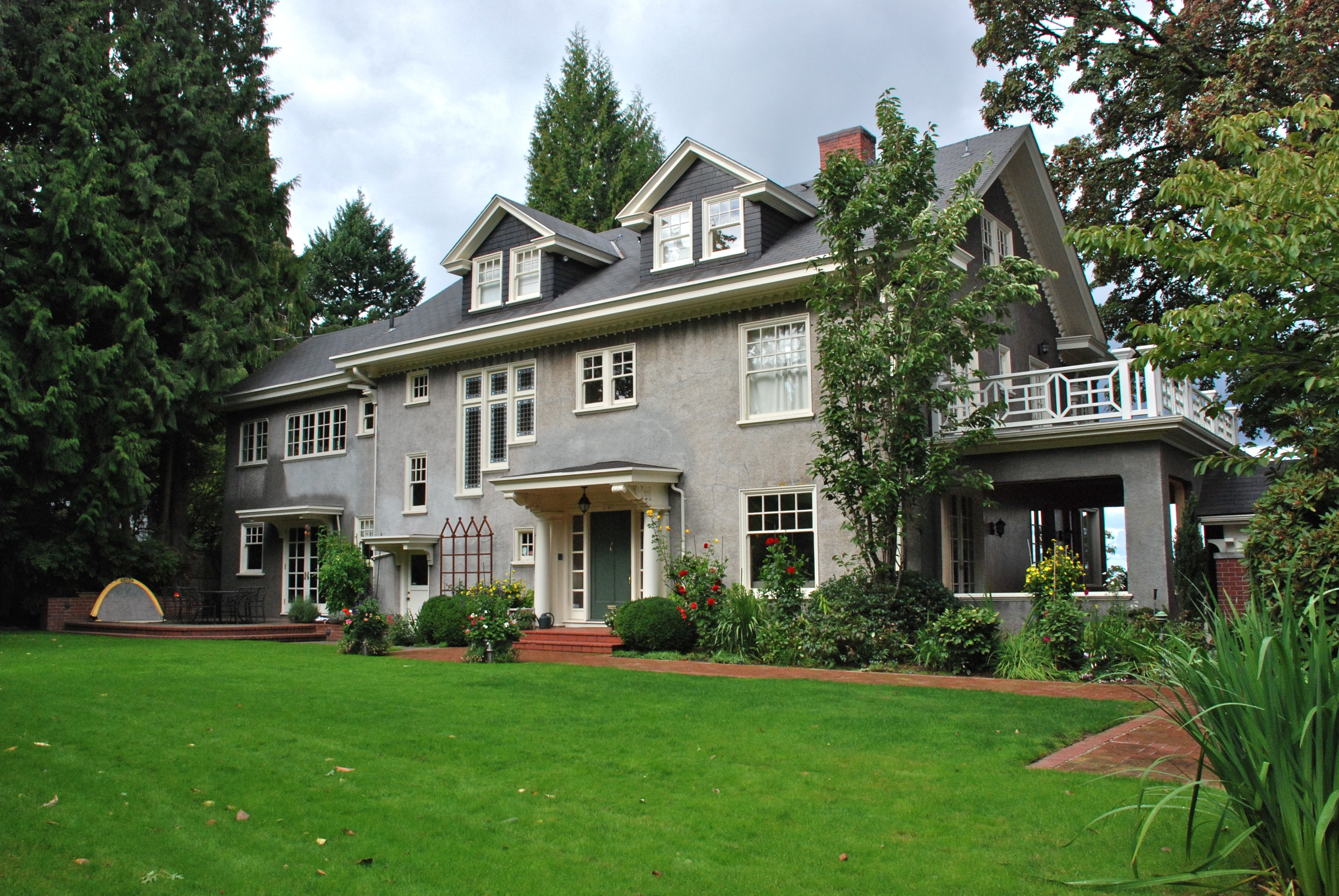
- The Daniel J. Malarkey House in 2013.

- Location within Portland, Oregon
- Location: 2141 SW Hillcrest Place; Portland, Oregon
- Coordinates: 45°30′27″N 122°42′10″W
- Area: 0.33 acres (0.13 ha)
- Built: 1909
- Architect: Joseph Jacobberger
- Architectural style: Arts and Crafts
- NRHP reference No.: 93000450
- Added to NRHP: May 27, 1993

The Daniel J. Malarkey House is a historic house located in Portland, Oregon. It was the home of noted legislator and trial lawyer Dan Malarkey (1870–1939) from its construction in 1909 until his death. Associated with Progressive causes, Malarkey presided over the Oregon Senate during its 1913 session, when the legislature passed landmark bills establishing a minimum wage and regulating public utilities. In private legal practice, he played a key part in the ultimately successful battle against the 1922 Oregon School Law.

The house was designed by Portland-based architect Joseph Jacobberger (1867–1930), who became noted as one of the leading architects of the Pacific Northwest during his long career (1890–1930).

The house was listed on the National Register of Historic Places in 1993.

== See also ==
- National Register of Historic Places listings in Southwest Portland, Oregon
