= Markle–Pittock House =

Historic building in Portland, Oregon, U.S.

- Markle-Pittock House
- U.S. National Register of Historic Places
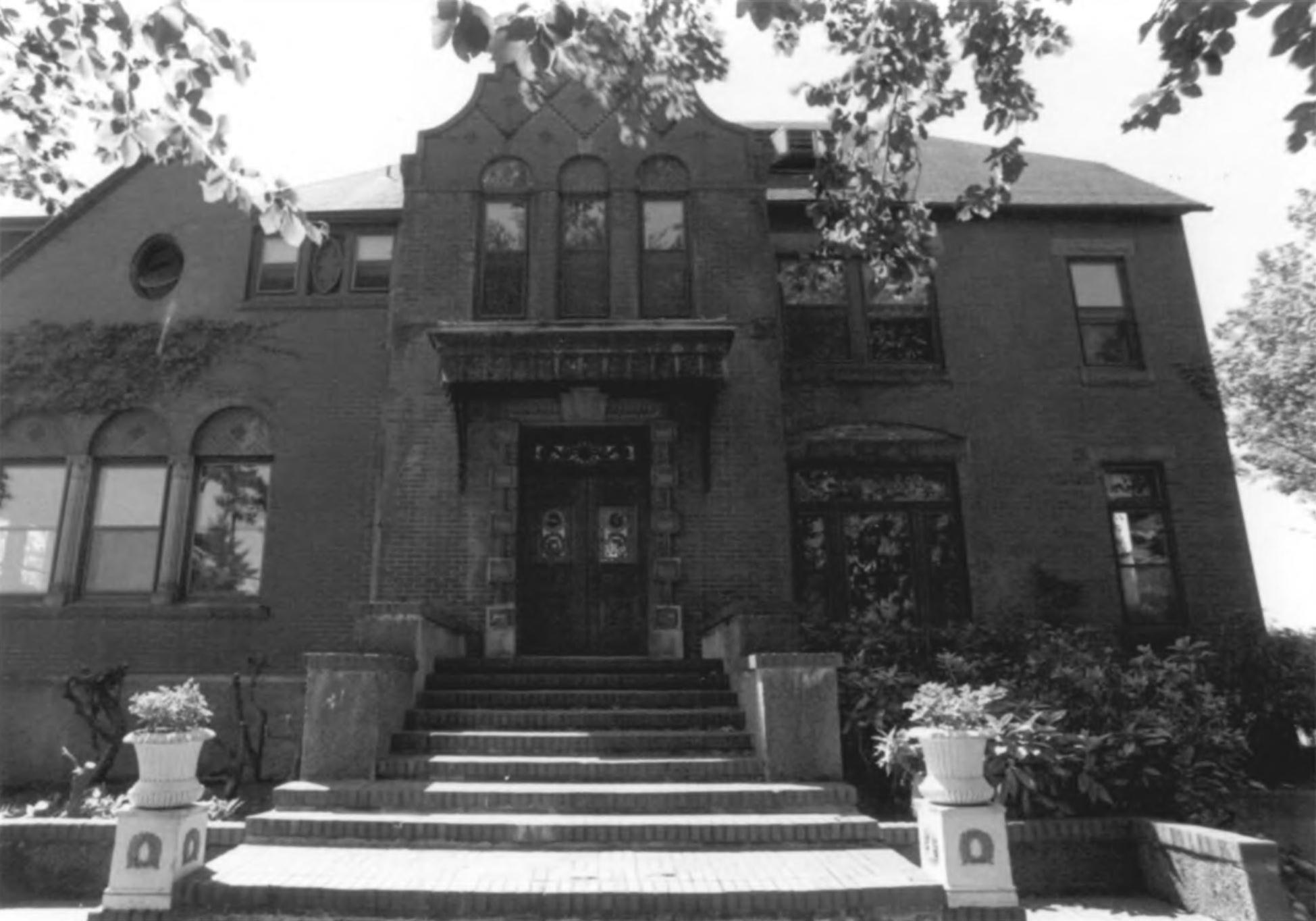
- The house's exterior in 1984

- Location within Portland, Oregon Location within the United States
- Location: 1816 SW Hawthorne Terr., Portland, Oregon
- Coordinates: 45°30′26″N 122°41′51″W
- Area: 1.2 acres (0.49 ha)
- Built: 1889, 1928
- Architect: Jacobberger & Smith
- Architectural style: Tudor Revival, Queen Anne, Jacobethan Revival
- NRHP reference No.: 85000368
- Added to NRHP: February 28, 1985

The Markle–Pittock House is a historic house located in southwest Portland, Oregon listed on the National Register of Historic Places.

It was built as a Queen Anne style house during 1888-89 and was prominent as the largest house in Portland. It was substantially modified in 1928 to Jacobethan Revival design by architects Jacobberger and Smith.

== See also ==
- National Register of Historic Places listings in Southwest Portland, Oregon
