= James C. and Mary A. Costello House =

Historic building in Portland, Oregon, U.S.

- U.S. National Register of Historic Places
- U.S. Historic district – Contributing property
- Portland Historic Landmark
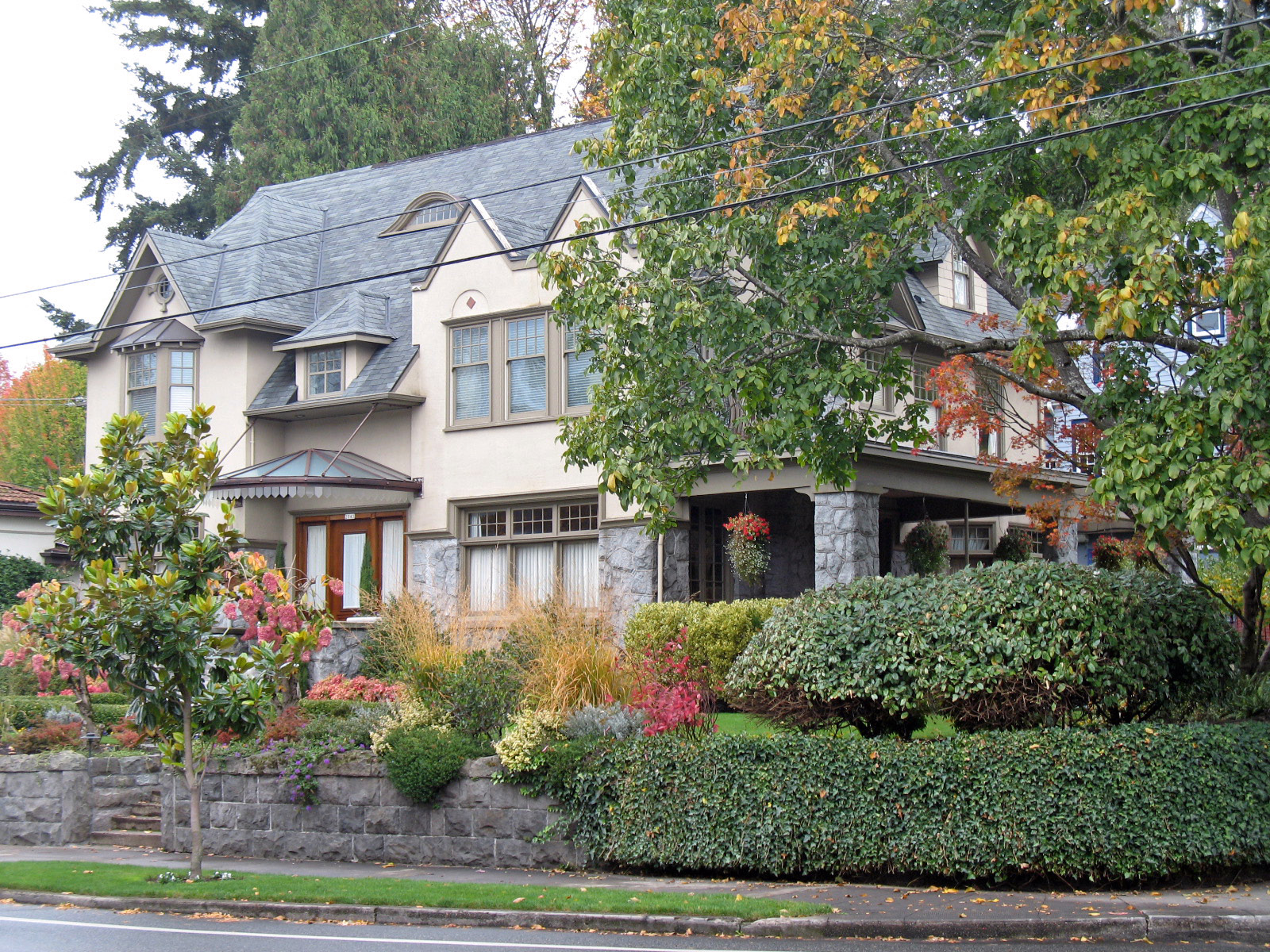
- The house in 2009

- Location within the United States Location within Oregon Location within Portland, Oregon
- Location: 2043 NE Tillamook Street; Portland, Oregon
- Coordinates: 45°32′16″N 122°38′41″W
- Built: 1910
- Architect: Joseph Jacobberger
- Architectural style: Arts and Crafts
- Part of: Irvington Historic District (ID10000850)
- NRHP reference No.: 01001068
- Added to NRHP: September 28, 2001

The James C. and Mary A. Costello House is a historic building located in the Irvington neighborhood Portland, Oregon, United States. Built in 1910, it is an excellent example of the work of prominent architect Joseph Jacobberger at the height of the Arts and Crafts style in Portland residential architecture. During his prolific career Jacobberger contributed greatly to the spread of that style in Portland. James C. Costello was a developer who helped shape Irvington, and chose to locate his own home there.

The house was entered on the National Register of Historic Places in 2001.

== See also ==
- National Register of Historic Places listings in Northeast Portland, Oregon
