= McDougall–Campbell House =

Historic building in Portland, Oregon, U.S.

- U.S. National Register of Historic Places
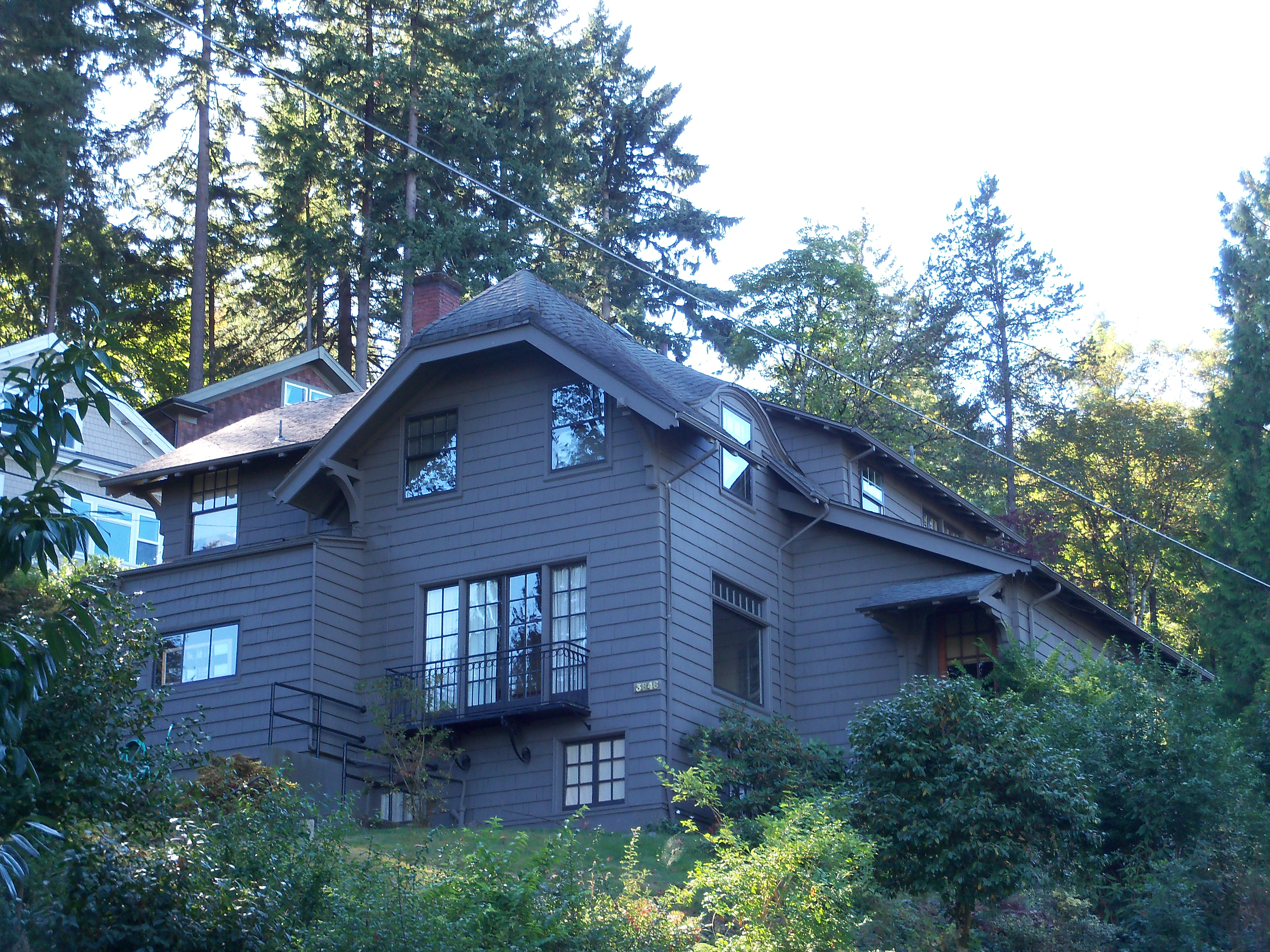

- Location within Oregon Location within the United States
- Location: 3846 NW Thurman Street; Portland, Oregon
- Coordinates: 45°32′23″N 122°43′20″W
- Area: less than one acre
- Built: 1910
- Architect: Joseph Jacobberger
- Architectural style: Late 19th And Early 20th Century American Movements, Late 19th And 20th Century Revivals
- NRHP reference No.: 05000095
- Added to NRHP: February 25, 2005

The McDougall–Campbell House is an English Arts and Crafts-Style house in Portland, Oregon, United States. It has elements of the English Cottage style incorporated into the design. The house was designed by architect Josef Jacobberger for Gilbert H. Durham and built in 1910 or earlier.

Dominant are characteristics of the Arts and Crafts Movement, including use of natural materials (wood, brick, tile, stone), built-in cabinetry, shingles, a variety of window types, asymmetrical floor plans, multiple steeply pitched gables, an open porch, brick chimneys and rooms with an open flow extending to the exterior.

Important are elements of the English Cottage style including the eyebrow dormer, wrought iron work and the jerkinhead or clipped gable that is an architectural feature whose origins trace back to the thatched roof of Medieval England.

Landscaping contributes to the setting of the McDougall–Campbell House. Trees, shrubs, stone steps, lawn areas, walkways, a terracotta tiled patio, and terraces make up the yard, which is informal, overgrown and reminiscent of an English garden. A rock retaining wall runs the length of the property.
