= Lombard Automobile Buildings =

Historic building in Portland, Oregon, U.S.

- U.S. National Register of Historic Places
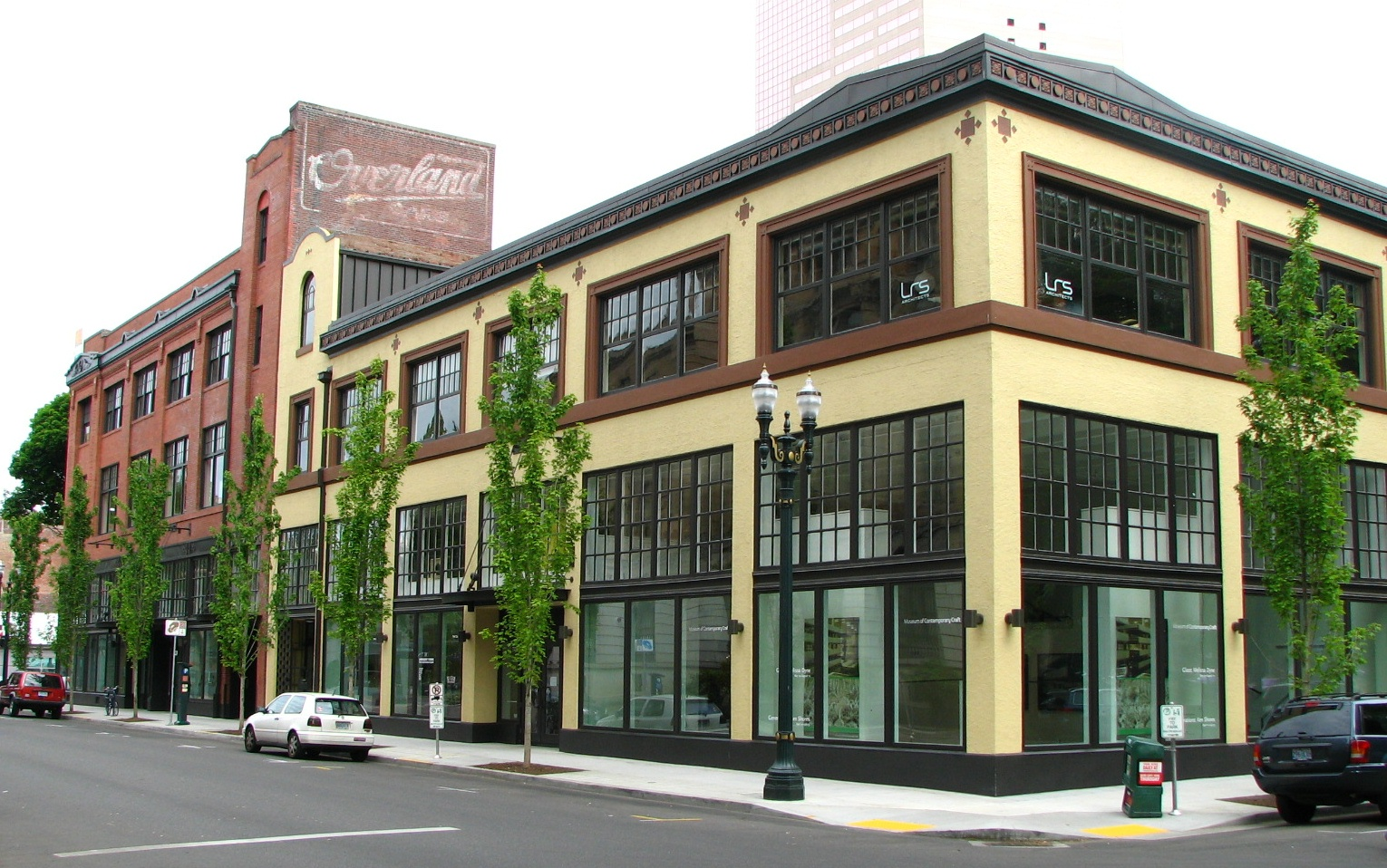

- Location within Portland, Oregon Location within Oregon Location within the United States
- Location: 123-35 NW Broadway; 134 NW 8th Avenue; Portland, Oregon
- Coordinates: 45°31′27″N 122°40′41″W
- Built: 1915
- Architect: Joseph Jacobberger
- Architectural style: Early Commercial
- NRHP reference No.: 05001553
- Added to NRHP: January 26, 2006

The Lombard Automobile Buildings, located in northwest Portland, Oregon, are listed on the National Register of Historic Places.

== See also ==
- National Register of Historic Places listings in Northwest Portland, Oregon
