= Calumet Hotel (Portland, Oregon) =

Historic building in Portland, Oregon, U.S.

- U.S. National Register of Historic Places
- Portland Historic Landmark
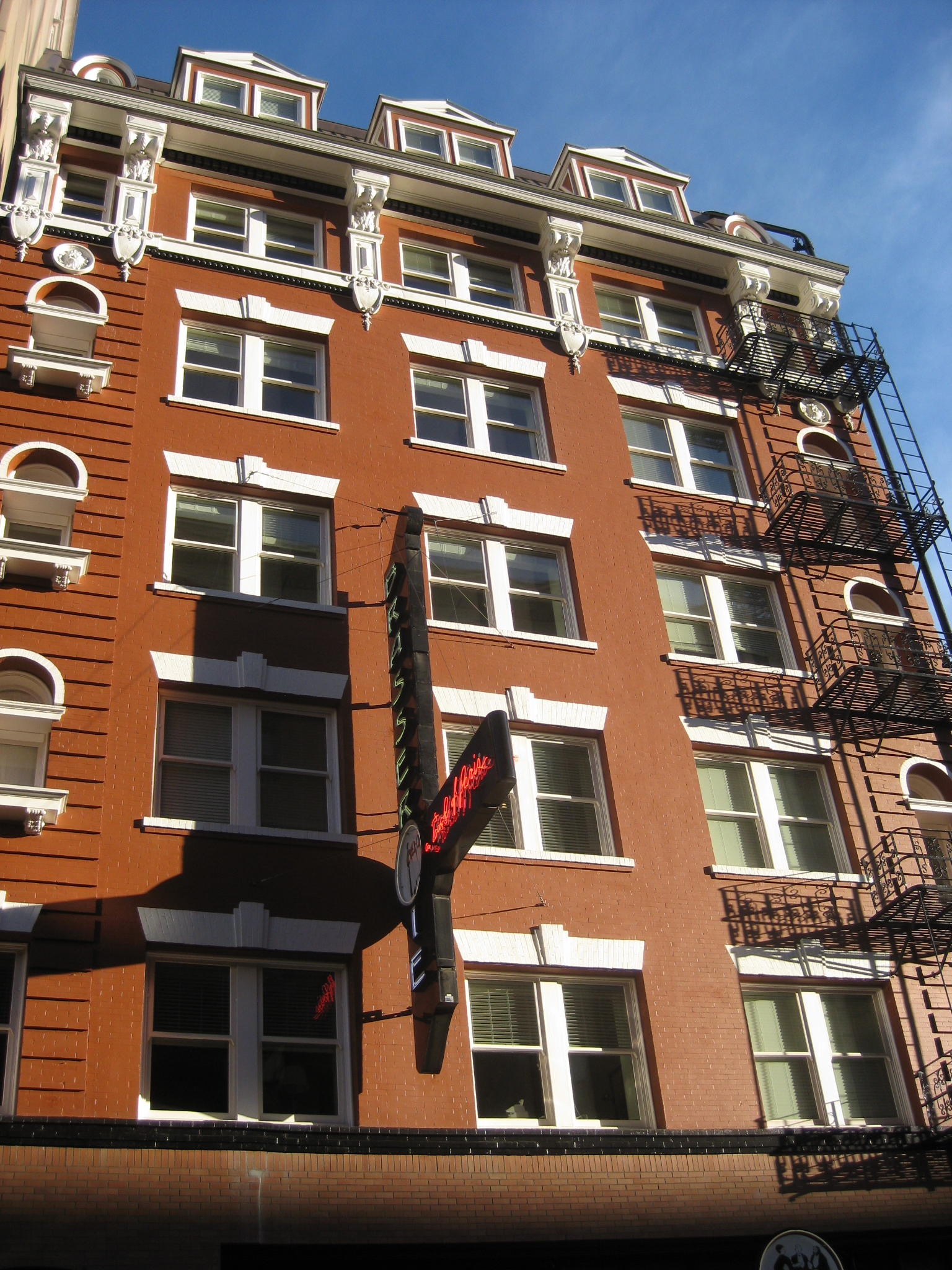

- Location within Portland, Oregon
- Location: 620 SW Park Avenue; Portland, Oregon
- Coordinates: 45°31′11″N 122°40′49″W
- Built: 1907
- Architect: Joseph Jacobberger
- Architectural style: Late 19th and 20th Century Revivals, French Renaissance
- NRHP reference No.: 84003073
- Added to NRHP: September 21, 1984

The Calumet Hotel, also known as the Esquire Hotel, is a former hotel building located in downtown Portland, Oregon, that is listed on the National Register of Historic Places. The building was changed from a commercial hotel to a residential hotel for low-income residents in the 1930s. At some point, it took the name Esquire Hotel. By the time of its nomination to the National Register, in 1983, it was vacant. The building was renovated in 2008–09 and is now known as "The Esquire" apartments.

== See also ==
- National Register of Historic Places listings in Southwest Portland, Oregon
