= Marian Hall =

- U.S. National Register of Historic Places
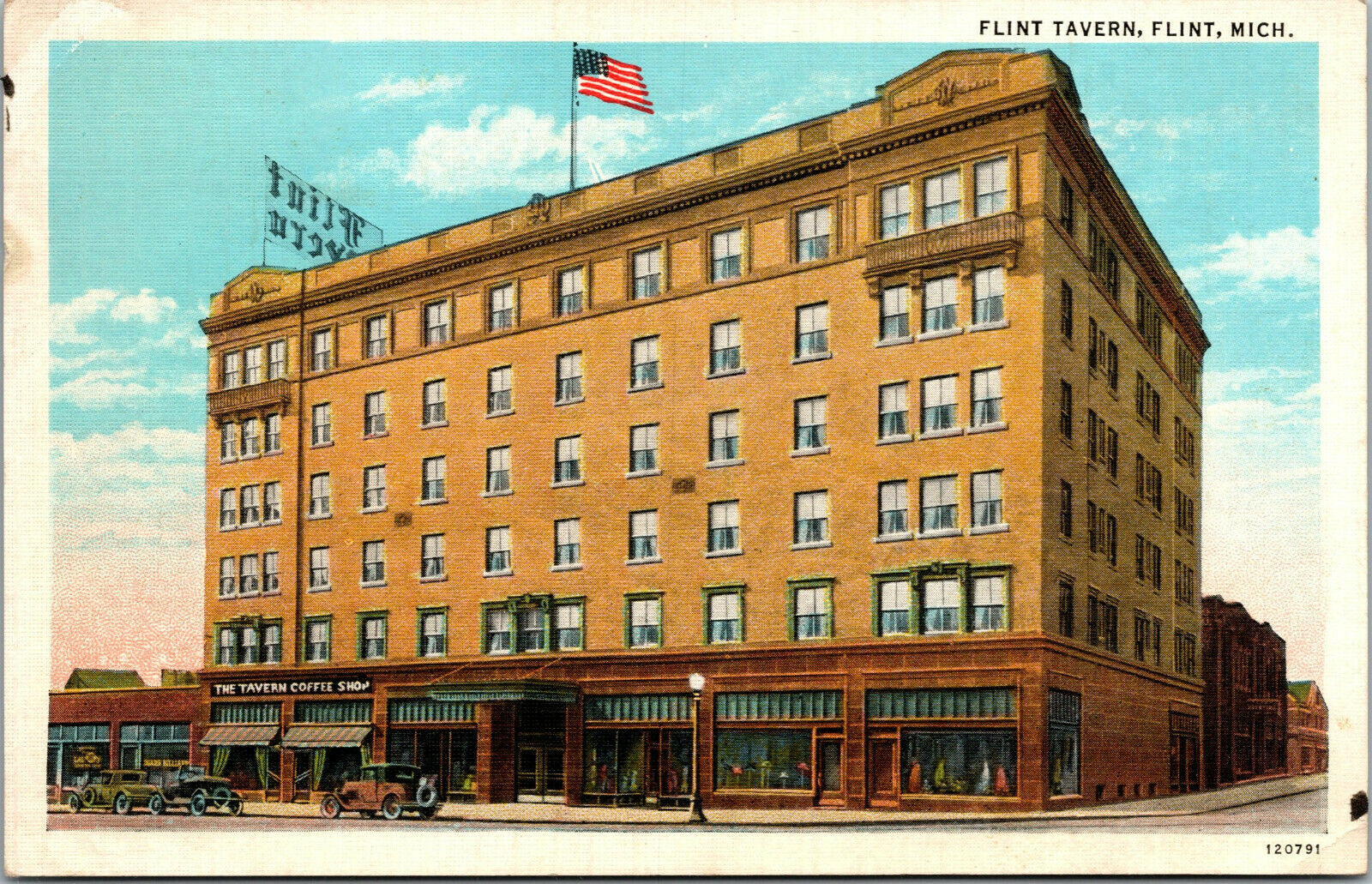
- Marian Hall, c. 1930
- Interactive map
- Location: 529 Martin Luther King Ave. Flint, Michigan
- Coordinates: 43°1′15″N 83°41′42″W
- Built: 1927
- Built by: Carl S. Barry Company
- Architect: Charles N. Agree
- Architectural style: Classical Revival
- NRHP reference No.: 100011635
- Added to NRHP: April 7, 2025

Marian Hall (constructed as the Flint Tavern Hotel) is a former hotel and retirement home located at 529 Martin Luther King Avenue in Flint, Michigan. It was listed on the National Register of Historic Places in 2025.

== History ==
In the 1920s, Flint grew rapidly, spurring significant development of the business district. In 1927, the Frankay Corporation commissioned Charles N. Agree to design this hotel. Construction began in 1927, and the Flint Tavern Hotel opened in March 1928. The six commercial spaces were immediately occupied, and the hotel itself was quickly successful. Even during the Great Depression, the hotel and associated restaurant were a popular spot for wedding receptions and business conventions. The hotel was remodeled in 1952.

In 1958, the hotel was sold to the Roman Catholic Diocese of Lansing, who closed the hotel and conducted renovations. In 1959, the building reopened as Marian Hall, "a home for older men and women". The retirement home was run by Sisters of the Precious Blood, a group of Catholic nuns. The home operated over the next few decades. However, by the 1980s, the number of residents was declining, with only 35 in 1989. The Diocese planned to close the facility, but an agreement was reached with a local realtor, Piper Realty Company, to assume management of the building.

Piper operated the building until 1996, when it was sold to Flint Odyssey House, a substance-abuse treatment organization. Odyssey operated in the building through 2023. As of 2024, renovations are planned to the building to turn it into apartments.

== Description ==
Marian Hall is a six-story rectangular Classical Revival structure with a single story addition on one side. The upper floors create a U shape. The ground floor is six bays wide with a center entrance, and is clad in stucco. The surrounding bays contain store front entrances. Above, the upper floors are clad in an orange brown brick. The two end bays project slightly, with three double-hung windows per floor. The bats in between have regularly spaced double-hung windows, with the second floor center by containing a group of three double-hung windows.
