= B.P. John Administrative Building =

Building at Marylhurst University, Oregon, U.S.

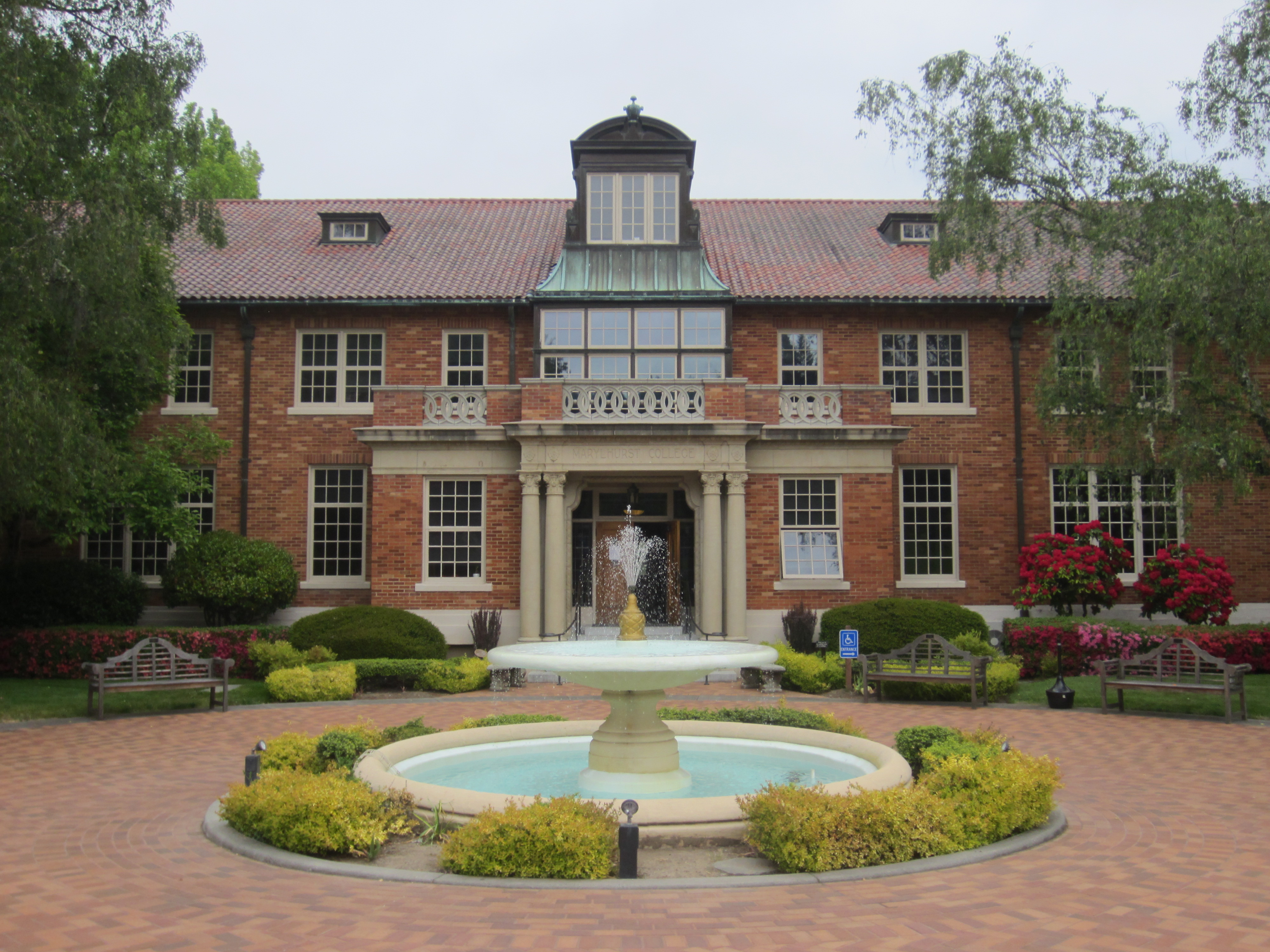
- The building's main entrance in 2018
- Interactive map of the B.P. John Administrative Building area

General information
- Type: Building
- Location: Marylhurst University, Marylhurst, Oregon, United States
- Coordinates: 45°23′53.4″N 122°38′51.7″W
- Completed: 1929

Design and construction
- Architect: Joseph Jacobberger

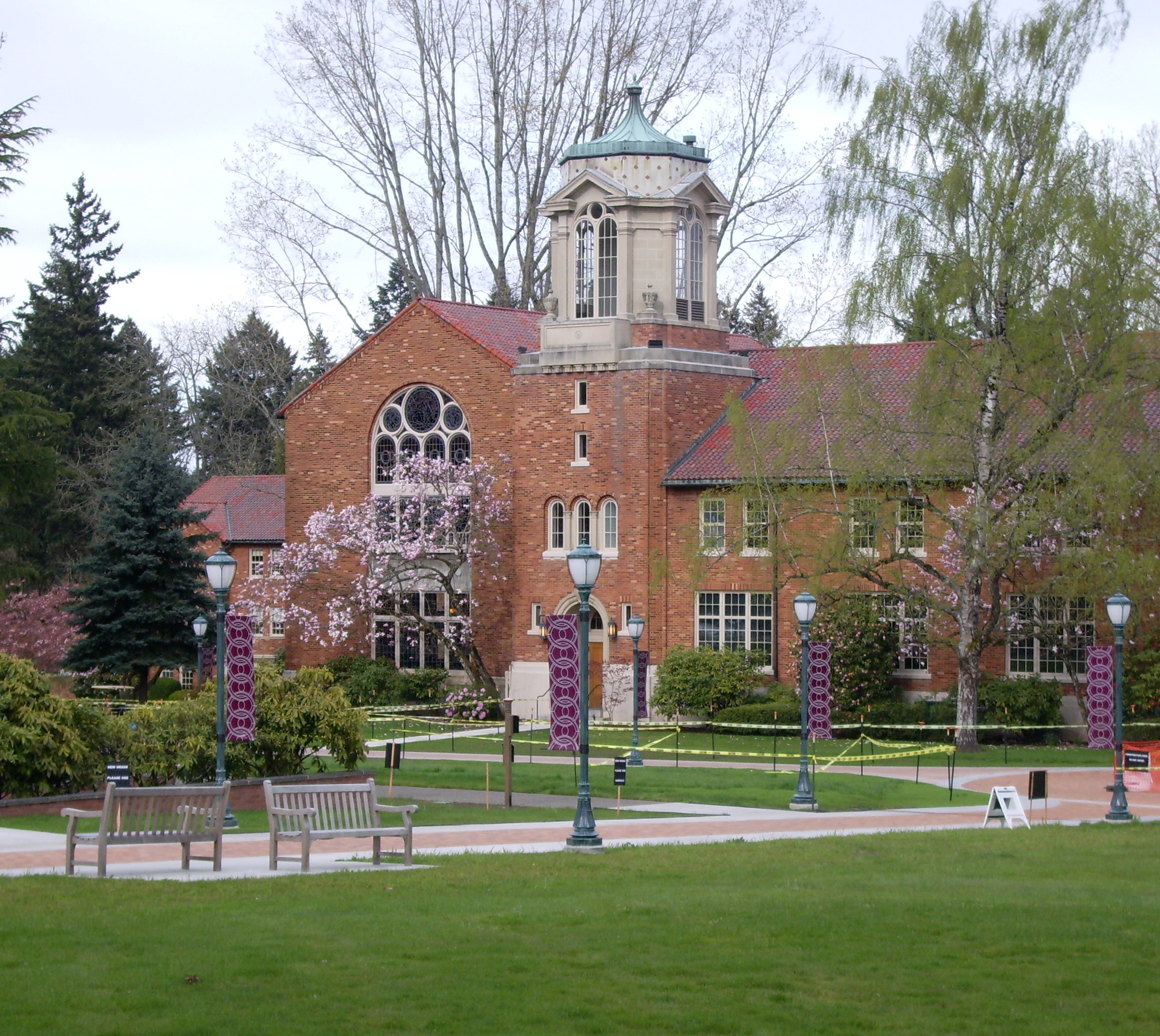
Bell tower, 2008

The B.P. John Administrative Building is a building on the now defunct Marylhurst University campus, in Marylhurst, Oregon, United States. It was designed by Joseph Jacobberger and completed in 1929. The building originally housed the entire college, and included an auditorium, a bakery and cafeteria, a chapel, classrooms, a gymnasium, a library, and a swimming pool. The second floor originally had living areas for the Sisters of the Holy Names. The 100-seat music venue Wiegand Hall was added during the 1990s. In 2013, the building's chapel was renovated. The university closed in late 2018.
