= Joseph Jacobberger Country House =

House in Multnomah County, Oregon, U.S.

- U.S. National Register of Historic Places
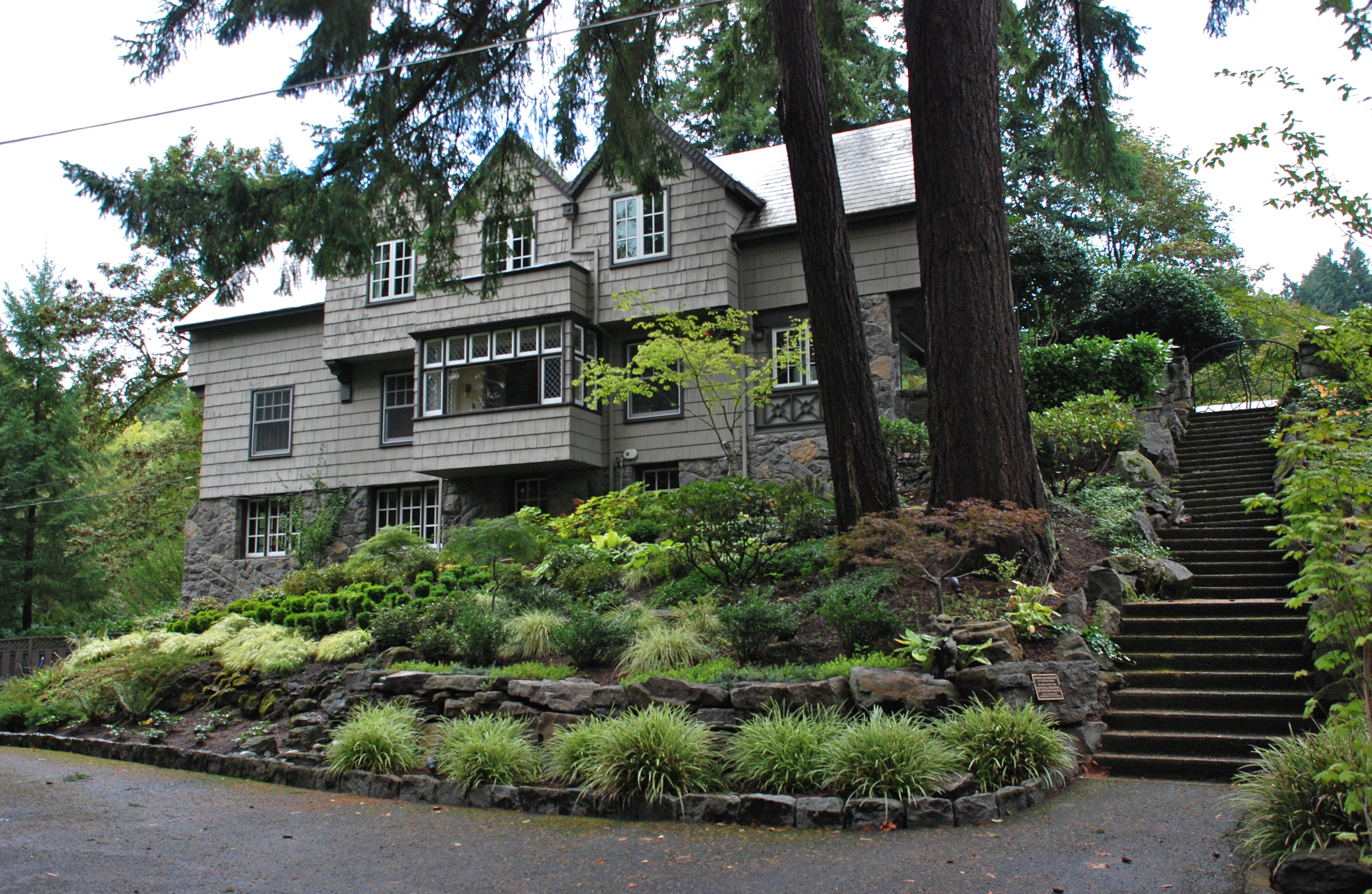
- Joseph Jacobberger Country House in 2013

- Location within Portland, Oregon
- Location: 5545 SW Sweetbriar Street; Portland, Oregon
- Coordinates: 45°29′56″N 122°44′04″W
- Area: 0.54 acres (0.22 ha)
- Built: 1917
- Architect: Joseph Jacobberger
- Architectural style: Arts and Crafts
- NRHP reference No.: 10001171
- Added to NRHP: January 24, 2011

The Joseph Jacobberger Country House is a historic house in the Hillsdale district of Multnomah County, Oregon, United States, just outside the Portland municipal boundary. Leading Portland architect and civic activist Joseph Jacobberger (1869–1930) designed this Arts and Crafts style house for his family in 1916, and lived in it from 1917 until his death. He resided here through the height of his career, a period during which he designed over 250 commissions that shaped the face of Portland, including homes, schools, colleges, churches, a cathedral, commercial buildings, and others.

The house was listed on the National Register of Historic Places in 2011.

== See also ==
- Josef Jacobberger House
- National Register of Historic Places listings in Multnomah County, Oregon
