= Joseph Jacobberger =

American architect

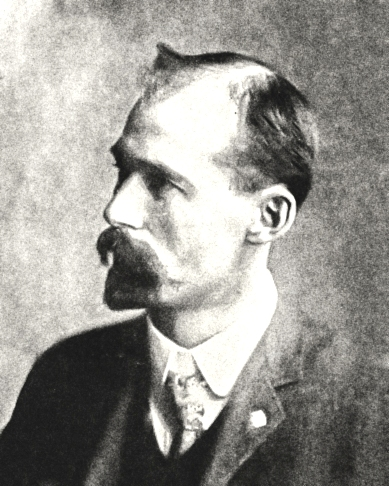
- Born: March 19, 1869; Alsace
- Died: March 18, 1930 (aged 60); Portland, Oregon
- Education: Creighton University
- Occupation: Architect
- Spouse(s): Anna Lillis (1863 – 1908); Catherine Lillis (1874 – 1912); Rose Manassa (1879 – 1955)
- Children: Mary, Hubert, Francis, Vincent, Bertrand, Margaret
- Parent(s): Hubert Jacobberger, Catherine Jacobberger (née Jacoberger)
- Practice: Jacobberger and Smith
- Buildings: B.P. John Administrative Building; Calumet Hotel; Daniel J. Malarkey House
- Projects: Early buildings and campus design at the University of Portland

Joseph Jacobberger (March 19, 1869 – March 18, 1930) was an American architect based in Portland, Oregon. He partnered with Alfred H. Smith in the firm Jacobberger and Smith.

== Early life ==
Jacobberger was born on March 19, 1869, in Lautenbach, Haut-Rhin, Alsace, France to cousins Hubert Jacobberger and Josephine Jacobberger. The Jacobbergers immigrated to the United States in 1872. The family moved to Omaha, Nebraska, where Hubert Jacobberger became a building contractor. Joseph Jacobberger later attended Creighton University, graduating c1887.

He worked briefly in Minneapolis then worked with A.R. Saunders in Tacoma prior to settling in Portland in 1890. In Portland, Jacobberger began as a draftsman in the firm Whidden & Lewis.

== Career ==
Jacobberger left Portland in the 1890s and worked with Frank Chamberlain Clark in the Los Angeles offices of Frank Roehrig. He returned to Portland in 1900 and began to build his own practice.

An early contract was the campus design at the University of Portland, known in 1901 as Columbia University. Jacobberger began an association with the Catholic Archdiocese of Portland that resulted in several design projects, although during his first decade as an independent architect in Portland, Jacobberger preferred residential designs and small commercial projects.

In 1912 Jacobberger formed a partnership with Alfred H. Smith that would continue until 1930. The firm Jacobberger and Smith was responsible for many buildings listed on the National Register of Historic Places.

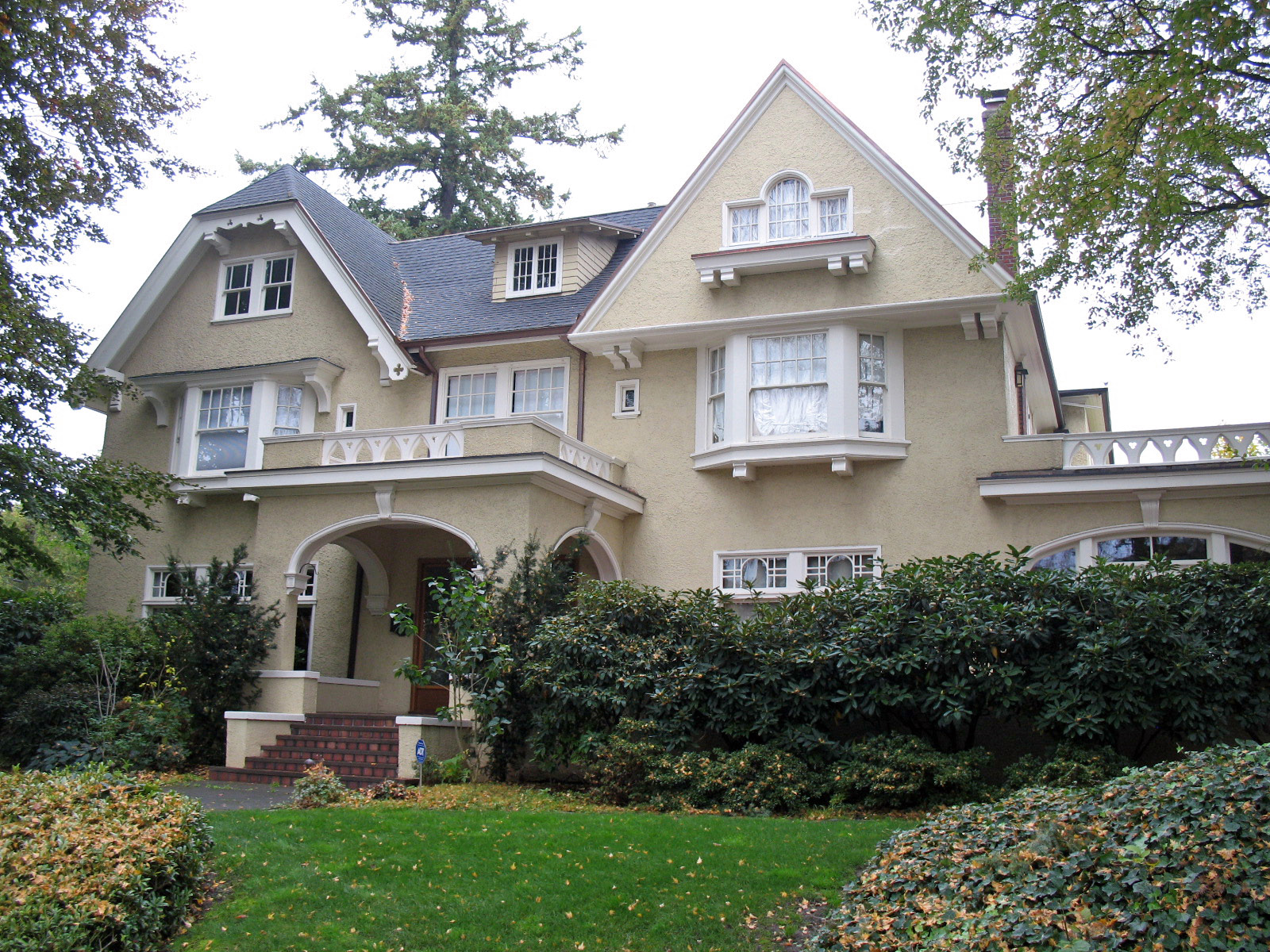
Boschke-Boyd House

== Death ==
Jacobberger suffered a heart attack in 1930. While recovering, he had another attack and died one day before his 61st birthday.

== Works ==
A partial list of Jacobberger's and the firm's works include (with individual or joint attribution):

- Josef Jacobberger House (1906–07), 1502 SW. Upper Hall St. Portland, Oregon (Jacobberger, Josef), NRHP-listed
- Daniel J. Malarkey House (1909), 2141 SW Hillcrest Pl., Portland, (Jacobberger, Joseph), NRHP-listed
- Boschke-Boyd House (1910), 2211 NE Thompson St. Portland, (Jacobberger and Smith), NRHP-listed
- Markle-Pittock House (1928 renovation), 1816 SW Hawthorne Terr., Portland, (Jacobberger & Smith), NRHP-listed
- Auto Rest Garage, 925-935 10th Ave., SW, Portland, (Jacobberger & Smith), NRHP-listed
- Calumet Hotel, 620 SW Park St., Portland, (Jacobberger, Jacob), NRHP-listed
- James C. and Mary A. Costello House, 2043 NE Tillamook, Portland, (Jacobberger, Joseph), NRHP-listed
- Frank E. Dooly House, 2670 NW Lovejoy St., Portland, (Jacobberger, Josef), NRHP-listed
- Giesy-Failing House, 1965 SW. Montgomery Pl., Portland, (Jacobberger & Smith; Jacobberger, Joseph), NRHP-listed
- Hibernian Hall, 128 NE Russell, Portland, (Jacobberger, Joseph & Smith, Alfred), NRHP-listed
- Joseph Jacobberger Country House, 5545 SW Sweetbriar Street, near Portland, NRHP-listed
- Lombard Automobile Buildings, 123-35 NW Broadway;134 NW 8th Ave., Portland, (Jacobberger, Joseph), NRHP-listed
- McDougall-Campbell House, 3846 N.W. Thurman St., Portland, (Jacobberger, Joseph), NRHP-listed
- Monastery of the Precious Blood, 1208 SE 76th, Portland, (Jacobberger & Smith), NRHP-listed
- Jacques and Amelia Reinhart House, 7821 S.E. Thirtieth Ave., Portland, (Jacobberger & Smith), NRHP-listed
- Dr. James Rosenfeld House, 2125 SW Twenty-first Ave., Portland, (Jacobberger, Joseph), NRHP-listed
- St. Mary Roman Catholic Church (Eugene, Oregon), 1062 Charnelton St., Eugene, Oregon (Jacobberger, Joseph).
- Alfred H. and Mary E. Smith House, 1806 SW High St., Portland, (Jacobberger, Joseph), NRHP-listed
- Walter V. Smith House, 1943 SW. Montgomery Dr., Portland, (Jacobberger, Joseph), NRHP-listed
- Villa St. Rose, 597 N. Dekum St., Portland, (Jacobberger, Joseph), NRHP-listed
- Frank M. Warren House, 2545 NW. Westover Rd., Portland, (Jacobberger, Joseph), NRHP-listed
- Aquinas Hall, B.P. John Administrative Building, and Flavia Hall, Marylhurst University
- Emma Austin House, 49 Briarwood Rd., Lake Oswego, (Jacobberger, Joseph, attributed), Classic Houses of Portland, Oregon, William Hawkins III. Timber Press Inc., 2005. Page
