= Josef Jacobberger House =

Historic building in Portland, Oregon, U.S.

- U.S. National Register of Historic Places
- Portland Historic Landmark
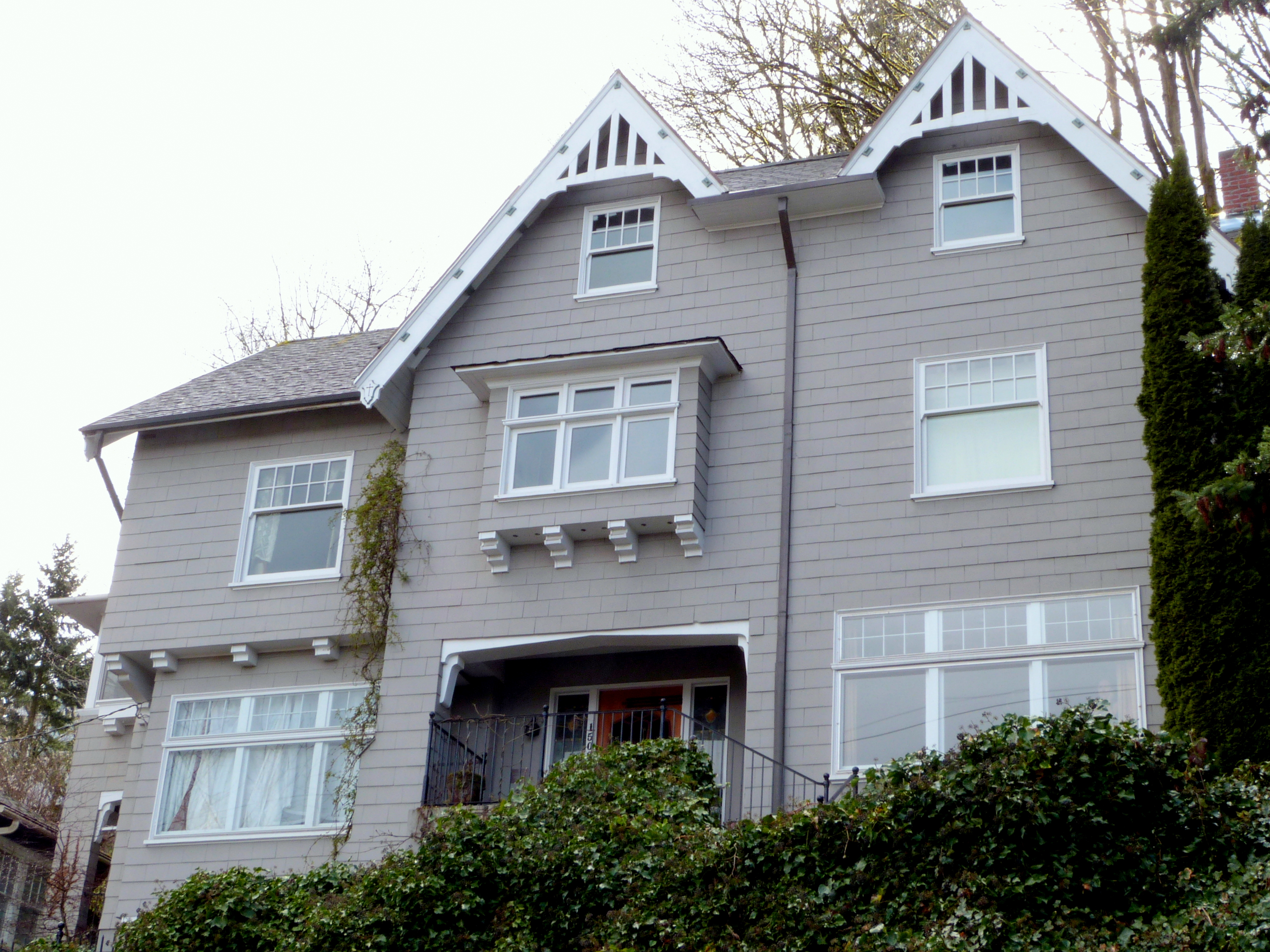
- The Jacobberger House in 2013.

- Location within Portland, Oregon
- Location: 1502 SW Upper Hall Street; Portland, Oregon
- Coordinates: 45.512592°N 122.692078°W
- Area: 0.2 acres (0.081 ha)
- Built: 1906
- Architect: Jacobberger, Josef; Povey, David L.
- Architectural style: Late 19th and Early 20th Century American Movements, Tudor Revival, Arts & Crafts
- NRHP reference No.: 90000369
- Added to NRHP: March 9, 1990

The Josef Jacobberger House at 1502 SW Upper Hall Street in Portland, Oregon was designed and built during 1906–07. It was listed on the National Register of Historic Places in 1990. It was a work of architect Joseph Jacobberger to serve as his own residence. Stained glass windows flanking its front door and elsewhere in the house are believed to be works by the firm of David L. Povey.

== See also ==
- Joseph Jacobberger Country House
