= Marylhurst, Oregon =

Neighborhood in Lake Oswego, Oregon

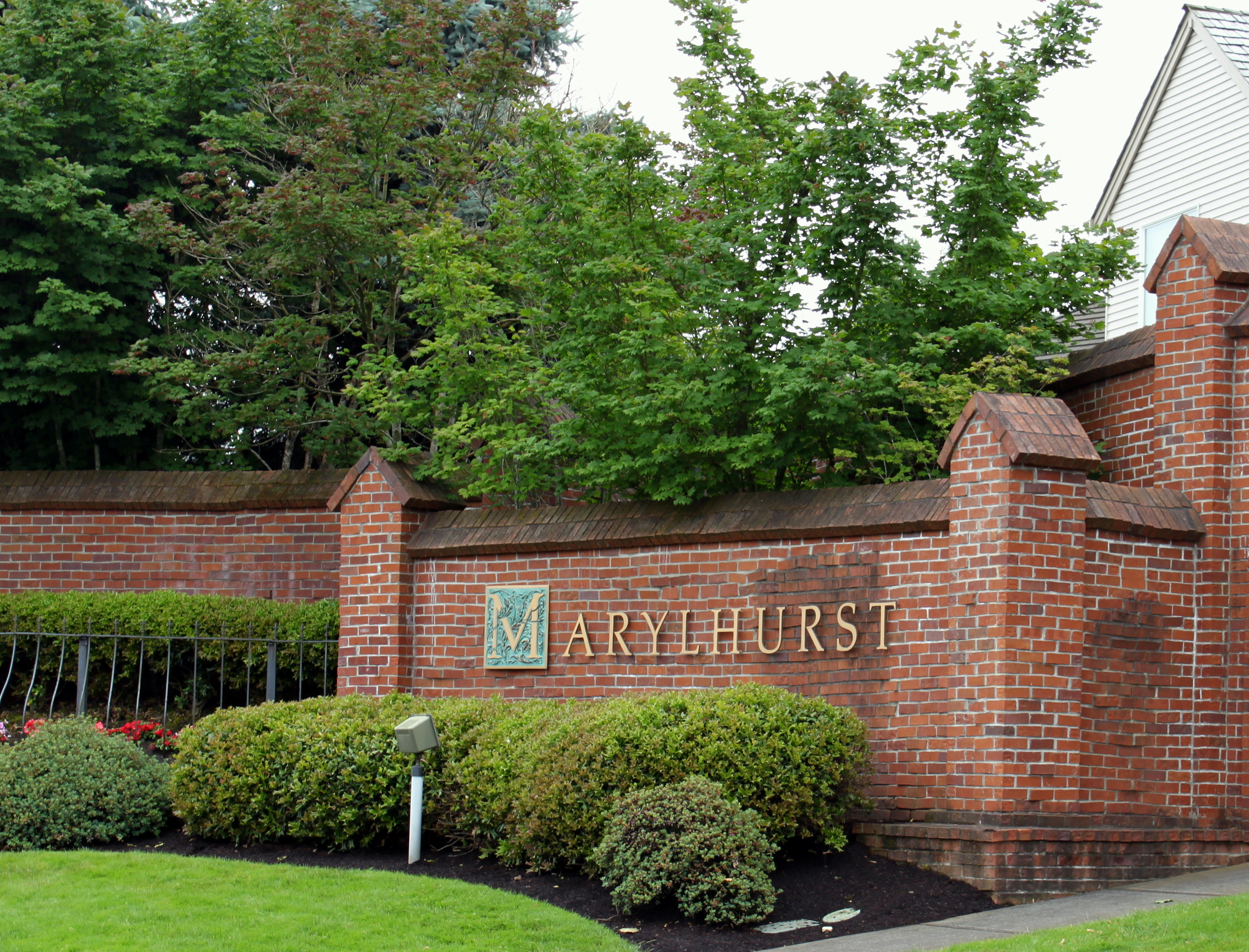
- Sign at entrance to community

- Location within the state of Oregon Marylhurst, Oregon (the United States)
- Coordinates: 45°24′04″N 122°39′04″W
- Country: United States
- State: Oregon
- County: Clackamas
- Elevation: 151 ft (46 m)
- Time zone: UTC-8 (Pacific (PST))
  - Summer (DST): UTC-7 (PDT)
- GNIS feature ID: 1158626

Marylhurst, Oregon is the location of a U.S. Post Office, ZIP Code 97036, in southern Lake Oswego, Oregon on the campus of Marylhurst University (closed in 2018).

Marylhurst, more commonly accepted, is the name of a neighborhood within the city of Lake Oswego, OR and is also the name of a residential development across from the campus, which officially is part of the Glenmorrie neighborhood of Lake Oswego, Oregon. It is located approximately eight miles south of Portland on Oregon Route 43 near the Willamette River.
