= George E. Heathman =

American businessman (1881–1930)

- Born: George E. Heathman Jr. August 1881; Iowa
- Died: July 31, 1930 (aged 48); Portland, Oregon
- Occupation(s): General contractor Hotel owner
- Years active: 1921 – 1930
- Known for: Park Heathman Hotel; Heathman Hotel

George E. Heathman (August 1881 – July 31, 1930) was a general contractor and hotel executive responsible for the construction of several buildings in Portland, Oregon, notably the Roosevelt Hotel, the Park Heathman Hotel, and the New Heathman Hotel.

== Early life ==
Little is known of Heathman's childhood and education. He was born in 1881 in Iowa to George and Laura Heathman. The family moved to Washington state prior to the census of 1900.

== Career ==
Heathman arrived in Portland about 1921 and became a general building contractor. He constructed the Red Men Hall, a lodge operated by the Improved Order of Red Men, at SE 9th and Hawthorne in 1922. The building was designed by architects Claussen and Claussen, a firm Heathman would employ on other projects. Heathman's other early buildings include the L.E. Fairchild Building at SE 11th and Hawthorne, the M. Pallay Building, occupied by S. & S. Auto Wrecking, at SE Lownsdale (15th Avenue) and Alder, and the Badley-Smith Auto Company building at SE 9th and Madison.

In 1924 Heathman completed construction of the Roosevelt Hotel at SW Park and Salmon. He formed a partnership with Virgil Crum and Earl Smith, the Roosevelt Hotel Company, and became a hotel executive. Heathman formed the Heathman-Crum Hotel Company and built two more hotels. In 1926 he opened the Heathman Hotel at SW Park and Salmon. The Heathman Hotel was renamed the Park Heathman after the New Heathman Hotel opened at SW Broadway and Salmon in 1927.

== Death ==
Heathman suffered a stroke in 1930 and died at the age of 49.

== Legacy ==
Three of Heathman's buildings, the Roosevelt Hotel, the Park Heathman Hotel (Heathman Hotel), and the New Heathman Hotel, are listed on the National Register of Historic Places.
