= Park Heathman Hotel =

Historic building in Portland, Oregon, U.S.

- Heathman Hotel
- U.S. National Register of Historic Places
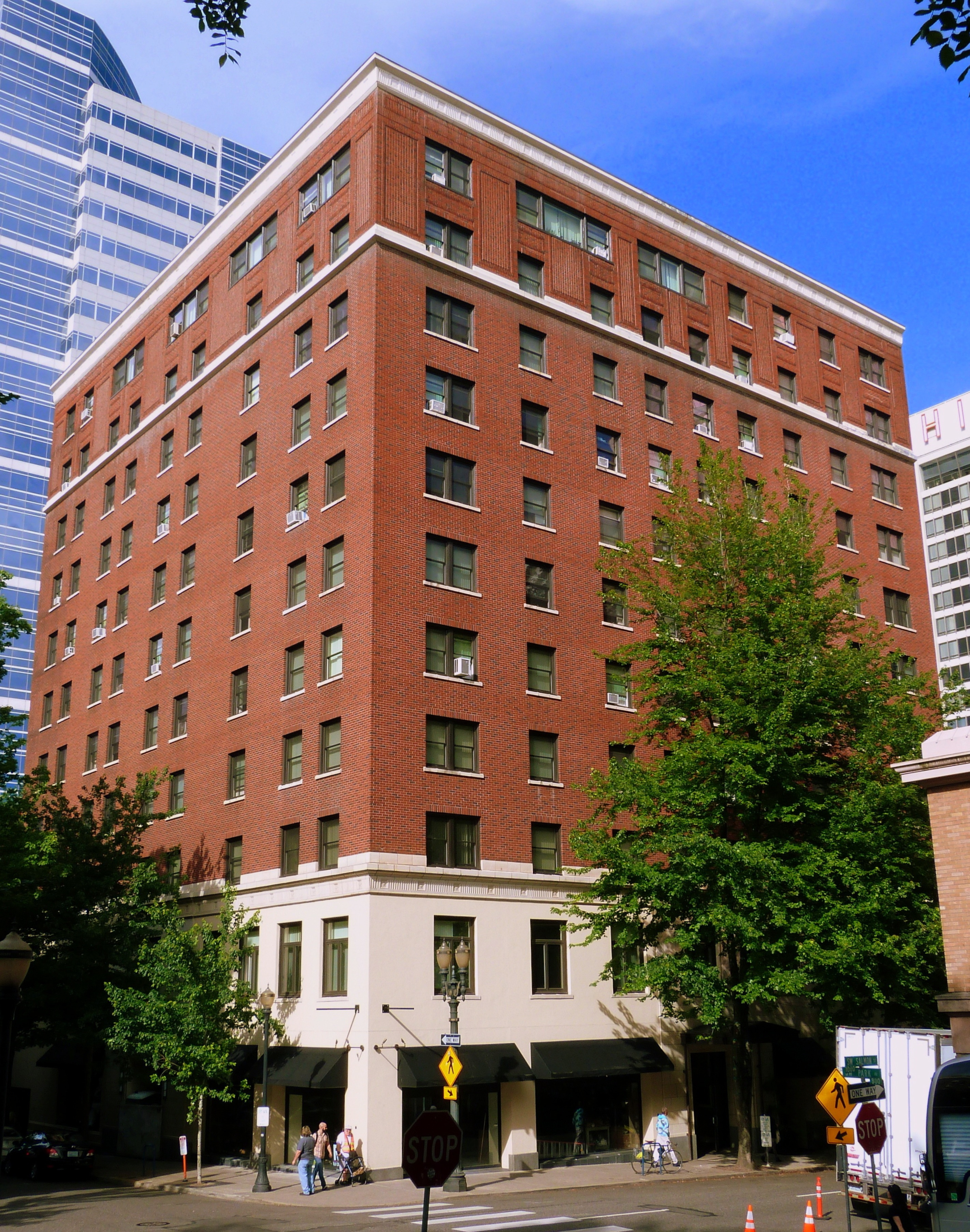
- The Park Heathman Hotel, also known as the Heathman Hotel and the Park Haviland Hotel, currently the Park Tower Apartments

- Location within Portland, Oregon
- Location: 723 SW Salmon Street, Portland, Oregon
- Coordinates: 45°31′03″N 122°40′53″W
- Area: 100ft by 100ft
- Built: 1926
- Built by: George E. Heathman
- Architect: Claussen and Claussen
- Architectural style: Early 20th Century Commercial
- NRHP reference No.: 14000879
- Added to NRHP: August 25, 2014

The Park Heathman Hotel, originally known as the Heathman Hotel, is a residential building in Portland, Oregon, that serves low-income seniors and disabled persons. Owned by Harsch Investment Properties, the building was renamed Park Tower Apartments in the 1980s. It was added to the National Register of Historic Places in 2014.

== History ==
=== Heathman era ===
The Park Heathman Hotel was constructed by George E. Heathman in 1926 at the northeast corner of SW Park Avenue and Salmon Street, a year before he built the New Heathman Hotel one block away at the southwest corner of SW Broadway and Salmon Street. It was called the Heathman Hotel until construction of the New Heathman Hotel.

After voters approved construction of both the Burnside Bridge and the Ross Island Bridge, investors of the 1920s sought an expansion of Portland's commercial district south of Morrison Street in Downtown Portland. The downtown expansion effort coincided with a building frenzy all over town. The area of the South Park Blocks was part of the general direction of new construction, and new buildings included the Park Heathman Hotel, the Roosevelt Hotel (1924), the Congress Hotel expansion (1924, demolished in 1980), the Medical Arts Building (1925), the New Heathman Hotel (1927), the Portland Theater (1928), and the Pacific Building (1928). Over 184 new buildings were constructed in Portland in the 1920s, and 38 were hotels. Heathman, a general contractor responsible for construction of the 112-room Roosevelt Hotel at the southwest corner of Park Avenue (9th Avenue) and Salmon Street in 1924, began construction of the 302-room Heathman Hotel in 1925 with plans provided by architects Claussen and Claussen. The original cost estimate for the Park Heathman Hotel was $700,000. Fully furnished, the hotel was estimated to cost more than $1 million.

Radio station KOIN moved into the basement two weeks after the hotel opened, but the station moved to the New Heathman Hotel in 1927.

Soon after constructing the hotel, Heathman sold the property to E. V. Hauser Sr., but he leased the hotel from Hauser and continued to operate it indirectly until his death in 1930. After that, members of the Heathman family operated the hotel.

Portland hotel construction stopped in the late-1920s after it was learned that average occupancy was less than 60 percent.

=== John Haviland ownership ===
After the death of son Harry Heathman in 1960, Heathman family interest in the hotel was sold to John Haviland. The name was changed from Park Heathman to Park Haviland in 1962. Haviland, after purchasing the Paramount Theater, constructed a sky bridge connecting the Park Haviland Hotel, the Paramount, and the New Heathman Hotel. For a time in the 1970s, he operated both hotels as the Paramount Heathman Hotel, but the older building was marketed more as a home for transients, elderly, and disabled persons, and it retained the name Park Haviland. Building inspectors closed the hotel in 1980 for building and fire code violations.

=== Schnitzer family ownership ===
The Schnitzer family purchased the hotel in 1980, and Jordan Schnitzer began a major renovation in 1982 to address code violations and to prepare the building for Section 8 subsidized housing. The name was changed to Park Tower Apartments, and the building reopened in December 1982.

== Historical significance ==
The hotel was one of more than 184 buildings built as part of a construction boom in the 1920s. When built, it was the largest and most elegant hotel in Portland. The building boom emphasized vertical growth and an increase in commercial rather than residential development. By the end of the boom, the downtown area had shifted to the west and was characterized by taller buildings with ground level storefronts.

Many of the 1915 to 1931 buildings in the area have been demolished; by 2014, just ten of the 38 hotel buildings constructed during that era remained. Only the nearby New Heathman continued to operate as a hotel; most of the remaining had been repurposed, like the Park Heathman, as affordable housing.

The building was listed on the National Register of Historic Places as the Heathman Hotel in 2014.

== See also ==
- National Register of Historic Places listings in Southwest Portland, Oregon
- The Picnic House
