= Portland Van and Storage Building =

Historic building in Portland, Oregon, U.S.

- U.S. National Register of Historic Places
- Portland Historic Landmark
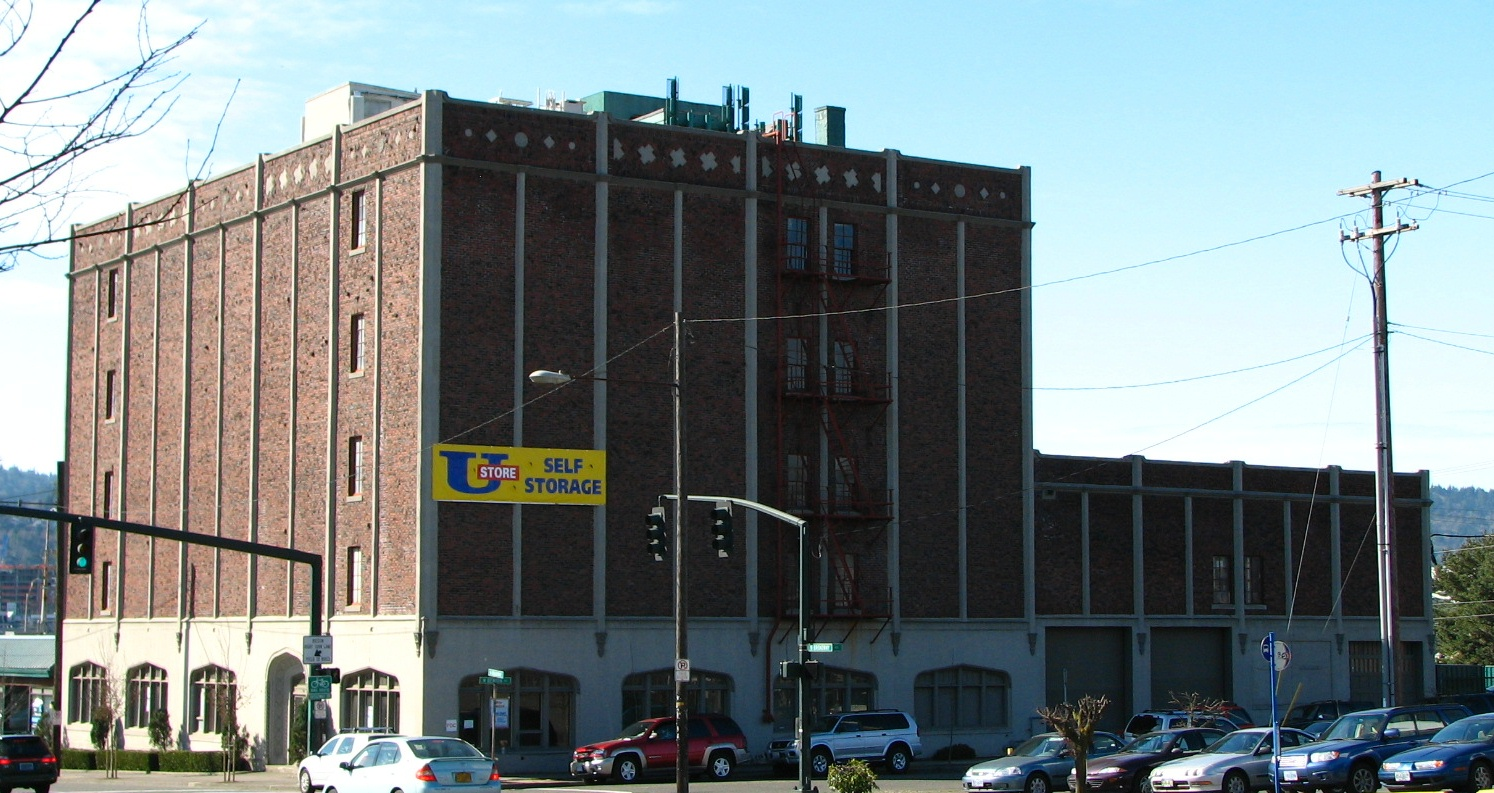
- Portland Van and Storage Building in 2008

- Location within Portland, Oregon Location within Oregon Location within the United States
- Location: 407 N Broadway; Portland, Oregon
- Coordinates: 45°32′02″N 122°40′15″W
- Built: 1926
- Architect: Claussen and Claussen
- Architectural style: Chicago
- NRHP reference No.: 96000125
- Added to NRHP: February 22, 1996

The Portland Van and Storage Building is a building located in north Portland, Oregon listed on the National Register of Historic Places.

The Portland fire marshal halted construction in 1925 when it was discovered that window space in the building was not equal to one-twenty-fifth of floor space, a violation of the building code. The city council granted a special permit allowing construction to be completed, giving the building its unique appearance.

== See also ==
- National Register of Historic Places listings in North Portland, Oregon
