= Bar Sprezzatura =

Restaurant information
- Website: barsprezzatura.com

Bar Sprezzatura is a bar and restaurant in the Financial District of San Francisco, California, United States. It opened in November 2022. The bar has also operated at the Kimpton Hotel Theta in Times Square, Midtown Manhattan. In August 2026, the business announced plans to open another location in Portland, Oregon's Heathman Hotel.

== Description ==
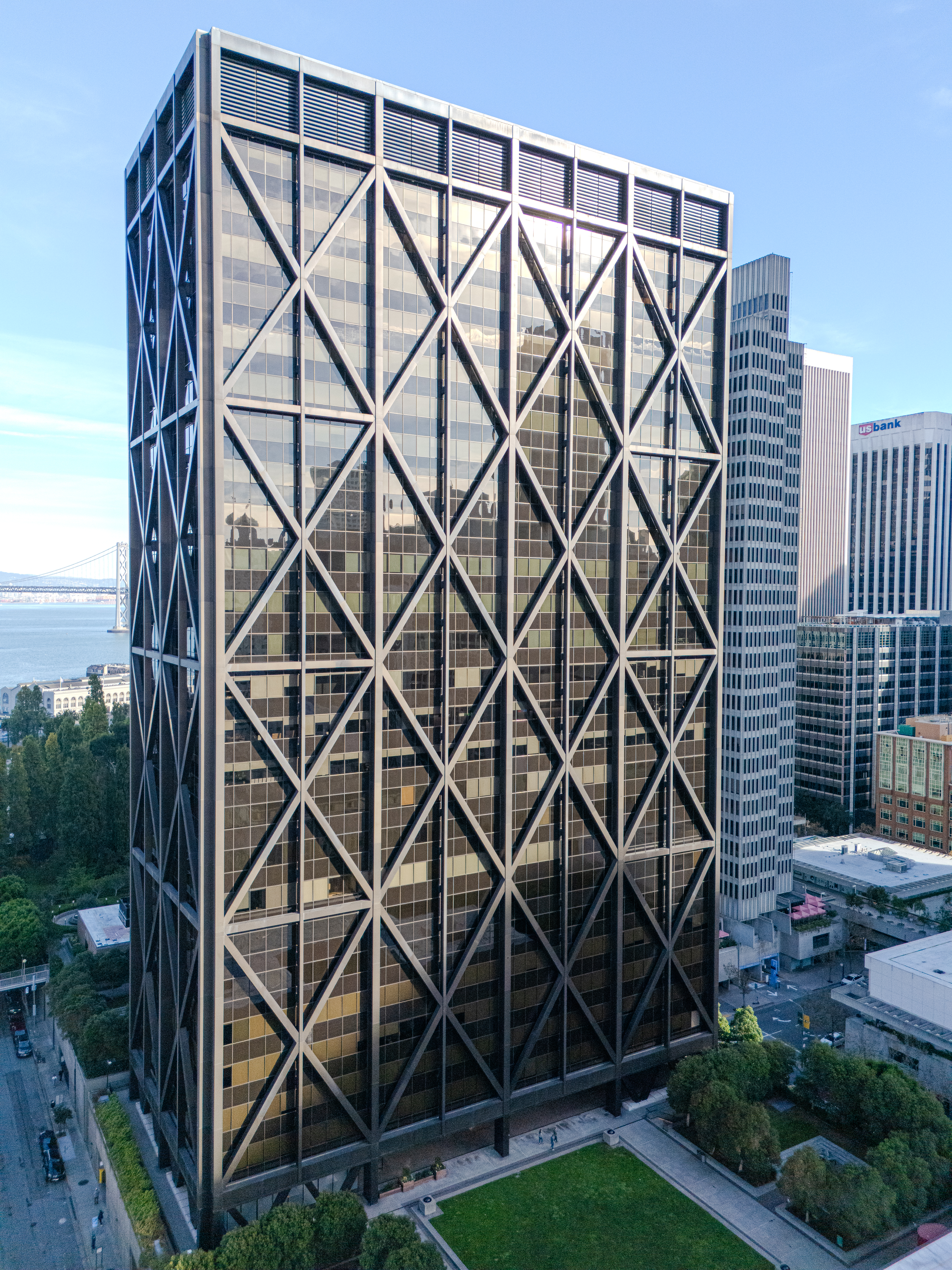
The bar operates in One Maritime Plaza (exterior pictured in 2025), in San Francisco's Financial District.

Bar Sprezzatura operates at One Maritime Plaza in San Francisco's Financial District. The interior has been described as "elegant" and "stylish", with tall ceilings, velvet couches, wood panelling, and large standing lamps. The dining room has blue and goldenrod tones. Flora Tsapovsky of Eater SF has described the bar as a "glimmering testament to both modernity and luxury", writing: "Stepping into the bar might feel like being transported to the set of White Lotus". David Landis of the San Francisco Bay Times called the bar "buzzy" and "ultra-chic".

The New York location is a rooftop restaurant.

=== Menu ===
The bar has a rotating "Venetian bacari-inspired" menu, according to Axios Portland, and Italian bar snacks. The menu has included cichetti, crudo, pastas, and salads. The bar has also served arancini, caviar, deviled eggs, and pizza. Drink options include an espresso martini, negronis, Italian wines, and beers. The Negroni Caffe has Tuaca, Fernet, espresso liqueur, and coffee liqueur. One martini has was flavored with tomato and balsamic vinegar. Another $40 martini has truffle-infused vodka.

== History ==
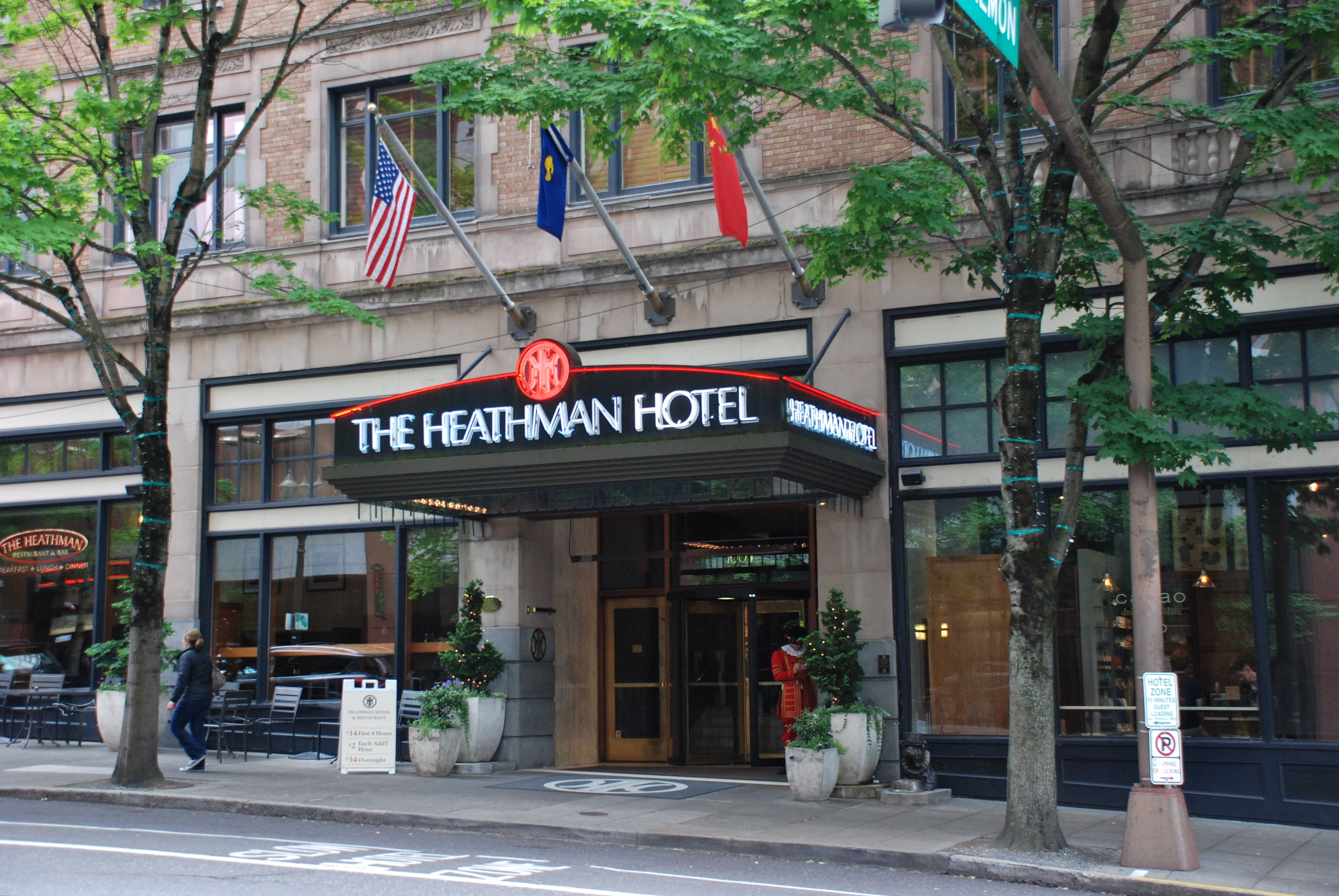
The Portland, Oregon location will operate in the Heathman Hotel (exterior pictured in 2014).

The San Francisco location opened in November 2022 under executive chef Joseph Offner and lead mixologist/partner Carlo Splendorini. The New York location opened in September 2024.

In New York, Alex Floethe has been the general manager and Trevor Kalafus has been the executive chef. Phil Collins has been the director of beverage.

In August 2026, the business announced plans to open another location in Portland, Oregon's Heathman Hotel. The bar opened in October 2026.

== Reception ==
Esquire included the business in a 2023 list of the nation's best bars.

== See also ==
- List of restaurant chains in the United States
