= The Picnic House =

Restaurant in Portland, Oregon, U.S.

- Interactive map of The Picnic House

Restaurant information
- Established: 2012
- Owners: Aaron Grimmer; Jessica Grimmer
- Chef: Casey Gipson
- Food type: American
- Location: 723 Southwest Salmon Street, Portland, Multnomah, Oregon, 97205, United States
- Coordinates: 45.5176°N 122.6813°W
- Website: picnichousepdx.com

The Picnic House is a restaurant in Portland, Oregon's Park Heathman Hotel, in the United States. Aaron and Jessica Grimmer opened the restaurant in 2012.

== Description ==
The Picnic House is a restaurant in Portland, Oregon. The business initially operated in downtown Portland's Park Heathman Hotel, a building originally known as the Heathman Hotel.

Thrillist describes The Picnic House as a "prohibition-styled eating space" with a long dining table made from 700 year-old reclaimed fir wood and a menu of "classic, traditional American-style eats". In her guide book Moon Portland (2014), Hollyanna McCollom described the restaurant as an American and French-style bistro with a simple menu and the option to rent a picnic basket with food and wine to consume at the nearby South Park Blocks. She described the interior, which features dark wood and black-and-white tiles, as "bright and open" and "cute" and "rustic".

In 2015, Eater Portland's Mattie John Bamman said the restaurant offers "fancier, international fare". The website's Erin DeJesus has described The Picnic House as a "charming fast-casual spot" with "elevated picnic fare" including pastas, salads, sandwiches, and soups. One soup has roasted cauliflower with Parmesan, and salad options include ricotta and vegetables. The menu also has roasted pork loin and small plates with pickled shrimp and bavette skewers, as well as charcuterie and desserts.

== History ==
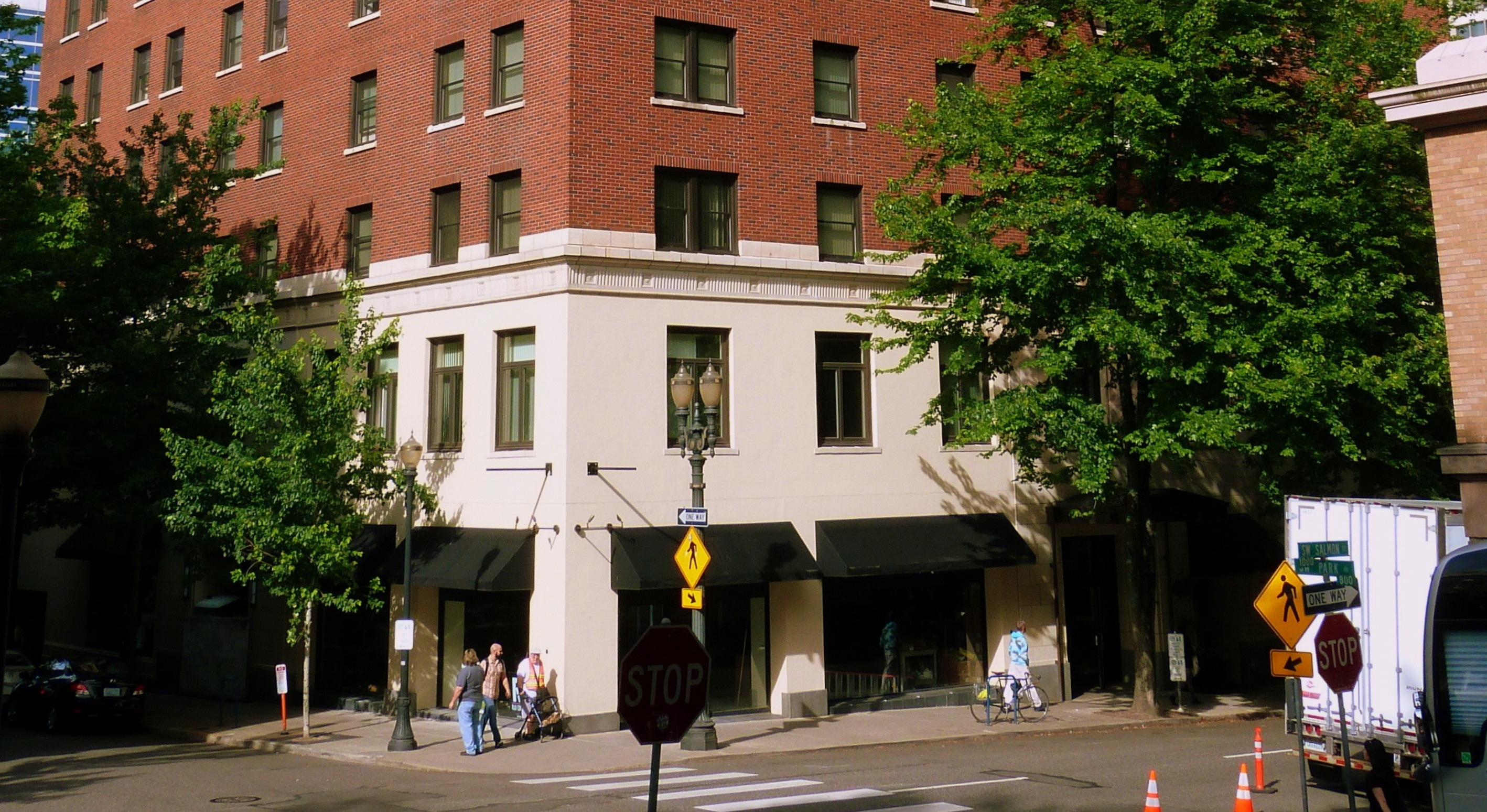
Exterior of the Park Heathman Hotel, which housed the restaurant, in 2014

Aaron and Jessica Grimmer opened The Picnic House in mid 2012. Casey Gipson served as chef, as of 2016.

The Picnic House has hosted a variety of special events and performances. In 2016, the restaurant hosted a "one-man dinner-theater show" in which Phillip J. Berns portrayed Ebenezer Scrooge and other characters in an adaptation of Charles Dickens' 1843 novella A Christmas Carol. Berns performed on a staircase and was accompanied by a pianist. Shannon Gormley and Jack Russell described the "set" as a "dining room reminiscent of the first-class quarters aboard the Titanic". In 2019, The Picnic House and neighboring Barlow Artisanal Bar (also owned by the Grimmers) hosted a fifth annual New Year's Eve celebration. The carnival-themed party included fortunetellers, games, live music and circus performances, and raffles, as well as a costume contest, an ice luge, and a glass of champagne for toasting the New Year.

In November 2018, Picnic PDX opened in northwest Portland as a "whimsical sister restaurant" to The Picnic House and Barlow.

In April 2024, the Grimmers announced plans to operate The Picnic House via delivery only, using the kitchen of High Noon, another restaurant launched by the couple.
