= Heathman Hotel =

Hotel and historic building in Portland, Oregon, U.S.

- New Heathman Hotel
- U.S. National Register of Historic Places
- Portland Historic Landmark
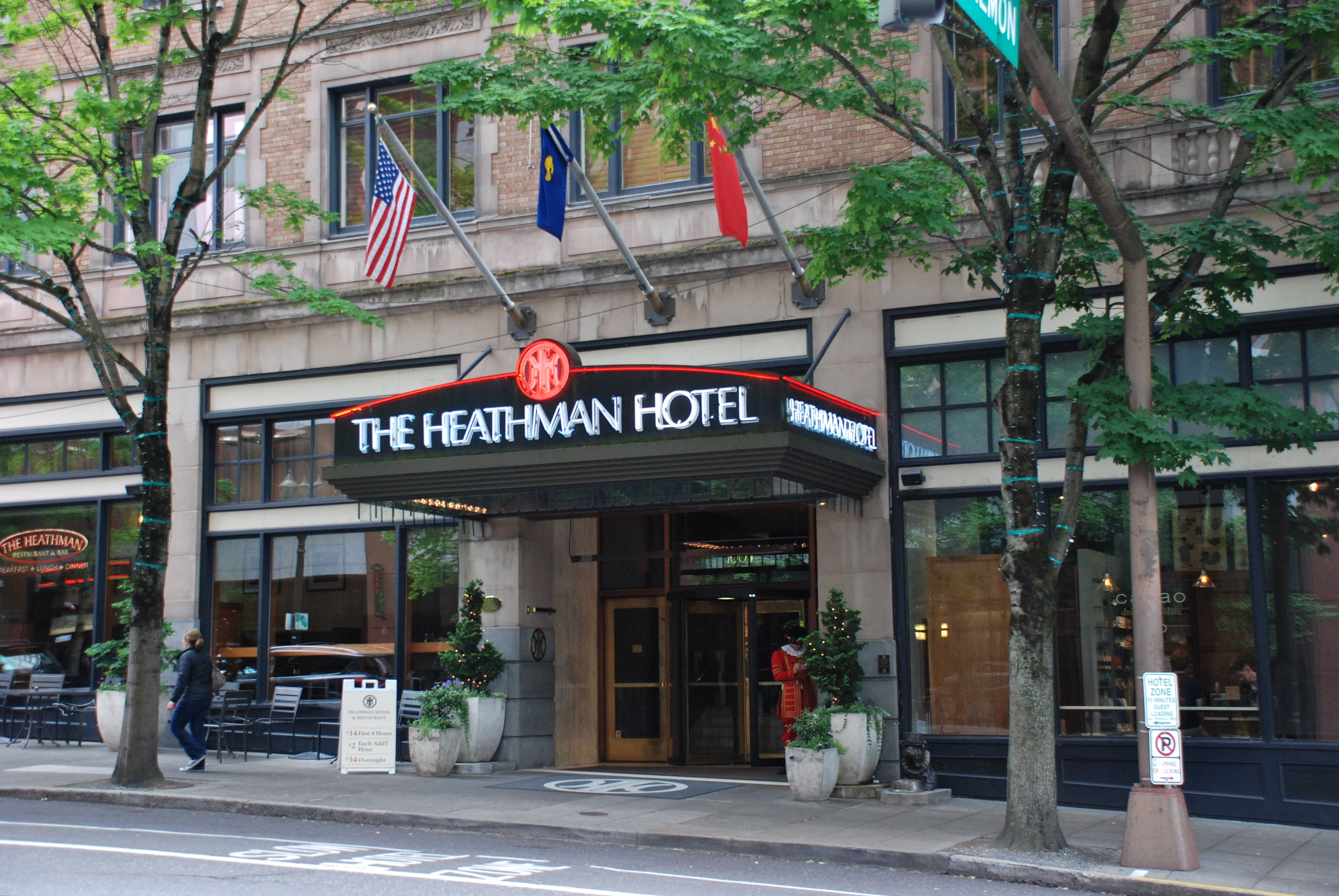
- The hotel's entrance on Broadway at Salmon Street; one of the hotel's costumed greeters is visible (2014)

- Location within Portland, Oregon
- Location: 712 SW Salmon Street; Portland, Oregon
- Coordinates: 45°31′02″N 122°40′52″W
- Built: 1927
- Architect: DeYoung & Roald
- Architectural style: Jacobean Revival
- NRHP reference No.: 84003087
- Added to NRHP: February 16, 1984

The Heathman Hotel, in Portland, Oregon, United States, was originally built as the New Heathman Hotel and opened in 1927. It is among the last remaining historical Portland hotels such as the Benson Hotel (opened 1912), Imperial Hotel (built 1894), and Governor Hotel (built in 1909 as the Seward Hotel and now the Sentinel Hotel). It was listed on the National Register of Historic Places in 1984, as the New Heathman Hotel.

== History ==
=== Construction, heyday, and decline ===
The original Heathman Hotel in Portland OR, one block away from the current structure, was built at the intersection of Park and Salmon streets in 1926 by George Heathman, at a cost of $1 million. Wealthy lumber barons and railroad magnates, politicians, and upper-class investors of the day wanted a hotel that would fit their social station and demand for comfort and excellence. It stood 11 stories tall and offered 300 rooms.

Because of the success of the first hotel, Heathman immediately started work on a sister hotel a block away. The New Heathman Hotel was completed in 1927. It was a 10-story concrete structure faced with brick. The decorative details were designed in the Jacobean Revival style by the Portland architectural firm of DeYoung and Roald. The second story and upper-floor windows were trimmed in stone, and the lobby's dark-hued paneling extended to the mezzanine, where light flooded through tall, arched windows. Acanthus leaves decorated the mezzanine's plaster columns and ceiling trim. The hotel's entrance was on the Salmon Street side (where it remained until 1984).

The building of the New Heathman was Portland's largest construction project to that date, employing 1,200 workers, all of whom were invited to celebrate at the pre-opening party. A formal opening occurred on December 17, 1927, marking the end of seven months of work.

When the New Heathman was ready, Governor I. L. Patterson and Mayor George Luis Baker made dedication speeches. Radio station KOIN featured live band and orchestral pieces. Portland city commissioners joined with the business community to pay tribute. The Oregon Journal described the Heathman as "Portland's newest and most modern hotel" and wrote, "Its planning, construction and general appointments are as modern as human ingenuity and talent could possibly make it", and that it was located on "Broadway … ablaze with theatre marquees, restaurants and shops."

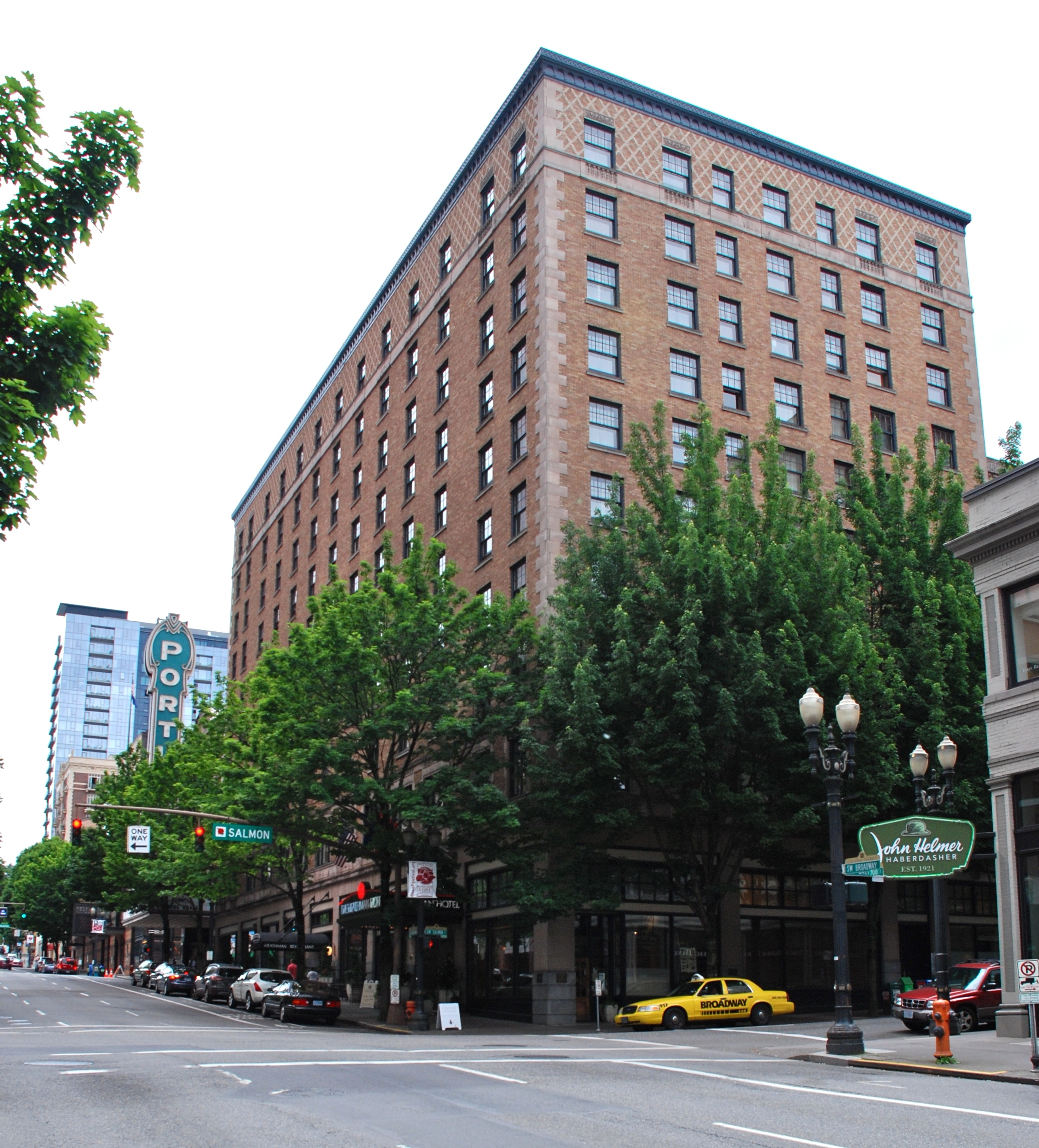
The hotel in 2014, viewed looking south on Broadway

In 1927, Broadway was called Portland's "Great White Way," and was the focal point of downtown's entertainment center. Large, boldly colored marquee lights surrounded the hotel. On the eve of construction, Heathman announced plans to put in a ground floor coffee shop that was designed to be the largest coffee shop in the Pacific Northwest of the United States.

KOIN moved from the old Heathman to the new Heathman on December 17, 1927. On September 22, 1932, KOIN acquired a sister station, KALE. KALE moved into the KOIN studio complex in 1933. With an additional station, more studio space was needed. Between 1933 and 1939, the mezzanine of the New Heathman was modified several times to accommodate the stations. The biggest change was the addition of the north–south wall and several dividing partitions to create offices along the east side of the building. Studio A and Studio B at the south end were also altered. By 1940 the major structural changes were finished. The studios were then described as "the finest broadcast facility in the country." In 1944, KALE moved out of the New Heathman when KOIN was sold. When KOIN joined the television era in 1953, it required development of larger quarters still and finally left its radio studios at the New Heathman in 1955 to join its TV sister station.

The New Heathman's coffee shop eventually closed as business diminished. The space was temporarily used as a political campaign headquarters, then sat empty until the hotel's renovation in 1983. The area that is now the hotel's entrance once housed a drug store and gift shop. The drug store gained fame as Portland's first 24-hour pharmacy.

George Heathman died at age 49, less than three years after the New Heathman was completed. His wife, Katherine, and their two children remained active in the hotel industry and retained an interest in operations of the New Heathman until the early 1960s. Harry, George's son, managed the hotel until shortly before his death in 1962.

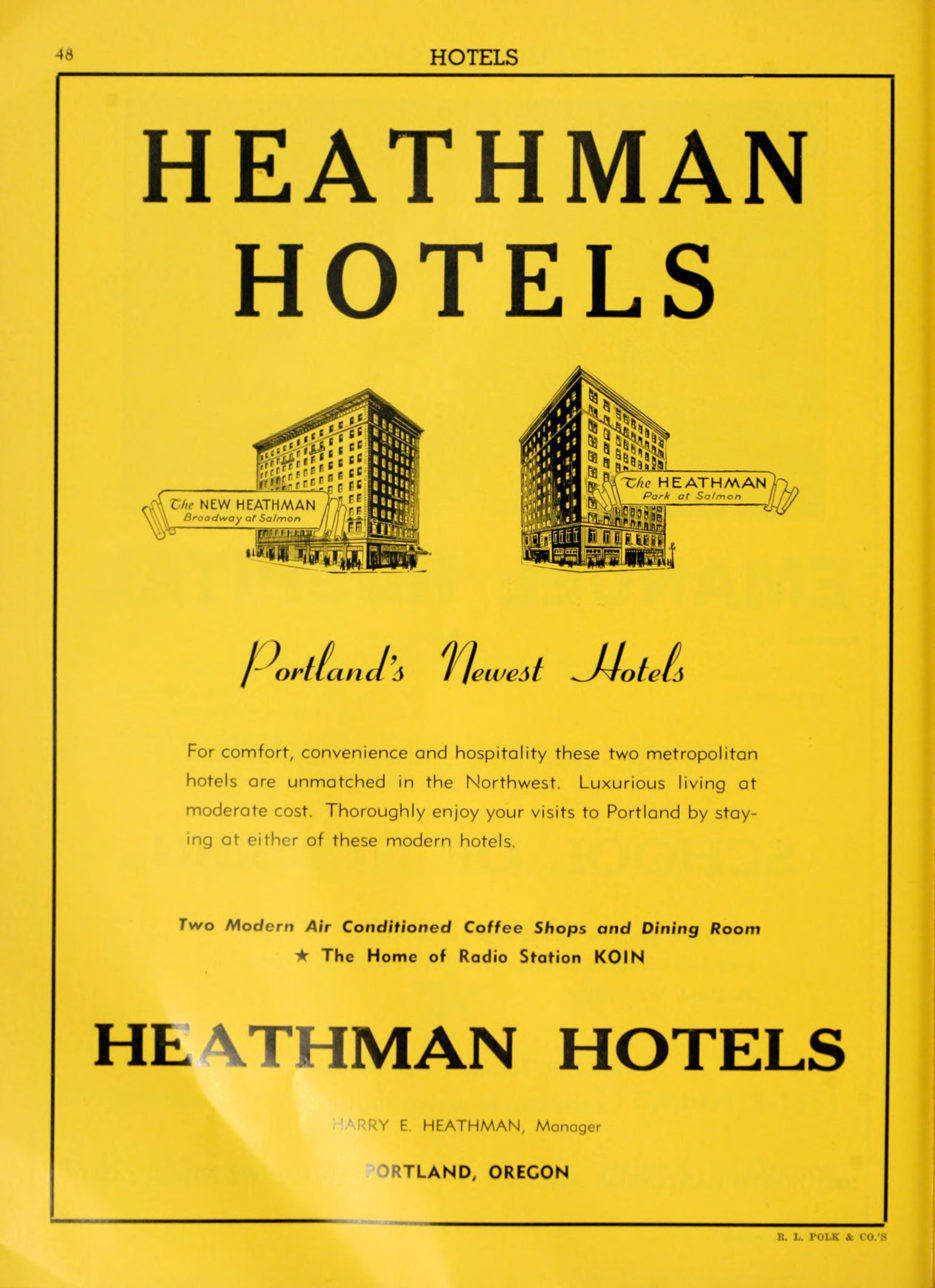
A 1956 print advertisement for the Heathman hotels

In the 1950s, much of the business and entertainment in Portland's downtown left for the suburbs. By the late 1960s, Broadway had lost most of these businesses. In the next decade, new city leaders recognized the changes and sought to convince major retail stores to keep their operations in the heart of downtown, and to even build new locations.

As the city redeveloped the downtown area, it attempted to reintroduce music and theater on Broadway. A performing arts center was developed in the old Paramount Theatre (now called The Arlene Schnitzer Concert Hall) located next door to the New Heathman. The site's development and architectural design plans were drawn with the help of the city, private investors, concerned citizens, and artists.

The Portland Center for Performing Arts Area Development Plan noted in 1982 that the location and development of the New Heathman made its condition crucial to the success of the adjacent Paramount Concert Hall. The Heathman Hotel was placed on the National Register of Historic Places (NRHP) in February 1984, under its old name, the New Heathman Hotel. At the time the building was nominated for the NRHP, it was noted that "interior fixtures, facilities and furnishings are presently ill maintained, inadequate and outdated." The nomination also said that in 1983, "much of the interior spaces in the New Heathman Hotel are unoccupied."

=== The Second Renovation ===
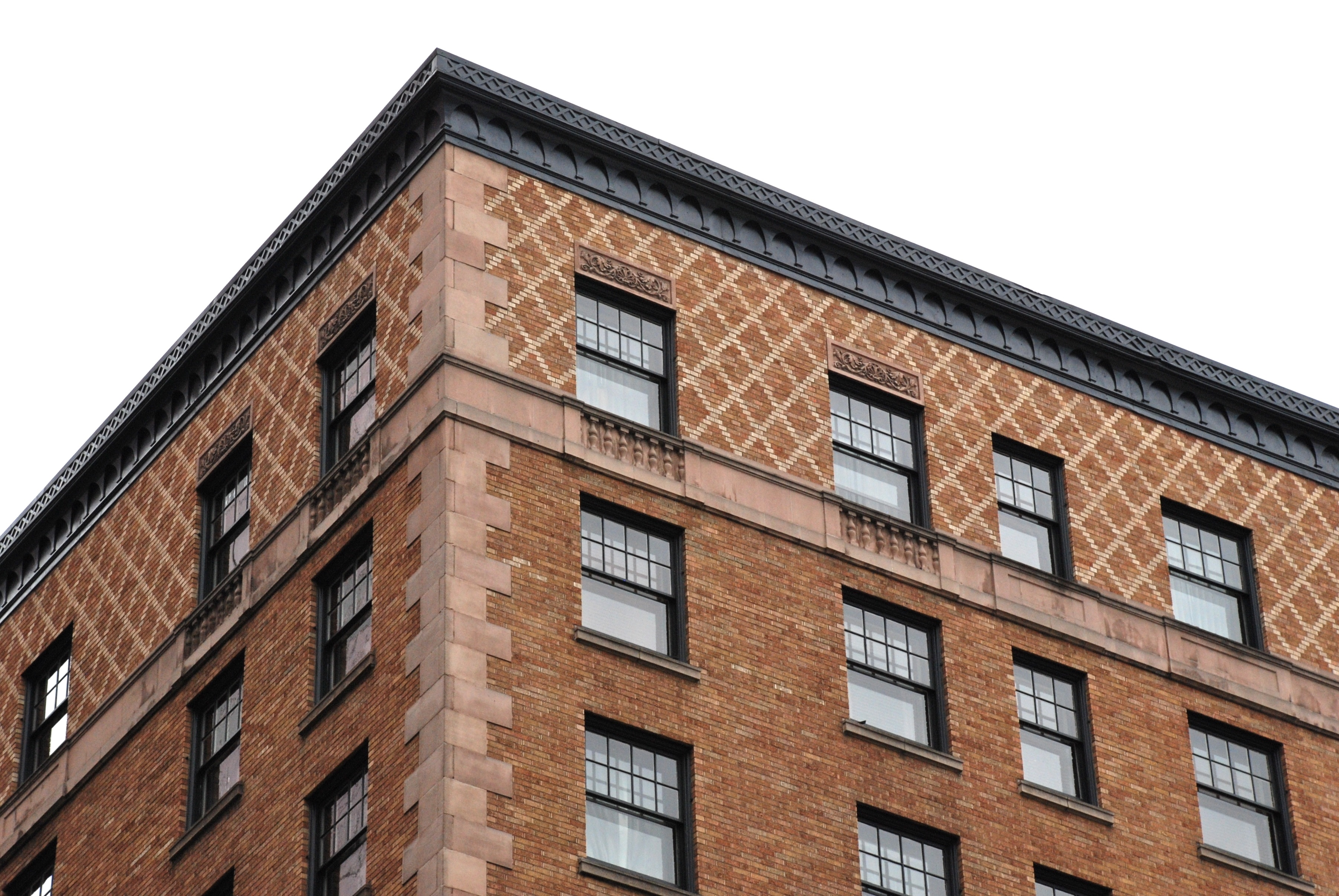
Detail view of upper floors

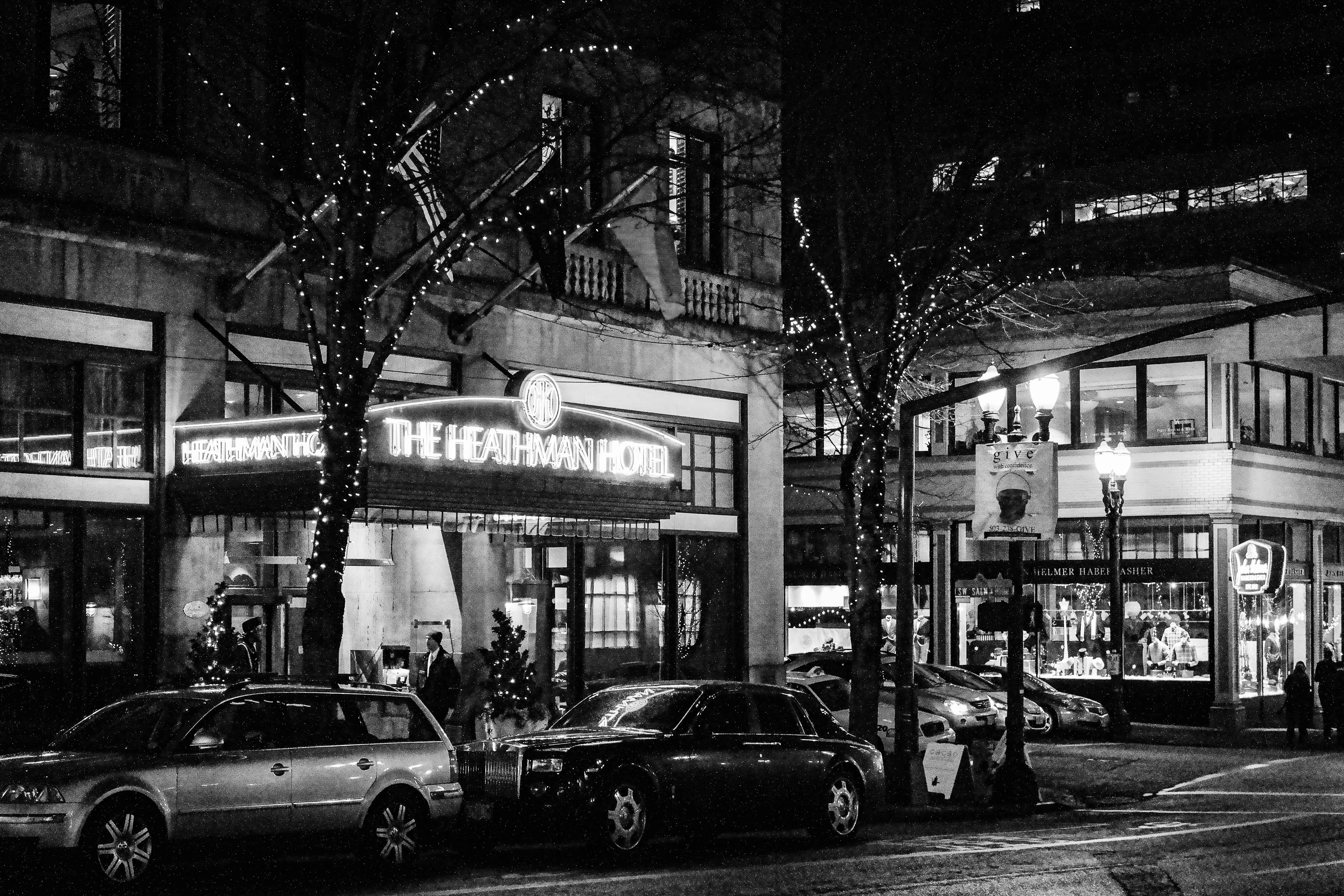
The hotel's exterior at night, 2013

The New Heathman's importance to the neighborhood appealed to developers, so by autumn of 1984 a two-year and $16 million renovation of the building was completed, with the "New" prefix removed from the name, as the original hotel had long since been renamed. The Heathman's public spaces were remodeled in new natural materials like marble and teak brought in by Portland architect Carter Case and interior designer Andrew Delfino. Then-owner Mark Stevenson had the original exterior and eucalyptus-paneled Tea Court restored. Above the Tea Court, a 100-year-old crystal chandelier that was once used in the U.S. Embassy in Czechoslovakia was hung and 18th-century paintings by French landscape artist Claude Lorrain were installed and remains to this day. The renovated guest rooms were furnished in 18th–20th-century styles of Biedermeier, Ming, Empire, and Regency. As part of this remodeling, the hotel's main entrance was relocated from Salmon Street to Broadway, in support of new city design guidelines calling for major building entrances to be located on major streets.

The Stevenson family sold the hotel and the name to the Rim Corporation of Modesto, California, in 2000.

Local restaurant chain McCormick & Schmick's took over management of the Heathman's restaurant; Rim announced it would adopt the "Heathman" name for its line of upscale, boutique hotels. The purchase price was reported as being "in the neighborhood" of $25 million.

In October 2007, a new Heathman Hotel opened in Kirkland, Washington, with 91 rooms.

LaSalle Hotel Properties bought the Heathman in December 2014 for $64.3 million.

Pebblebrook Hotel Trust purchased the Heathman Hotel November 30, 2018 and brought Provenance Hotels to manage it. Soon thereafter, the hotel underwent a complete hotel renovation aspiring to introduce a semi-formal, luxury, travel experience authentic to Portland, OR. The total cost of renovation was approximately $20 million.

In February 2023, The Heathman was purchased by Aparium Hotel Group.

== Hotel amenities ==
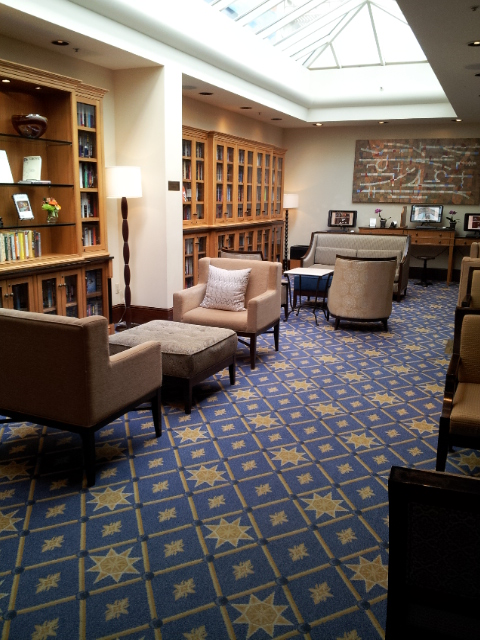
The hotel's library (2013)

Under new ownership, the restaurant and many amenities (i.e. daily housekeeping) have returned in June 2023. The entrance also features a bronze sculpture of Zelda, an English bulldog from Portland, who is also dressed in a Beefeater costume. The sculpture, which includes a dog bowl filled with fresh water, was donated by Banfield Pet Hospital in 2010, and depicts the star of the "Zelda Wisdom" line of greeting cards.

Travel + Leisure placed the Heathman on its 500 Best Hotels in the World list in 2005, 2006, 2007, 2009, and 2015. In 2011, Food & Wine listed the Heathman as one of the 21 most haunted restaurants and hotels in America.

Support of the arts

The Heathman acquired several original artworks at the time of the 1980s remodel and launched a campaign of support for the visual arts. The hotel's collection has included 250 original paintings, photographs, and works on paper, with a focus on American artists, and particularly artists local to the Northwestern United States. Prints from Andy Warhol's Endangered Species lithograph series are found on most floors, and one room specifically pays tribute to Warhol in its interior design.

Visual art exhibits that change seasonally can be viewed on the mezzanine. These exhibits are curated by Portland's Elizabeth Leach Gallery. The Heathman also has a library on the mezzanine level containing a large collection of books signed by authors who have been guests at the hotel.

=== Restaurant ===
The Heathman Restaurant & Bar was run by Houston, Texas-based Landry's, Inc. It was known for French-influenced Pacific Northwest cuisine, and was considered one of Portland's top restaurants, earning four stars from the Forbes Travel Guide in 2014. In 2003, while the restaurant was under McCormick & Schmick's management, Anthony Bourdain reported in The New York Times on a special all-offal menu at the Heathman created in his honor.

In 2016 the restaurant was reopened as Headwaters at the Heathman, or simply Headwaters, after a 6-month renovation. Run by chef Vitaly Paley, Headwaters specializes in seafood and Pacific Northwest cuisine.

In late March 2020, The Heathman Hotel, along with many other Portland hotels decided to pause operations in order to help stop the spread of COVID 19. As a result, Paley Hospitality moved to terminate operations of most Portland restaurant outlets, including Headwaters at the Heathman Hotel. The closure was extended into October 2020 as management reorganized and prepared to introduce health, sanitation and safety requirements expected by travelers. Following post covid recovery, Headwaters at the Heathman has since reopened to the public.

== Reception ==
The hotel won in the Best Place to Spot Celebrities category of Willamette Week's annual 'Best of Portland' readers' poll in 2005. It won in the Best Hotel category in 2007. It placed second and was a finalist in the same category in 2025 and 2026, respectively.

== See also ==
- Bar Sprezzatura
