= Brown Apartments (Portland, Oregon) =

Historic building in Portland, Oregon, U.S.

- U.S. National Register of Historic Places
- Portland Historic Landmark
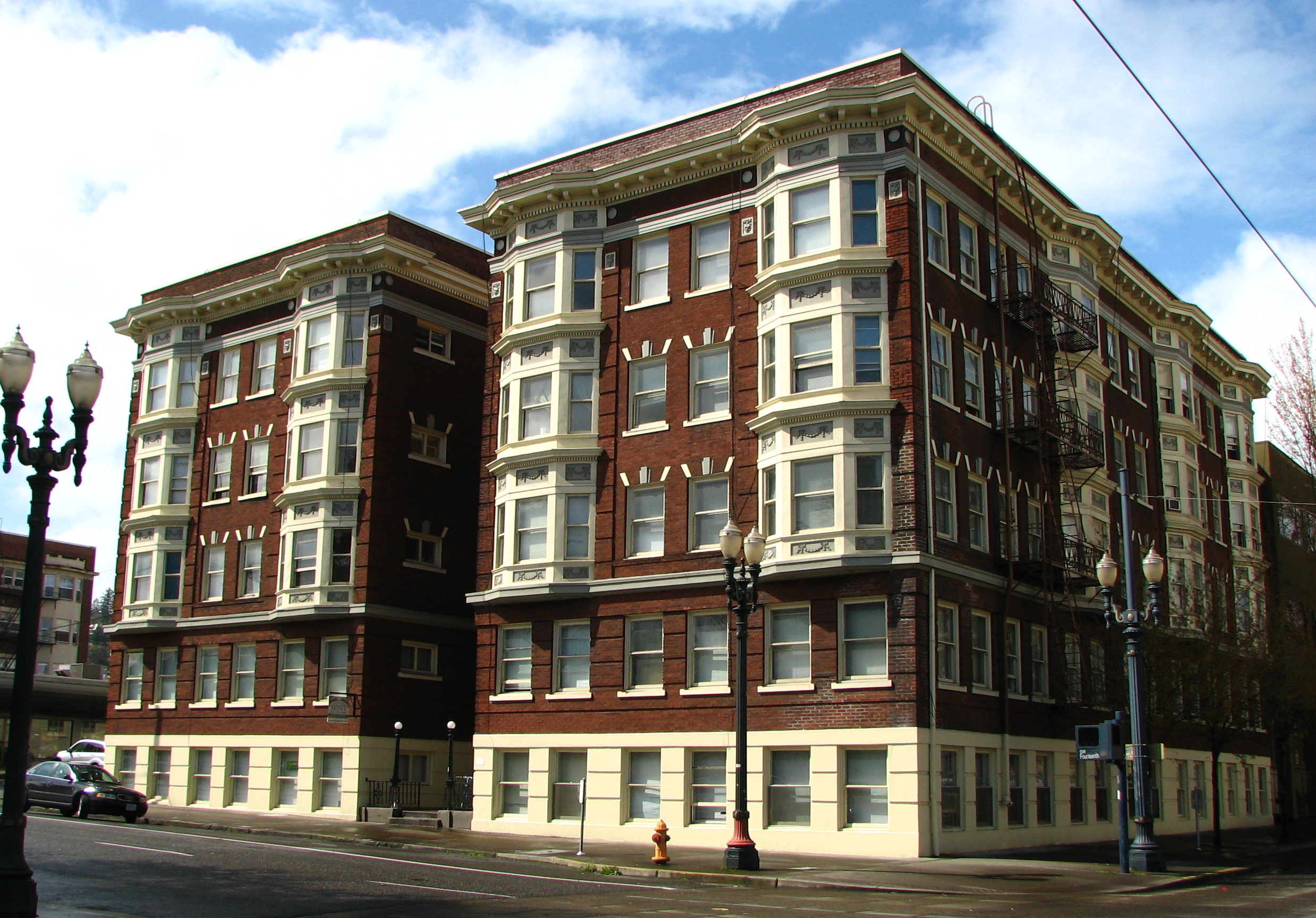
- The Brown Apartments in 2010

- Location within Portland, Oregon Location within Oregon Location within the United States
- Location: 807 SW 14th Avenue; Portland, Oregon
- Coordinates: 45°31′13″N 122°41′13″W
- Built: 1915
- Architect: Claussen and Claussen
- Architectural style: Colonial Revival, Beaux Arts, American Renaissance
- NRHP reference No.: 91001553
- Added to NRHP: October 17, 1991

The Brown Apartments is a building complex located in downtown Portland, Oregon, listed on the National Register of Historic Places.

== See also ==
- National Register of Historic Places listings in Southwest Portland, Oregon
