= Loyalty Building =

Historic building in Portland, Oregon, U.S.

- Buyers Building
- U.S. National Register of Historic Places
- Portland Historic Landmark
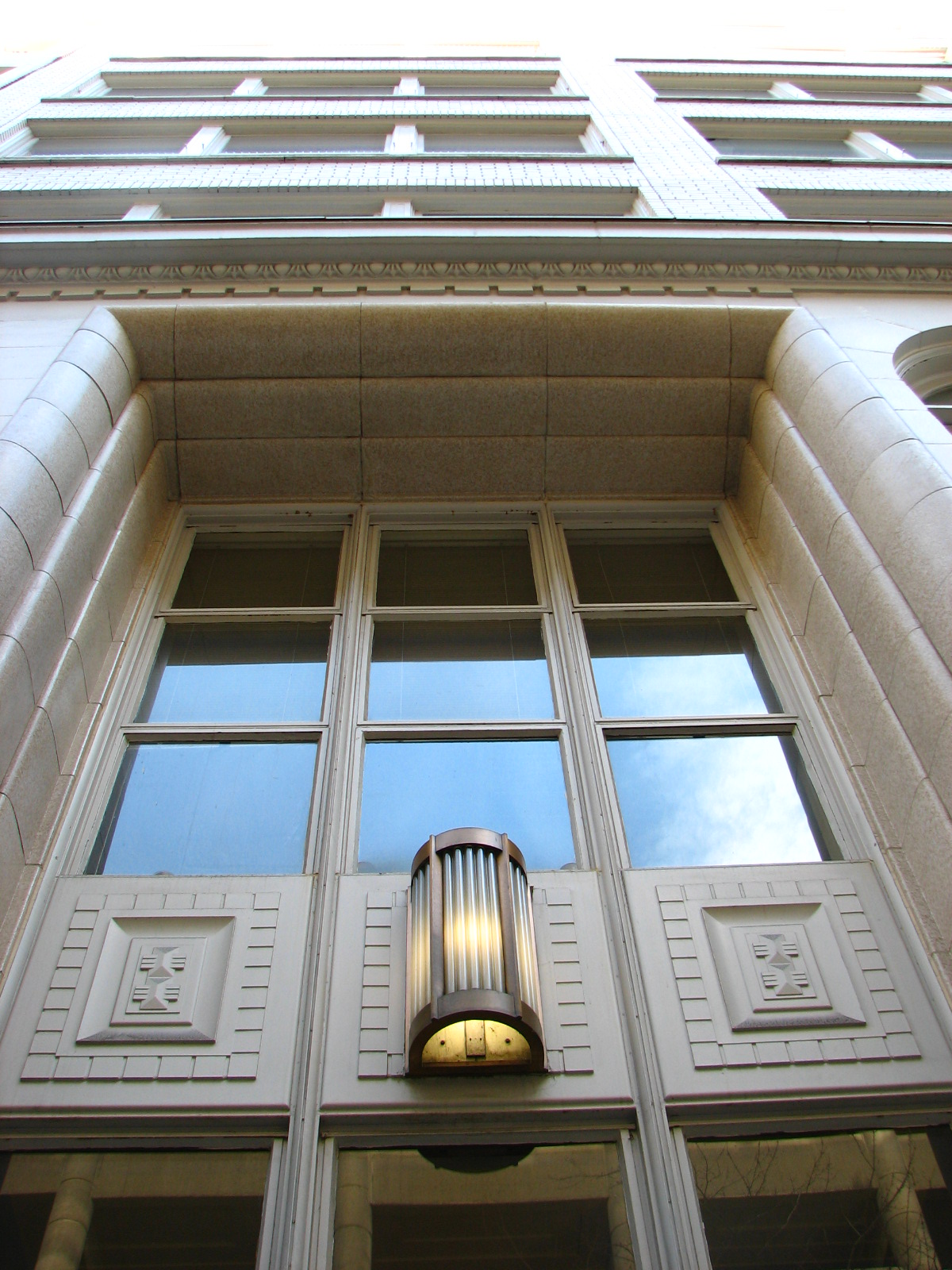
- Entrance to the Buyers Building in 2009

- Location within Portland, Oregon Location within Oregon Location within the United States
- Location: 317 SW Alder Street; Portland, Oregon
- Coordinates: 45°31′09″N 122°40′31″W
- Built: 1928
- Architect: Claussen and Claussen
- Architectural style: Chicago
- NRHP reference No.: 93001567
- Added to NRHP: January 28, 1994

The Loyalty Building, formerly known as the Buyers Building and the Guardian Building, is a building located in downtown Portland, Oregon listed on the National Register of Historic Places.

== See also ==
- National Register of Historic Places listings in Southwest Portland, Oregon
