= Ira F. Powers Warehouse and Factory =

Historic building in Portland, Oregon, U.S.

- U.S. National Register of Historic Places
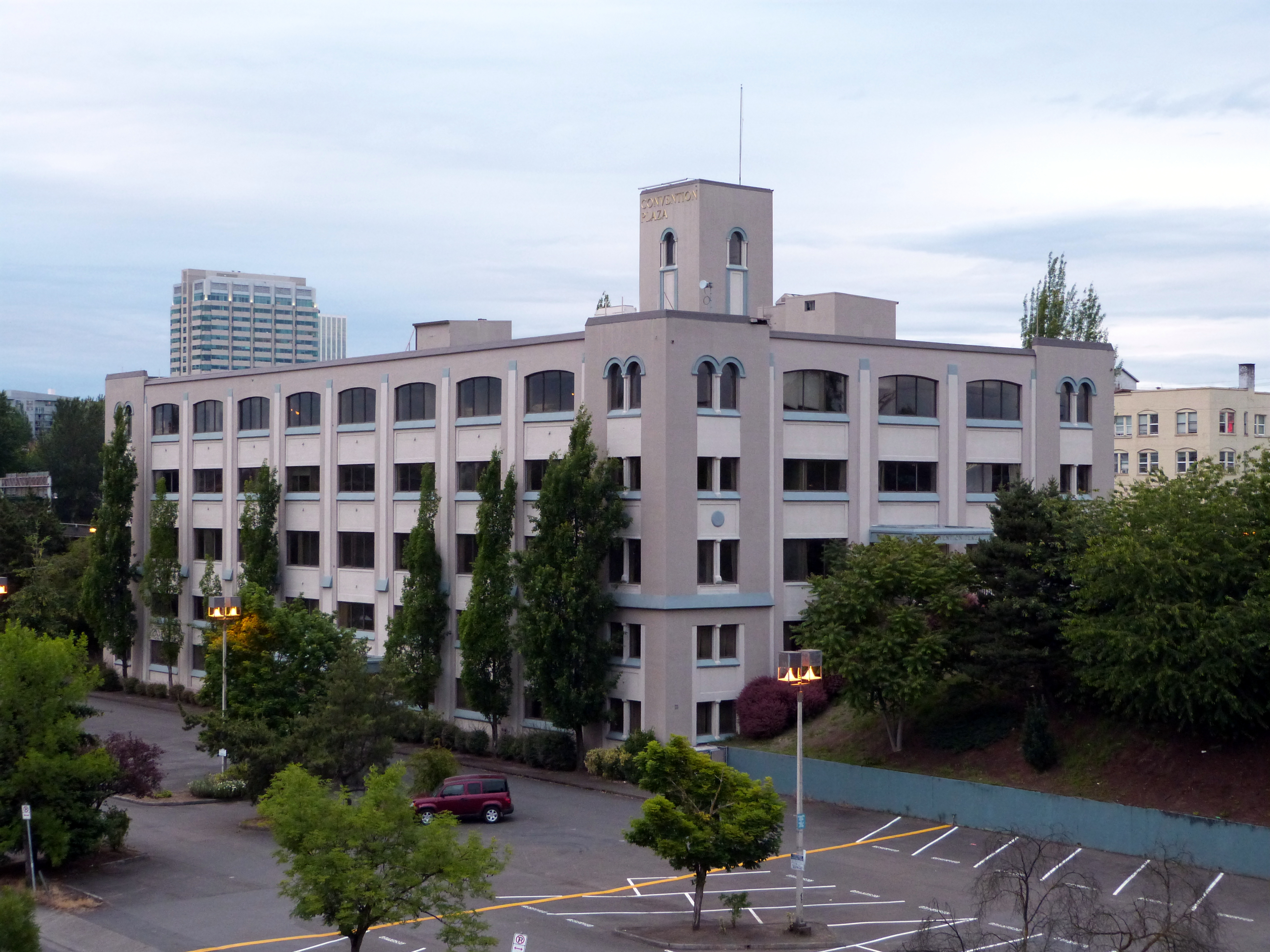
- The Powers Warehouse and Factory in 2012
- Location: 123 NE 3rd Avenue; Portland, Oregon
- Coordinates: 45°31′26″N 122°39′47″W
- Area: 1.18 acres (0.48 ha)
- Built: 1925
- Architect: Claussen and Claussen
- Architectural style: Commercial style, with Romanesque and Modernist influences
- NRHP reference No.: 11000625
- Added to NRHP: August 31, 2011

The Ira F. Powers Warehouse and Factory is a historic industrial building in Portland, Oregon, United States. Built in 1925, it is one of the last remnants of two important phases in Portland's economic history: the city's once-prominent furniture manufacturing and distribution industry, and worker housing for the war industries of the World War II era.

The warehouse was listed on the National Register of Historic Places in 2011.

== See also ==
- National Register of Historic Places listings in Northeast Portland, Oregon
