= Claussen and Claussen =

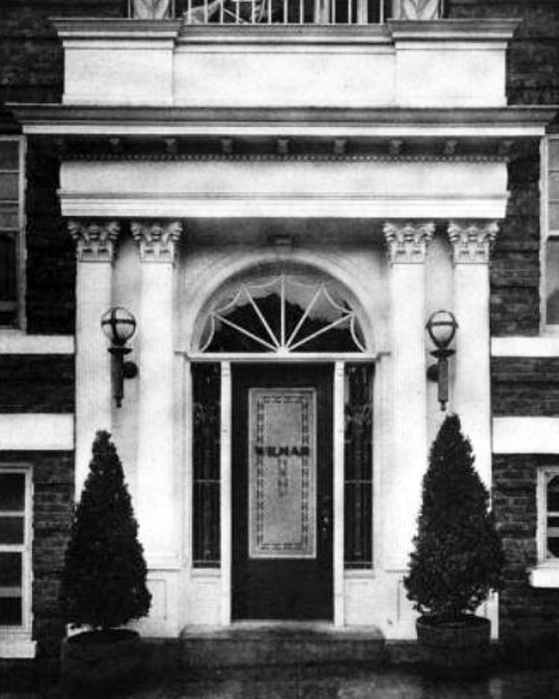
- A feature of the Wilmar Apartment Building, also known as the Marshall Apartments, designed by Claussen and Claussen in 1911
- Industry: Architecture
- Founders: William Emil Claussen; Hans Fred Claussen
- Fate: Dissolved
- Headquarters: Macleay Building, Portland, Oregon

Claussen and Claussen was an architecture firm based in Portland, Oregon, that designed several prominent buildings in the first half of the 20th century. Some of the buildings have been added to the National Register of Historic Places, including the Roosevelt Hotel, the Park Heathman Hotel, the Loyalty Building, Ira Powers Warehouse, and Portland Van and Storage.

== History ==
William Emil Claussen (January 27, 1878 – November 10, 1953) and his brother, Hans Fred Claussen (January 26, 1880 – April 1, 1942), moved from Chicago to Portland in 1908 and formed the architectural firm, Claussen and Claussen. Reasons for the move are speculative, although Portland had sustained a period of record growth from 1890 to 1900 and at the time had the largest area of any city on the Pacific Coast. Moreover, after the Lewis and Clark Centennial Exposition in 1905, Portland experienced another period of rapid growth that placed enormous demands on architects and builders.

Claussen and Claussen took its place among established Portland architectural firms in 1908 and immediately began designing the E.C. Fety Building (demolished) at SW Second and Main Street at a cost of $7,500.

In 1915 the firm submitted plans for a remodel of Portland City Hall that featured a conversion of balcony space above the city council chamber into offices.

In the 1930s, the firm designed several retail outlets for the Fred Meyer company, including the Hollywood location at NE 41st and Sandy that featured innovative roof parking. In the 1920s, businessman Fred Meyer and his wife had lived in a building designed by Claussen and Claussen. Meyer had purchased the Music Box Theater, formerly the Pantages, in 1928 and had hired the firm to redesign the block for office and retail space that would become the Alderway Building. Claussen and Claussen had been able to preserve the steel frame of the Pantages in planning the four-story structure.

Many Claussen and Claussen structures have been demolished to meet the changing needs of the community, for example, the First English Evangelical Church at SE Sixth and Market and the Turnverein building at SW 13th and Madison. And some structures were never built as in the case of the Machinery Building, a $600,000, seven-story industrial proposal bounded by SW First, Ash, Second, and Pine.

The architects worked nonstop until the death of Fred Claussen in 1942, but Claussen and Claussen continued until the death of William Claussen in 1953.

== Partial list of surviving buildings ==
- Adventist Medical Center (SE 60th and Belmont)
- Ajax Rubber Co. Building (NW 12th and Flanders)
- Alderway Building (SW Broadway and Alder)
- Buildings at Bonneville Dam
- Bretnor Apartments (931 NW 20th Avenue)
- Brown Apartments (Sw 14th and Yamhill)
- Empress Apartments (NW 16th and Burnside)
- Falcon Art Studios (NE Fremont and Michigan)
- Frank Fink Warehouse (SE 3rd and Yamhill)
- Goldstein Building (8128 North Denver Avenue)
- Holsman Apartments (NW 21st and Overton)
- Ira Powers Warehouse (123 NE 3rd)
- Kent Apartments (SE 20th and Belmont)
- Knight Packing Co. Expansion (SE 8th and Alder)
- LaSalle Apartments (SE 15th and Madison)
- Laurelhurst School (840 NE 41st Avenue)
- Loyalty Building (SW 3rd and Alder)
- Northrup Apartments (2445 NW Northrup Street)
- Marshall Apartments (NW 22nd Place and Everett)
- May Apartments (SW 14th and Taylor)
- Milwaukie Elementary School (SE 27th and Washington, Milwaukie)
- Murray Apartments (SE 37th and Belmont)
- Oregon Tuberculosis Hospital (400 East Scenic Drive, The Dalles)
- Palace Court Apartments (NW 22nd and Flanders)
- Park Heathman Hotel (SW Park and Salmon)
- Portland Van and Storage (N Broadway and Benton)
- Raintree Apartments (924 SW 16th Avenue)
- Red Men Hall (SE Ninth and Hawthorne)
- Roosevelt Hotel (SW Park and Salmon)
- Stadium Fred Meyer (100 NW 20th Place)
- Stephenson Building (SW Broadway and Salmon)
- United Fruit and Produce Building (SE 3rd and Washington)
- West Linn City Hall (Willamette Dr. and Mill St.)

== See also ==
- History of Portland, Oregon
