= Roosevelt Hotel (Portland, Oregon) =

Historic building in Portland, Oregon, U.S.

- U.S. National Register of Historic Places
- Portland Historic Landmark
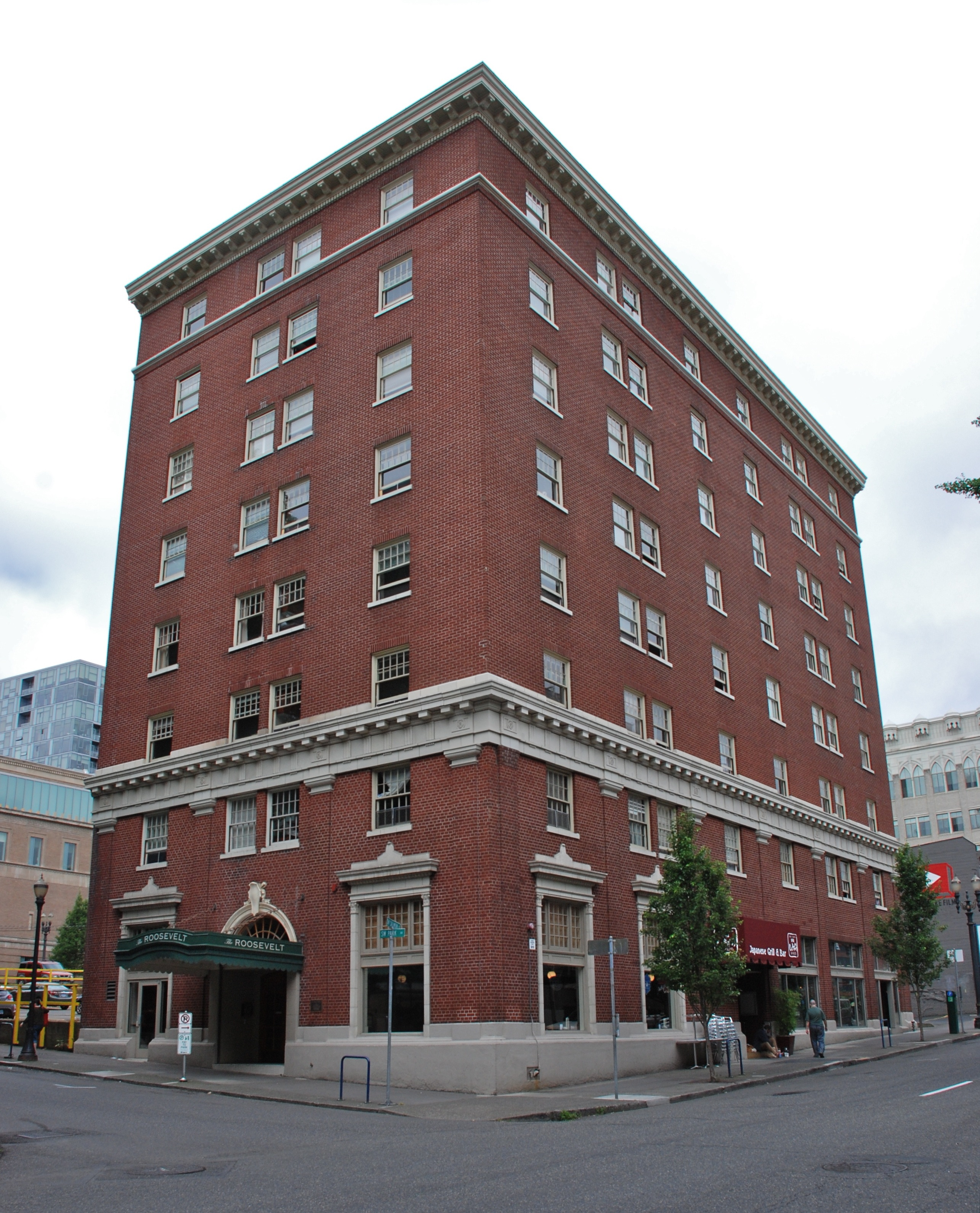
- Viewed from the northeast in 2014

- Location within Portland, Oregon
- Location: 1005 SW Park Avenue; Portland, Oregon
- Coordinates: 45°31′04″N 122°40′57″W
- Built: 1924
- Architect: Claussen and Claussen
- Architectural style: Early Commercial
- NRHP reference No.: 98000211
- Added to NRHP: March 5, 1998

The Roosevelt Hotel was a hotel located in downtown Portland, Oregon at 1005 SW Park. It was built in 1924 and is listed on the National Register of Historic Places. In 2000–2001 the building was converted to condominiums.

The exterior facade of the building underwent restoration work in 2010.

== See also ==
- National Register of Historic Places listings in Southwest Portland, Oregon
