= Blackstone Hall (Portland State University) =

Building on the Portland State University campus in Portland, Oregon, U.S.

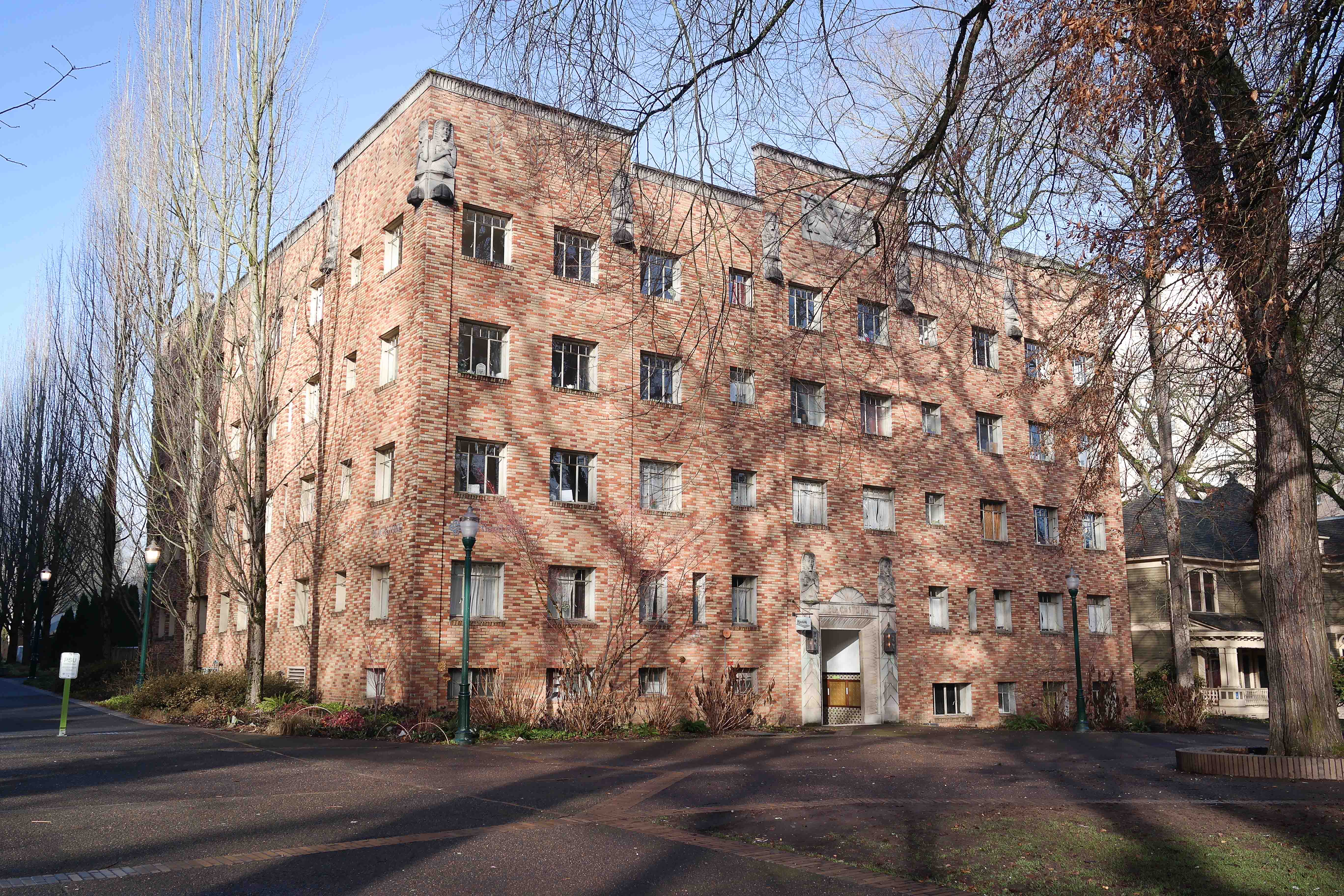
- Blackstone Hall in 2014

- Location within Portland, Oregon
- Former names: Blackstone Apartments

General information
- Type: Residence hall
- Architectural style: Exotic
- Location: 1831 SW Park Avenue, Portland, Oregon
- Coordinates: 45.5119°N 122.6854°W
- Construction started: April, 1930
- Completed: August, 1930
- Cost: $300,000
- Landlord: Portland State University

Technical details
- Floor count: 5

Design and construction
- Architect: Elmer Feig

Blackstone Hall was a five-story student residence hall at Portland State University in Portland, Oregon, a city in the United States. The building contained five two-bedroom units, 19 one-bedroom units, 14 studios, and 13 sleepers that share a bath, shower, and kitchen. The building was demolished in 2026.

== History ==
The Blackstone Apartment building was designed by architect Elmer Feig in 1930 for owner and real estate developer Harry Mittleman and is considered an outstanding example of Feig's work. Mittleman was known for employing large numbers of workers and finishing construction within months after beginning. In late March, 1930, Mittleman applied for an exemption to Portland's building code that would allow him to place a backyard on the side of the 100-foot square lot that would become Blackstone Apartments at 395 West Park Street. The address was later changed to 1831 SW Park Avenue according to the 1933 street renumbering system. In early April, Mittleman estimated construction costs at $120,000 and began excavation soon thereafter. By summer the building was completed at a cost of $300,000. The new apartment building offered a "gorgeously furnished," five-room suite and choice, smaller units.

Mittleman's office was on the ground floor of the Blackstone, and from there he managed construction of other apartment buildings on SW Park Avenue, including Parkway Manor and Jeanne Manor. On March 1, 1931, a bomb exploded outside Mittleman's office. No injuries were reported, and the case was never solved.

Portland State University acquired the property in 1969. The building was demolished in 2026 to make way for a new student housing building.

The entranceway of Blackstone Hall during demolition.
