= Harry Mittleman =

- Born: May 24, 1900; Russian Poland
- Died: August 1, 1985 (aged 85); Portland, Oregon
- Occupation: Real estate developer
- Spouse: Helen Aronson
- Children: 4
- Parent(s): Morris Mittleman; Dora Zwibelman

Harry Mittleman (May 24, 1900 – August 1, 1985) was a prominent building contractor, apartment owner, and real estate developer in Portland, Oregon. During his career, he built more than 20 apartment buildings and owned 30 bank buildings. Mittleman owned the Sovereign Hotel for 34 years. The Mittleman Jewish Community Center at the Schnitzer Family Campus is named after Mittleman's wife, Helen Mittleman.

== Early years ==
Harry Mittleman was born in 1900 within a region of Europe he called Russian Poland. His father was a peddler. The family immigrated to the United States in 1911 to escape the Persecution of Jews prior to World War I, settling in Omaha, Nebraska. In 1922 Mittleman moved to Castle Rock, Washington, and opened a series of grocery stores in the surrounding area. He moved to Portland in 1925 and opened six more stores.

== Apartment and real estate construction ==
Citing stiff competition in the grocery business, Mittleman liquidated his grocery stores and built his first apartment building in 1928. He named it Marian Court after one of his daughters. Other apartment construction followed, and Queen Louise Apartments, Babette Manor, Adelle Manor, Charmaine Manor, Jeanne Manor, and Saint Helen's Court were named after Mittleman family members.

Mittleman was a fast builder, and he hired extra workers in the early years of the Depression era to provide jobs. At a lot that would become Parkway Manor, for example, Mittleman announced that a steam shovel would begin digging even before the architects had designed the building. Parkway Manor construction employed up to 250 workers on a 5-story project at a cost of $250,000 in 1930. Mittleman would construct more than 20 apartment buildings, and his motto was, "What Mittleman builds builds Portland!"

Mittleman built Marlene Village residential development in 1949.

With the expansion of Portland State University in 1969, Mittleman saw a need to provide space for student housing. He sold some of his SW Park Avenue apartment buildings to the Oregon University System. Some of the buildings were demolished; for example, the Queen Louise apartment building was torn down to make room for the Branford Price Millar Library. The Blackstone Apartment building, the Saint Helen's Court, and the Parkway Manor, however, remained standing.

== Acquisition of bank buildings ==
In 1972 Mittleman liquidated his remaining holdings and purchased 29 United States National Bank of Oregon buildings, becoming the largest individual owner of bank buildings in Oregon. He also acquired the Bank of California tower (now known as the Union Bank Tower).

== Jewish Community Center ==
Mittleman served as president of Portland's Jewish Community Center for ten years, and he paid the outstanding mortgage on the center. The name was changed to Mittleman Jewish Community Center in 1976 to honor the memory of Mittleman's wife, Helen.

Harry Mittleman died at his home in Portland on August 1, 1985.
