= Six-man football =

Variant of American football

Six-man football is a variant of gridiron football played with six players per team, instead of the standard 11. It is generally played by high schools in rural areas of the United States and Canada.

== History ==
Six-man football was developed in 1934 by Stephen Epler in Chester, Nebraska, as an alternative means for small high schools to field a football team during the Great Depression. The first game was played on Thursday, September 27, 1934, at the Hebron, Nebraska, Athletic Gridiron, with a crowd of almost 1000 watching. This game was played so that coaches all over Kansas and Nebraska could see if they wanted to try this new game of six-man. The two teams playing in the game were the combined team from Hardy-Chester ("Hard-Chests") and a combined team from Belvidere-Alexandria ("Belvalex"). The two teams had two weeks to practice prior to this game; they played to a 19-19 tie. After that night, rules for the game were distributed to about 60,000 coaches in the United States.

On October 5, 1940, Windham High School from Windham, Ohio, defeated Stamford Collegiate of Niagara Falls, Ontario, 39-1 in the first international six-man football game.

== Game play ==
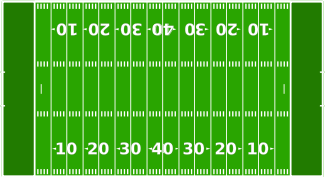
An American six-man playing field

The two versions of six-man football are American and Canadian.

Six-man American football is played on an 80-yard-long (73-m) by 40-yard-wide (37-m) field in most circumstances; the high school rulebook allows games to be held on a normal 100-yd (91-m) by 53 1/3-yd (48.8-m) field used in 11-man football if the teams and leagues so choose. Furthermore, the game specifies a 15-yard distance (14-m) from the line of scrimmage to gain a first down, instead of the normal 10 yards (9 m).

Six-man Canadian football is similar, but the length of the field can be either 100 or 110 yards long by 40 yards wide. End zones can be either 10 yards or up to 20 yards deep. Normal 12-man Canadian fields are 110 yards long and 65 yards wide, with 20-yard end zones and 10 yards to gain a first down, with the offense provided three downs to gain sufficient yardage rather than four downs as in the American game; this remains unchanged in the six-man variant.

All six players are eligible to be receivers in the American game, while in the Canadian game, the player in the centre of the offensive line is ineligible. On offense, three linemen are required on the line of scrimmage at the start of the play. The player to whom the ball is snapped cannot advance the ball past the line of scrimmage (thus eliminating such plays as the bootleg or scramble); if the ball is tossed to another player, however, that player can run or throw the ball and the player to whom the ball was snapped is still an eligible receiver. All forward passes to the player who snapped the ball (center) must travel at least 1 yard (1 m) in flight.

== Scoring ==
Six-man American football scoring is the same as for 11 men, except on the point after touchdown (PAT) attempt and the field goal. A point-after kick is worth two points, while a conversion made by running or passing the ball is worth one point. A field goal is worth four points instead of three. These rule changes were made because of the difficulty of successfully getting a kick off with so few blockers on the line compared to the number of defenders. Six-man Canadian football also inverts the point values of PATs and conversions, but retains the three-point field goal, and also retains the one-point rouge that is unique to the Canadian game.

In both University Interscholastic League and Texas Association of Private and Parochial Schools competition, a 45-point "mercy rule" exists to prevent lopsided scoring deficits (no such rule exists in the standard Texan game). The game is ended under this rule if a team is losing by 45 or more points at halftime or at any point after. The mercy rule is alluded to in the title of the David Morse film about six-man football, The Slaughter Rule. In Canada, a 35-point mercy rule is used that changes the clock to be constantly running rather than ending the game immediately.

Scoring tends to be much higher in six-man games, which have exceeded 100 points several times per season.

== Modernity ==
As of the 2025-2026 alignments from UIL, TAPPS, TAIAO, TCAF, and TCAL, the state of Texas has 324 six-man football teams (79 in UIL Division I, 74 in UIL Division II, 63 in TAPPS 50 in TAIAO, 7 in TCAF, 5 in TCAL and 16 that play independently).

The state of Florida has 32 teams playing six-man football in the Florida Christian Association of Private and Parochial Schools. FCAPPS comprises small Christian or private schools and at least one home-school cooperative. Teams in the conference are as far south as the Florida Keys to as far north as Jacksonville.

The state of Alabama has eight teams playing as part of the Christian Football Association, which is a sister organization to the Alabama Christian Education Athletic Association.

The state of Colorado has 23 teams currently playing six-man football, with the majority of teams being from small towns located in eastern Colorado.

As of 2013, Idaho has two teams that play six-man football; they play against makeshift junior varsity teams or teams in Montana. Idaho has not sanctioned six-man football, but approved it for a pilot program. It was made particularly for schools that were small and too far removed geographically to have a reasonable co-operative program with a neighboring school. Idaho did play six-man football in the 1940s.

The sport is also played by high schools in Kansas, Montana, Nebraska, New Mexico, North Dakota, Oregon, and Wyoming, and in parts of Canada.

As of 2013, no leagues (professional, semiprofessional, or amateur) play the game past the high-school level. The last one, the San Antonio-based Texas Sixman Football League, converted to eight-man football after the 2012 season. The Central Florida-based Southeastern Christian Association of Sixman Football ceased operations in the late 2000s, and the Pennsylvania 6-Man Football League also converted to eight-man around the same time.

Currently, a women's league is playing six-(wo)man football – the Independent Women's Football League.

In 2024, The Arena League launched a professional league under the six-man format. The Arena League plays on a standard indoor American football field, but without goalposts (and thus no kicking). In 2025, TAL shifted to a seven-on-seven format, stating that it felt that the seven-man format would be more palatable to a broader audience.

== Literature ==
In 2025, coach Travis Robinson wrote the book "Modern Six Man Football Plays", the first of its kind written in 20 years. Robinson brought modern ideas to Six-man football literature, writing about over 65 unique schemes that all include a QR code that readers can also scan to watch the very same film clip that inspired that page. Robinson is trying to break the 20-year barrier of scheme-based literature in Six-man and is now writing articles on sixmanfootball.com.

In 2005, coach C.H. Underwood authored what is considered to be the definitive strategy and playbook for the game, Six Man Football, published by Bright Sky Press. A player during the 1960s and coach of the first Texas State Six-Man Championship team in 1972, Underwood provides a thorough dissertation on the small-town sport from both analytical and historical perspectives.

Another Bright Sky Press book, published in 2003, Grit and Glory: Six-Man Football, is a collection of photographs that capture the spirit of the game and its players. Grit and Glory exclusively showcases the work of art photographer Laura Wilson, mother of actors Owen, Luke, and Andrew Wilson.

In 2009, Dee Kelly wrote a fictional book, A Good Man's Sin, based on a boy moving from the city to the country and playing six-man football in Indian Gap, Texas, before making it to the NFL. It explains the rules of the game and small-town football. It portrays the mid-1970s six-man football teams in central Texas consistently to the teams of that time when Cherokee and Marathon were powerhouses.

== Film ==
The Slaughter Rule, released in 2002, used six-man football as played in Montana as the backdrop for an examination of the relationship between a fatherless renegade football player and his loner coach. The film contains a brief but adequate explanation of how the game of six-man football is played, as well as footage of actual game sequences. The title refers to a rule in which a game is called in the second half if one team gains a 45-point advantage over the other. In other states, it is referred to as the mercy rule. When invoked, one team is said to have "45ed" the other.

Six Man, Texas, released in 2008, is a documentary film that explores six-man football as identity in the public high schools of the 160 small towns in Texas that play it.

The Seventh Man, released in 2003, documents two years in the lives of the Panther Creek Panthers, one of the storied programs in Texas six-man football. It features the narration of Val Kilmer.

A Texas-6 CBS documentary looks at the 2019 Strawn Greyhounds, who had won four titles and were trying to repeat with the coach who made it all happen.

== See also ==
- Eight-man football
- Nine-man football
