= St. Helens Court (Portland State University) =

Building in Portland, Oregon, United States

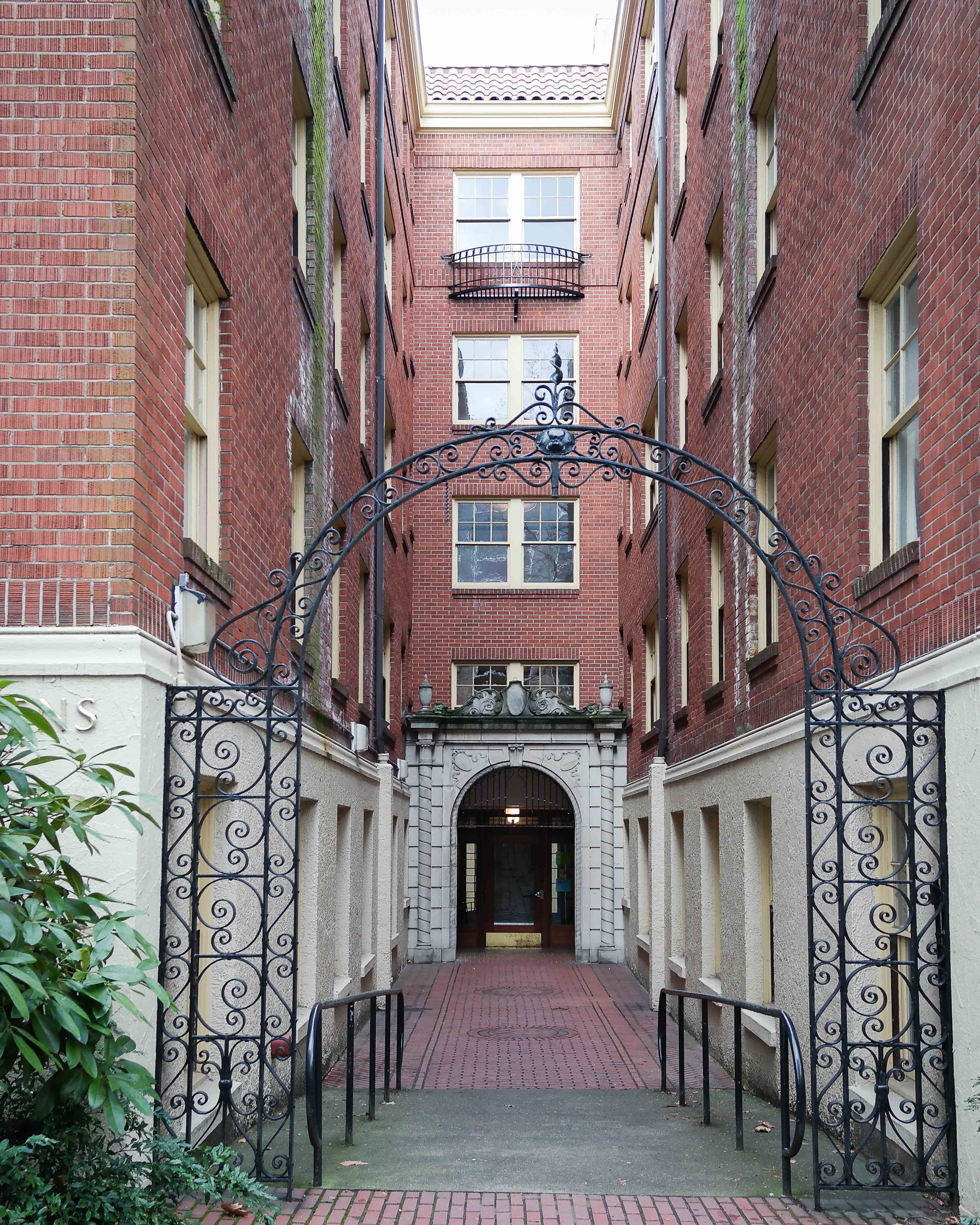
- St. Helens Court in 2014

- Location within Portland, Oregon
- Former names: Saint Helens Court

General information
- Type: Residence hall
- Architectural style: Mediterranean Revival
- Location: 1131 SW Montgomery St., Portland, Oregon
- Coordinates: 45.5136°N 122.6845°W
- Completed: June 25, 1927
- Cost: $300,000
- Landlord: Portland State University

Technical details
- Floor count: 5

St. Helens Court is a five-story student residence hall at Portland State University in Portland, Oregon, United States. The building contains 36 studios and 15 one-bedroom units.

== History ==
St. Helens Court was constructed in 1927 by real estate developer Harry Mittleman as a luxury apartment building. The steel reinforced concrete design was faced with red veneer brick and Mediterranean Revival decorations, suggesting Spanish influence. The 50 apartments, each with two or three rooms, were furnished with "warm, well-appointed" Spanish-style items and a radio, electric refrigeration, and electric ranges.

The owner considered his wife, Helen, to be a saint. For that reason, the building was named Saint Helen's Court and later St. Helens Court.

Portland State University acquired the property in 1969.
