= Stephen Epler =

American academic administrator (1909–1997)

Stephen Edward Epler (1909–1997) was an American academic administrator who founded what is now Portland State University (PSU). In 1934 he developed six-man football for small high schools, and in 1940 became the dean of men at Southern Oregon College in Ashland, Oregon. After serving in the United States Navy in World War II, he founded the Vanport Extension Center in 1946, which later became PSU; he succeeded in keeping the institution running after the building housing it was destroyed in the 1948 Vanport flood. After being passed over as dean and later president of the institution, he accepted presidency of Reedley College in California and then the College of Marin. In 1966, he was chosen as first president and superintendent of Ohlone College.

Epler died in Carmichael, California, in 1997. A residence hall at PSU is named for him.
