= Marlene Village, Oregon =

Unincorporated community in the state of Oregon, United States

- Unincorporated community and Census designated place
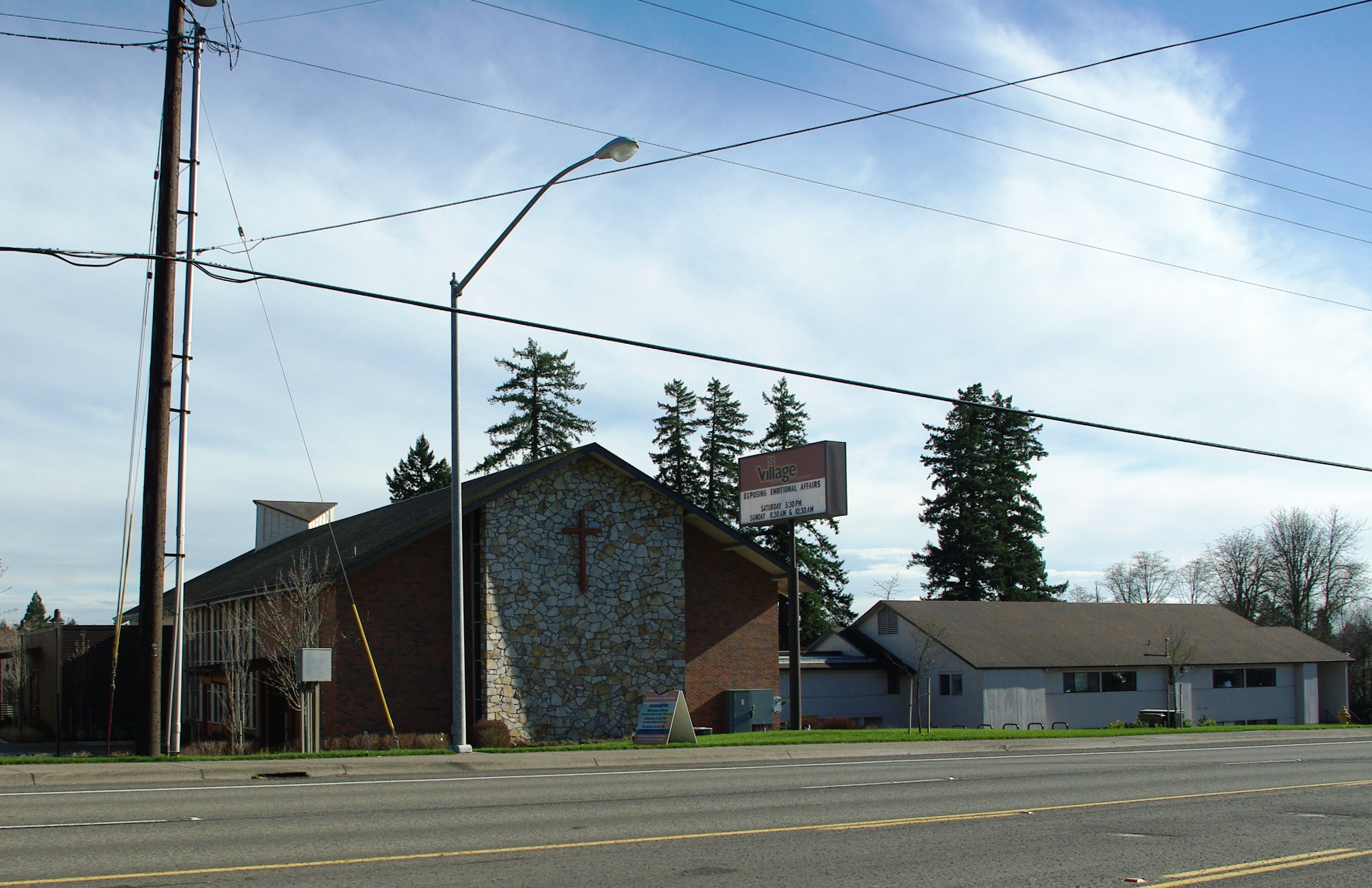
- Village Church in the community

- Location within Oregon Location within the United States
- Coordinates: 45°31′02″N 122°49′12″W
- Country: United States
- State: Oregon
- County: Washington
- Established: 1949
- Elevation: 240 ft (73 m)
- Time zone: UTC-8 (Pacific (PST))
  - Summer (DST): UTC-7 (PDT)
- ZIP code: 97005, 97006, 97229
- Area codes: 503 and 971
- GNIS feature ID: 2812897

Marlene Village is an unincorporated community in Washington County, Oregon, United States, and within the Portland metropolitan area. As of the 2020 census, Marlene Village had a population of 5,485. It is located immediately northwest of Cedar Hills and south of the Sunset Highway (U.S. 26), lying east and west of Murray Blvd. Marlene Village began as a 400-home "low-cost residential development" on which construction started in early 1949. It was named after Marlene Schnitzer, the then-infant granddaughter of the project's Portland-based developer, Harry Mittleman. The first block of 50 homes went on sale in August 1949. Fire protection and EMS services are provided through Tualatin Valley Fire and Rescue.

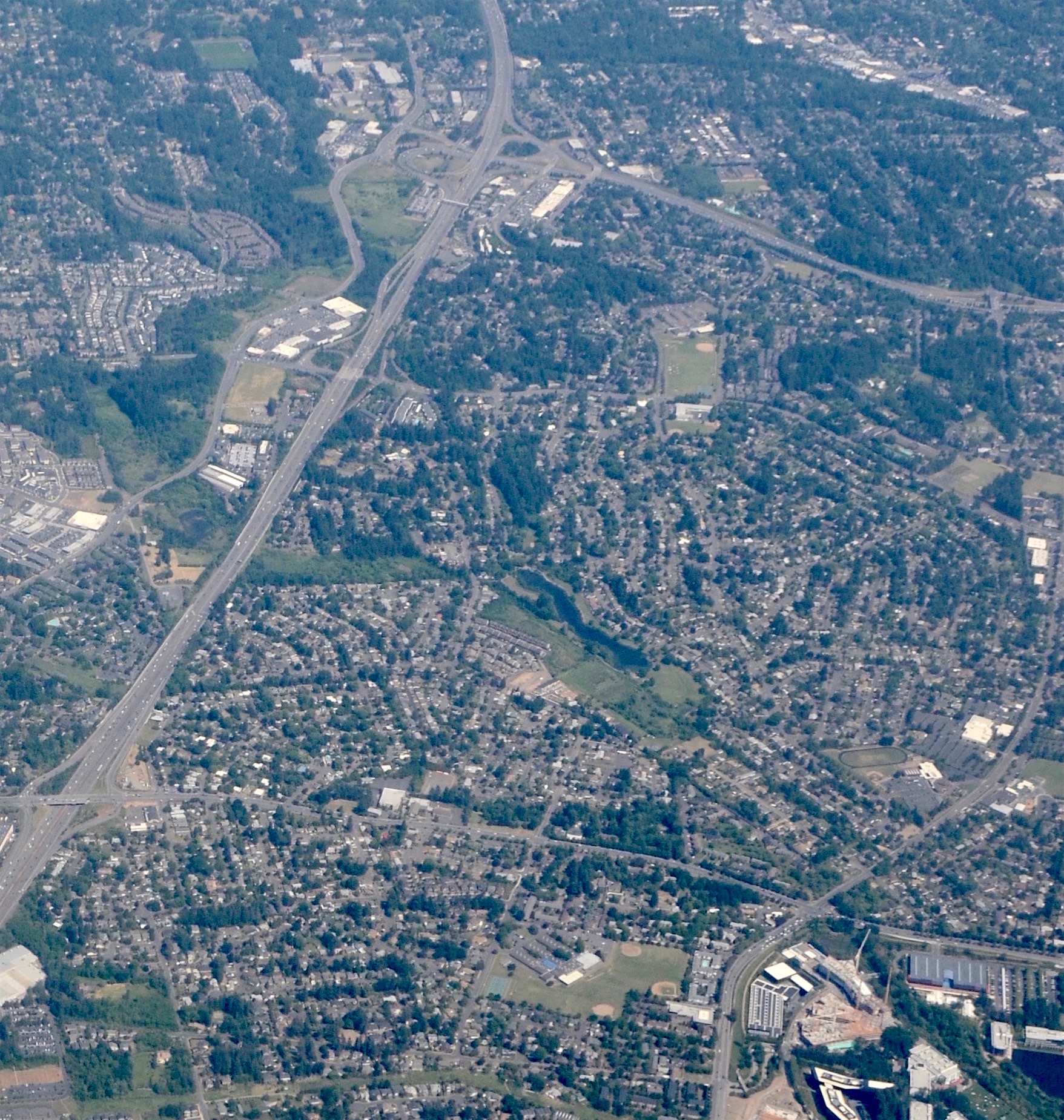
Aerial view, from the west, with Marlene Village in the lower half of the frame and the Sunset Highway at left

== Education ==
It is in the Beaverton School District 48J.
