= Jeanne Manor Apartment Building =

Historic building in Portland, Oregon, U.S.

- U.S. National Register of Historic Places
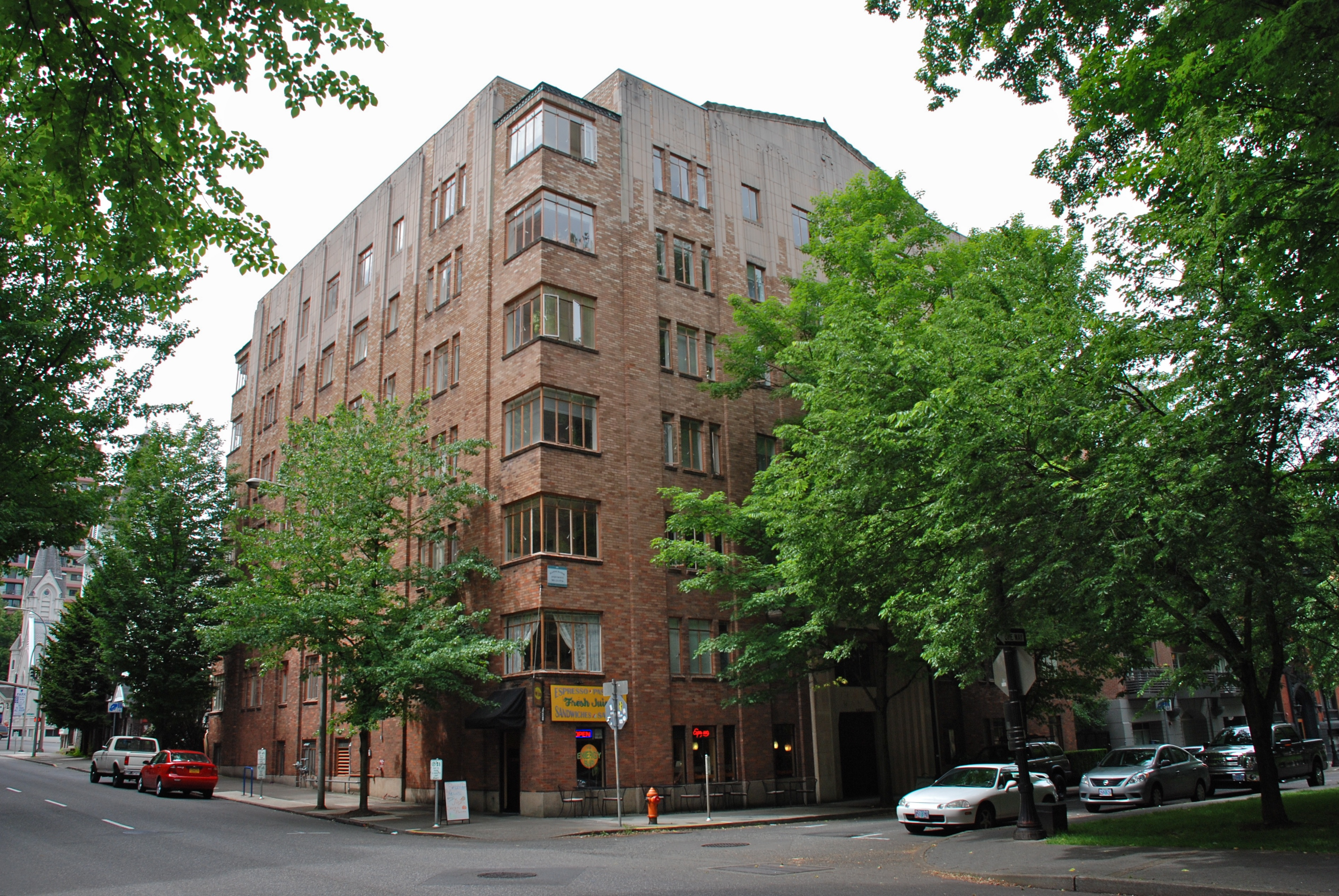
- The Jeanne Manor Apartment Building in 2014

- Location within Portland, Oregon Location within Oregon Location within the United States
- Location: 1431 SW Park Avenue; Portland, Oregon
- Coordinates: 45°30′53″N 122°41′03″W
- Area: 0.2 acres (0.081 ha)
- Built: 1931
- Architect: Bennes & Herzog
- Architectural style: Modern Movement
- NRHP reference No.: 98000201
- Added to NRHP: March 5, 1998

The Jeanne Manor Apartment Building is a seven-story apartment hi-rise located in downtown Portland, Oregon, in the United States, listed on the National Register of Historic Places. Architects Bennes and Herzog finished the Art Deco structure in 1931. The Jeanne Manor faces the South Park Blocks at the corner of Southwest Park Avenue and Clay Street.

Designed to reflect some of the features of Beaux-Arts apartment buildings along New York City's Park Avenue, the structure was reputedly selected by a group of American architects as an outstanding example of modern apartment design. Named for the daughter of owner Harry Mittleman, the building cost $400,000 and was part of a $1,000,000 investment made by Mittleman in SW Park Avenue apartment construction during the late 1920s and early 1930s. Marketing of the 72-suite building included the slogan, "In quest of the sun."

== See also ==
- National Register of Historic Places listings in Southwest Portland, Oregon
