= Parkway Manor (Portland State University) =

Building on the Portland State University campus in Portland, Oregon, U.S.

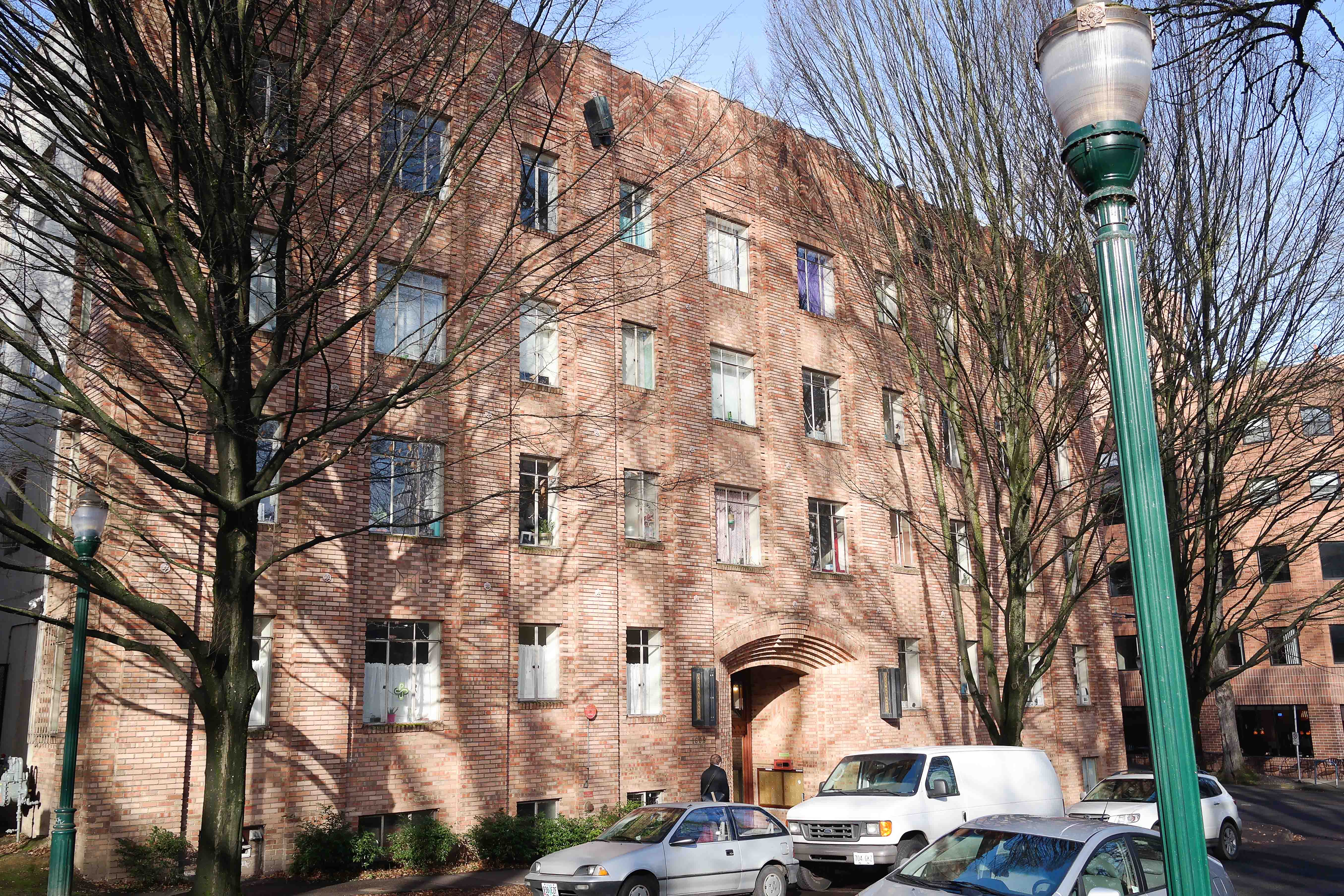
- Parkway Manor in 2014

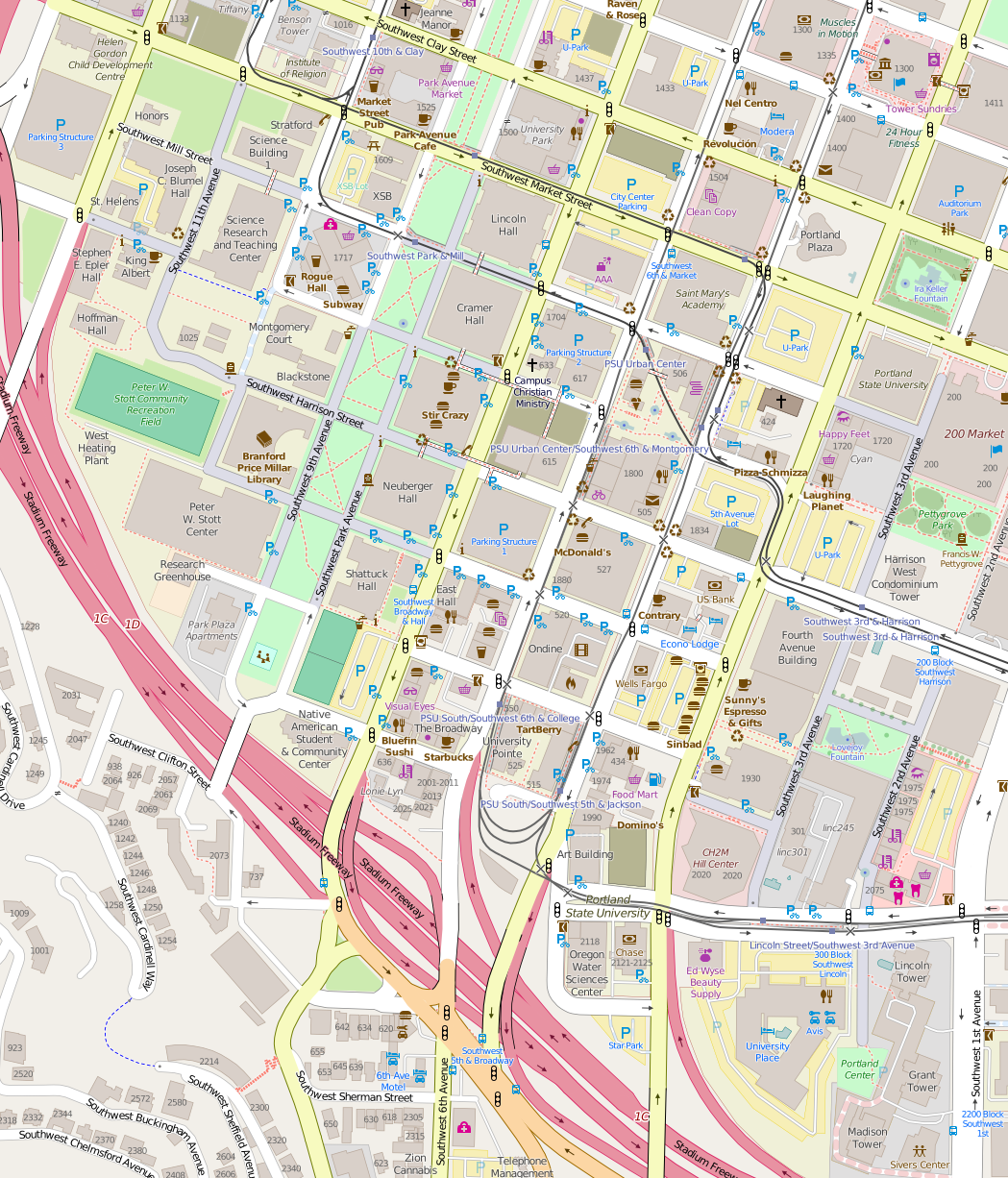
- Location on Portland State University campus

General information
- Type: Residence hall
- Architectural style: Art Deco
- Location: 1609 SW Park Avenue, Portland, Oregon
- Coordinates: 45.5136°N 122.6845°W
- Construction started: December 15, 1930
- Completed: April 10, 1931
- Cost: $250,000
- Landlord: Portland State University

Technical details
- Floor count: 5

Design and construction
- Architect: Bennes & Herzog

Parkway Manor was a five-story student residence hall at Portland State University in Portland, Oregon, a city in the United States. The building contained seven two-bedroom units, 24 one-bedroom units, 10 studios, and 13 sleepers that share a bath, shower, and kitchen. The building was demolished in 2023.

== History ==
Parkway Manor was designed by architects Bennes & Herzog in 1931 for owner and real estate developer Harry Mittleman. Mittleman had planned to begin construction sometime later, but he was pressured by the Citizens Employment Committee to hire as many workers as possible and break ground immediately as the Great Depression continued into its second year. He placed a steam shovel on the job site and began digging even before the architects had completed their design, and Mittleman created 250 jobs during construction.

The building opened a few months later with 42 units ranging from studios to four-room apartments. Each living room contained an artificial fireplace, and ceilings were covered with "California stucco," a then-new product with colorful pigments added at the factory.

Portland State University acquired the property in 1969. The building was demolished in 2023.
