= Portland State University =

Public university in Portland, Oregon, US

- Former names: Vanport Extension Center (1946–1955); Portland State College (1955–1969)
- Motto: Doctrina urbi serviat (Latin)
- Motto in English: "Let knowledge serve the city"
- Type: Public research university
- Established: 1946; 80 years ago
- Accreditation: NWCCU
- Academic affiliations: CUMU; GCU; HECC; ORAU; USU; Space-grant
- Endowment: $127.5 million (2025)
- President: Ann Cudd
- Academic staff: 1,951 (fall 2023)
- Total staff: 5,232 (fall 2023)
- Students: 21,040 (fall 2023)
- Undergraduates: 16,423 (fall 2023)
- Postgraduates: 4,617 (fall 2023)
- Location: Portland, Oregon, United States; 45°30′46″N 122°41′07″W
- Campus: 50 acres (20 ha); Large city
- Newspaper: Portland State Vanguard
- Colors: Green and white
- Nickname: Vikings
- Sporting affiliations: NCAA Division I FCS - Big Sky
- Mascot: Victor E. Viking
- Website: www.pdx.edu

Portland State University (PSU) is a public research university in Portland, Oregon, United States. It was founded in 1946 as a post-secondary educational institution for World War II veterans. It evolved into a four-year college over the next 20 years and was granted university status in 1969. It is one of two public universities in Oregon that are in a large city. It is governed by a board of trustees. PSU is classified among "R2: Doctoral Universities – High research activity".

Portland State comprises seven constituent colleges, offering undergraduate degrees in 123 fields and postgraduate degrees in 117 fields. As of 2023, the university had a total enrollment of approximately 21,000 students. Its athletic teams are known as the Portland State Vikings, with school colors of green and white. They compete at the NCAA Division I level, primarily in the Big Sky Conference.

== History ==
=== 1946–1964: Establishment ===
Portland State University was established as the Vanport Extension Center in June 1946, founded by Stephen Edward Epler, a native of Iowa. Epler graduated from Cotner College in Lincoln, Nebraska, and later Columbia University in New York City, before joining the army to fight in World War II. After returning to the United States after serving, Epler became a veterans' counselor in Oregon's General Extension Division in Portland. The Vanport Extension Center was conceived by Epler in order to satisfy the demand for higher education in Portland for returning World War II veterans, taking advantage of the G.I. Bill.

The first classes were held in the Vanport Junior High School and given its location in the Columbia River floodplain was promptly given the colloquial title, "The U by the Slough." This first summer session had 221 students, and tuition and fees were $50. Over 1,410 students registered for the 1946 fall term, which was delayed until October 7, 1946, due to a lack of space. Since the population in Vanport was decreasing after World War II, the extension center was able to use buildings created for other purposes: two childcare centers, a recreation building with three classrooms, and a shopping center, which required substantial modification to house a library, offices, and six classrooms. In addition to Vanport Junior High School, Lincoln and Jefferson high schools were used after school hours, as well as the University of Oregon's dental and medical schools, located in Portland.

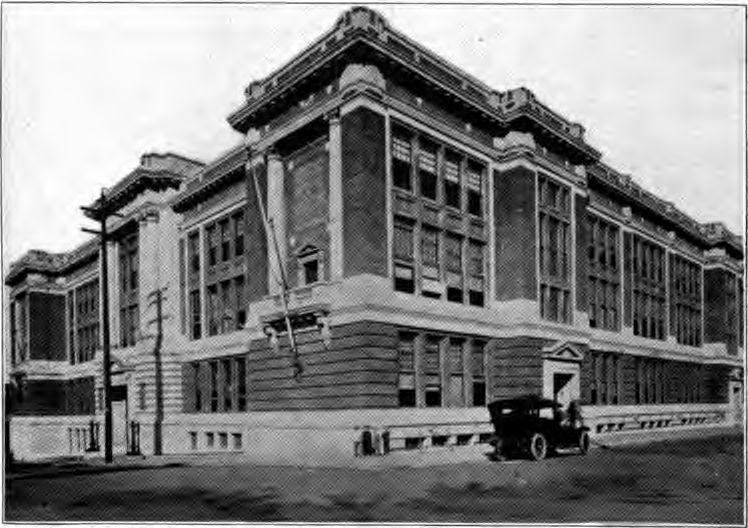
Lincoln Hall c. 1920. Then a high school, it now serves as the university's theatre and performing arts center.

Following the May 30 Vanport Flood of 1948, the college became known as "the college that wouldn't die" for refusing to close after the flood. The term was coined by Lois Hennessy, a student who wrote about the college and the flood in the Christian Science Monitor, though students nicknamed the school "The college without a future." (Hennessy was the mother of poet Gary Snyder.) The school occupied Grant High School in the summer of 1948, then to hastily converted buildings at the Oregon Shipyard, known as the Oregon Ship. In 1953, the school moved to downtown Portland and occupied the vacated buildings of Lincoln High School on SW Broadway Street, including Lincoln Hall, then known as "Old Main."

The school changed its name to the Portland State Extension Center between December 1951 and February 1952. In 1955, the Center changed its name to Portland State College to mark its maturation into a four-year degree-granting institution, although severe restrictions were placed on the college's curriculum and growth. Epler, who had campaigned for a presidency role at the college, was not elected by the State Board. Without an administrative stake in the college, Epler left and accepted presidency at Reedley College in California. By 1956, the veteran population at the college had subsided, and baby food was no longer stocked in the bookstore.

=== 1965–2000: Expansion and development ===
Architecture at the university was a topic of controversy in its early stages. In 1968, incoming university president Gregory Wolfe commented that the buildings were distressing evidence of Stalinist cubism on campus, although urban renewal chairman Ira Keller found them to be "perfectly lovely." Portland State University's growth for the next couple of decades was restricted under the Oregon University System's 1929 ruling that no public university or college in Oregon could duplicate the programs offered by another, with grandfathered exclusions for the University of Oregon and Oregon State University. Nevertheless, graduate programs were added in 1961 and doctoral programs were added in 1972. The institution was granted university status by the Oregon State Board of Higher Education in 1969, becoming Portland State University.

In 1993, PSU did away with the traditional undergraduate distribution system and adopted a new interdisciplinary general education program known as University Studies. The University Studies curriculum consists of one year of required freshman inquiry courses followed by a year of sophomore inquiry, junior cluster courses (which serve as upperclassmen electives) and, finally, a senior capstone; the senior capstone course serves as a "culmination of the University Studies program," and requires students to take part in a community-based project of their choosing, often followed by a public presentation on their experience in the project. The program garnered national attention for its learning communities, service-learning, senior capstones, and successful retention of first-year students. U.S. News & World Report has on multiple occasions listed University Studies as a "Program to Look For". In 1995, two years before his death, the university honored Stephen Epler for his contributions to the university's origins.

=== 2001–present ===
In 2003 Portland State was approved to award degrees in Black Studies. That same year the university opened a center housed in the Native American Student and Community Center. In 2004 the College of Engineering and Computer Science was renamed the Maseeh College of Engineering and Computer Science, after an alumnus Fariborz Maseeh.

In August 2020, citing the George Floyd protests as well as the killing of a Black man by PSU (campus police) officers in 2018, university President Stephen Percy announced that the campus police will no longer carry guns on patrol (though firearms will still be stored in the public safety office for use in case of an active shooter situation). In case of dangerous calls, Portland police will respond instead. The policy took effect on September 1, 2021. However, this policy was later reversed, and as of early 2023 campus police have resumed carrying weapons.

=== Founders and presidents ===
Founders and presidents of the university include:

- Stephen E. Epler (Vanport Extension Center), 1946–1952
- John F. Cramer, 1955–1958
- Brandford P. Millar, 1959–1968
- Gregory B. Wolfe, 1968–1974
- Joseph C. Blumel, 1974–1986
- Natale A. Sicuro, 1986–1988
- Roger N. Edgington (Interim President), 1988–1990
- Judith A. Ramaley, 1990–1997
- Daniel O. Bernstine, 1997–2007
- Michael F. Reardon (Interim President), 2007–2008
- Wim Wiewel, 2008–2017
- Rahmat Shoureshi, 2017–2019 (ousted)
- Stephen Percy (Interim President 2019–2020), 2020–2023
- Ann Cudd, 2023–present

== Academics ==
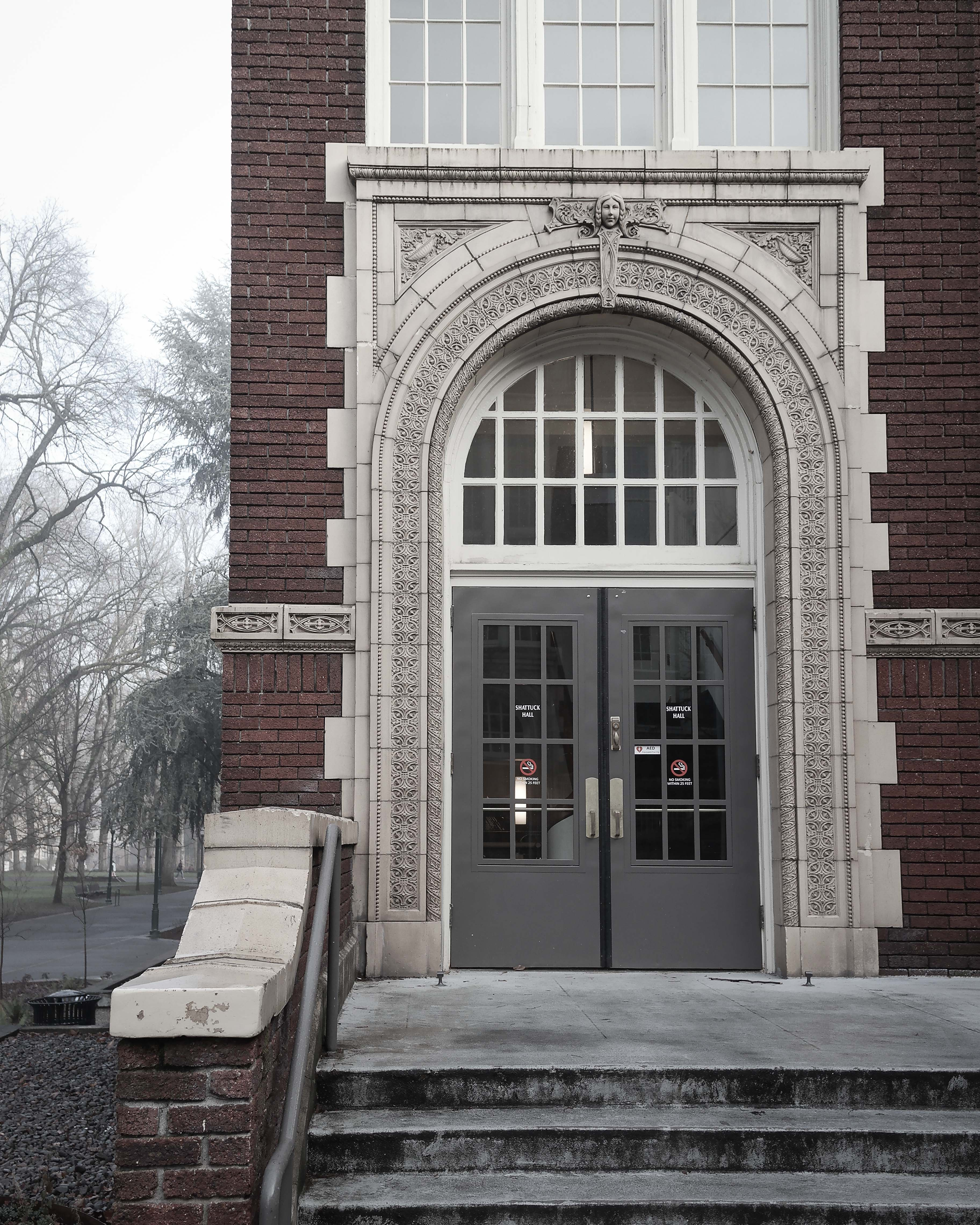
Shattuck Hall, home to the university's school of architecture

Portland State offers undergraduate degrees in one hundred twenty-three fields, and postgraduate degrees in one hundred and seventeen. The university has increasingly added more doctoral programs as it has grown from its original mission as a liberal arts undergraduate college into a more broad-based research university. Recently added fields where doctorates are awarded are mathematics, biology, chemistry, applied physics, computer science, applied psychology, engineering & technology management, mechanical engineering, and sociology. Graduate education is now offered in more than 70 master's degree programs, more than 30 graduate certificate programs, and 20 doctoral programs.

In 2006, the College of Urban and Public Affairs established Portland State University's first fully online degree. The Division of Criminology and Criminal Justice offers an online bachelor's degree in criminology and criminal justice as well as certificates in Advanced Crime Analysis, Criminal Behavior, Leadership in Criminal Justice, and a post-baccalaureate certificate in Criminology and Criminal Justice. Portland State awarded a total of 6,050 degrees for the 2014–15 academic year, including 4,250 bachelor's degrees, 1,725 master's degrees and 75 doctoral degrees.

=== Admissions ===
According to the U.S. News & World Report and Forbes, the university's acceptance rate was 95% in 2012, which was considered selective for a state university. According to Forbes in their 2015 survey, the university's acceptance rate was 61%. Portland State also has a dual enrollment agreement with Portland Community College and Clackamas Community College that allows students of the two schools to take courses at either school, and also complies with the Associate of Arts Oregon Transfer Degree curriculum (A.A.O.T.), which allows accepted students who have completed two year associate degrees at an Oregon community college to transfer into the university at junior level.

=== Colleges and schools ===
Portland State University's academic programs are organized into nine major academic units:

- College of Liberal Arts and Sciences
- School of Business Administration
- College of Education
- OHSU-PSU School of Public Health
- Maseeh College of Engineering and Computer Science
- College of the Arts
- School of Social Work
- College of Urban and Public Affairs
- University Honors College

In addition, Portland State University, through the Center for Executive and Professional Education, offers non-credit, short term, professional education programs for the public as well as customized education for organizations.

=== Undergraduate curriculum ===
==== University Studies ====
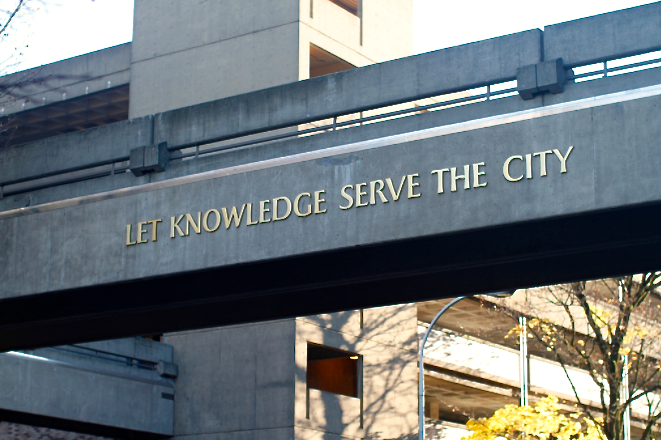
The university's motto on a campus skybridge over SW Broadway St.

In 1993, PSU comprehensively reformed its undergraduate curriculum with a new curriculum called University Studies that is unique to the institution. The curriculum was conceived to address issues of credit distribution which required students in upper-level courses to enroll in classes outside of their majors. In a 1993 summary report on the reform, it was stated that the University Studies sought to incorporate "'across-the-curriculum' themes including writing, diversity and multiculturalism, ethics, and global studies," as well as form a foundation that "includes the capacity and the propensity to engage in inquiry and critical thinking, to use various forms of communication for learning and expression, to gain an awareness of the broader human experience and its environment, and appreciate the responsibilities of persons to themselves, to each other, and to community."

PSU's University Studies curriculum begins with Freshman Inquiry courses, which are interactive and theme-based, and "explore topics and issues using an interdisciplinary approach to show how they can be understood from different perspectives."

The Sophomore Inquiry courses are heavily communication-based, and are focused on group dialogue as well as presentations and research projects.

As students transition into junior level, they are required to enroll in Upper Division Cluster Courses which are more in-depth and focused, as they pertain more closely to the students' chosen majors. Unlike the inquiry courses that make up students' freshmen and sophomore years, the upper-division courses do not feature mentor sessions. The "clusters" from which students choose their courses cover a wide range of disciplines and themes.

During their senior year, while still completing upper-division Cluster Courses, students are also required to complete a six-credit senior capstone project in order to graduate. The capstone integrates class work with community-based work. These projects are integrated with local community organizations, and cover a wide range of issues, from social justice to grantwriting, environmental conservation, youth education, and more. Capstone courses often conclude with a public presentation from the students on their experiences with the community organization or cause which they explored.

The university received national recognition for the program from the U.S. News & World Report, the W.K. Kellogg Foundation, the Corporation for National Service, the Atlantic Foundation, and the Pew Charitable Trust for the innovative pedagogical approach to undergraduate education.

== Research ==
Portland State University is classified among "R2: Doctoral Universities – High research activity" by the Carnegie Classification of Institutions of Higher Education, reflecting levels of research expenditures and doctoral production reported through the National Science Foundation's Higher Education Research and Development (HERD) Survey.

In 2025, the Oregon Legislature designated Portland State University as Oregon's Urban Research University, formally recognizing its role as the state's primary public research institution embedded in a major metropolitan center.

Research at PSU emphasizes applied, interdisciplinary, and community‑engaged scholarship, with particular attention to urban systems, sustainability, public policy, and workforce development. Faculty research is frequently conducted in partnership with local, state, federal, and nonprofit organizations throughout the Portland metropolitan region, reflecting the university's urban mission.

Several academic units account for a significant share of the university's research activity. The School of Social Work is nationally recognized and ranked among the top social work programs in the United States, and its affiliated research centers — including the Regional Research Institute and the Center for Improvement of Child and Family Services — together account for approximately one‑fifth of the university's externally funded research, with an average annual research budget of about $11 million.

Research in the Maseeh College of Engineering and Computer Science emphasizes applied and interdisciplinary work in areas such as infrastructure, transportation, environmental systems, computing, and resilience in urban environments. The School of Business conducts applied research in fields including organizational behavior, real estate, supply chains, and sustainable organizations, often in collaboration with regional industry partners.

=== Rankings ===
Academic rankings

National
- Forbes: 290
- U.S. News & World Report: 259 (tie)
- Washington Monthly: 124
- WSJ/College Pulse: 401-500

Global
- ARWU: 801-900
- QS: 1201-1400
- THE: 801-1000
- U.S. News & World Report: 1171 (tie)

National Program Rankings
Program	Ranking
Education	108
Biological Sciences	175
Fine Arts	98
Health Care Management	47
Physics	146
Psychology	211
Public Affairs	52
Rehabilitation Counseling	18
Social Work	38
Sociology	96
Speech-Language Pathology	69

U.S. News & World Report ranked Portland State as a second tier research university in their 2017 report, but listed it as unranked nationally. The university is ranked among The Best 376 Colleges in its 2012 edition, "Best in the West", and as a "College With a Conscience" by The Princeton Review. Portland State's MBA (Master's of Business Administration) was ranked in the top 100 by The Princeton Review, who also named Portland State as one of the best institutions in the country for undergraduate education. In 2015, the university ranked at number 16 as one of the "Most Innovative" colleges in the nation.

In 2024, Washington Monthly ranked Portland State124th among 438 national universities in the U.S. based on Portland State's contribution to the public good, as measured by social mobility, research, and promoting public service.

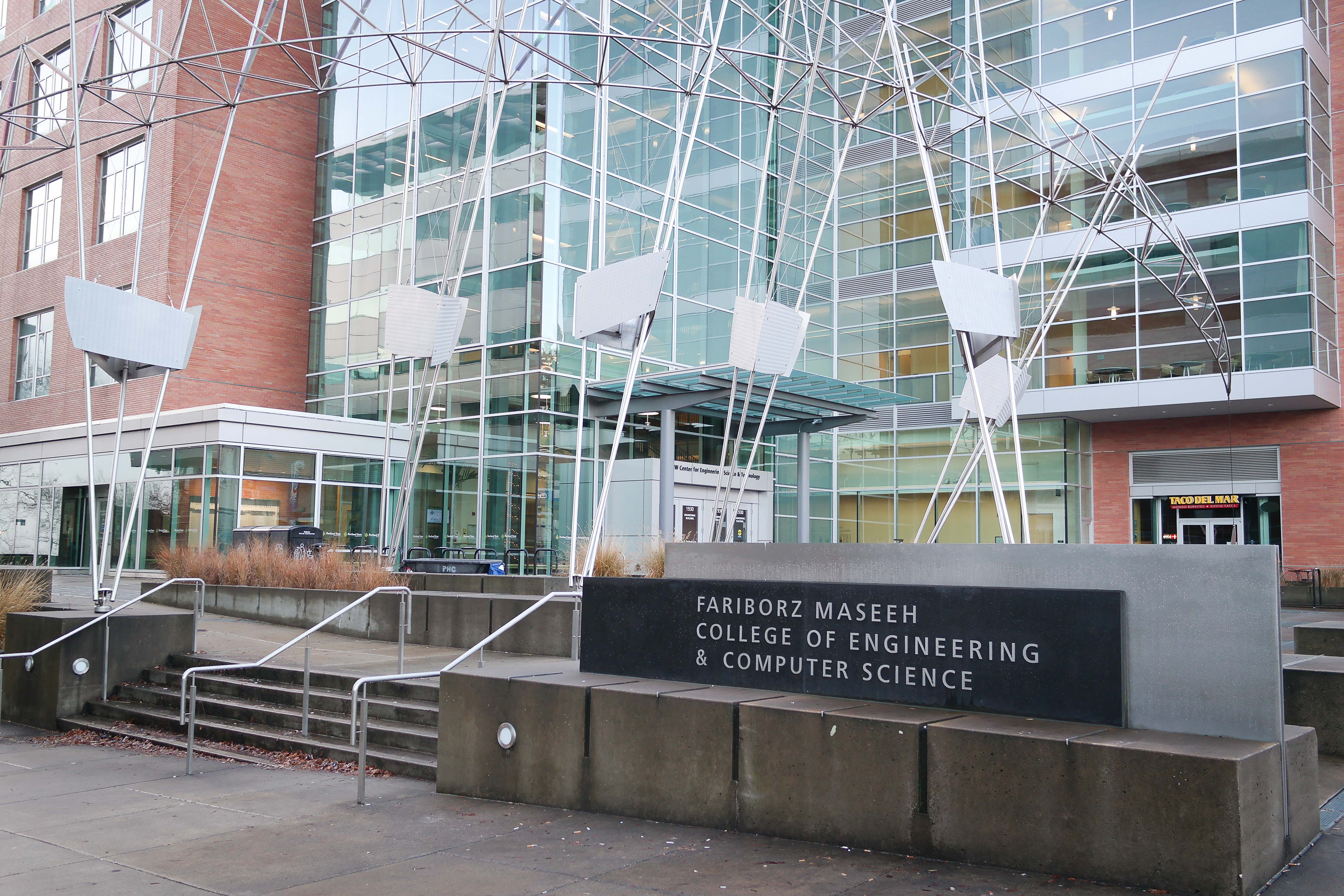
Fariborz Maseeh College of Engineering and Computer Science

Portland State University's School of Business Administration is also ranked in surveys, such as The Princeton Review's Best 294 Business Schools. U.S. News & World Report currently ranks Portland State University's graduate Urban & Regional Planning Program as the 14th best in the Nation. Planetizen currently ranks the university's graduate Urban & Regional Planning Program, at the Nohad A. Toulan School of Urban Studies and Planning, within the top 25 best urban planning programs in the nation.

Other top programs/colleges at Portland State University include its graduate College of Urban and Public Affairs which is ranked 46th in the nation, its Rehabilitation Counseling and Social Work graduate degrees ranked 23rd and 33rd respectively, its Speech-Language Pathology program is ranked 62nd, as well as its Graduate School of Education is ranked as being among the "Best" by U.S. News & World Report. The university is listed by U.S. News & World Report as having one of The Best Undergraduate Engineering Programs. The Carnegie Foundation ranked PSU as a Top School in Curricular Engagement, Outreach, and Partnerships, and it is ranked as the ninth Best Neighbor Universities.

== Campus ==
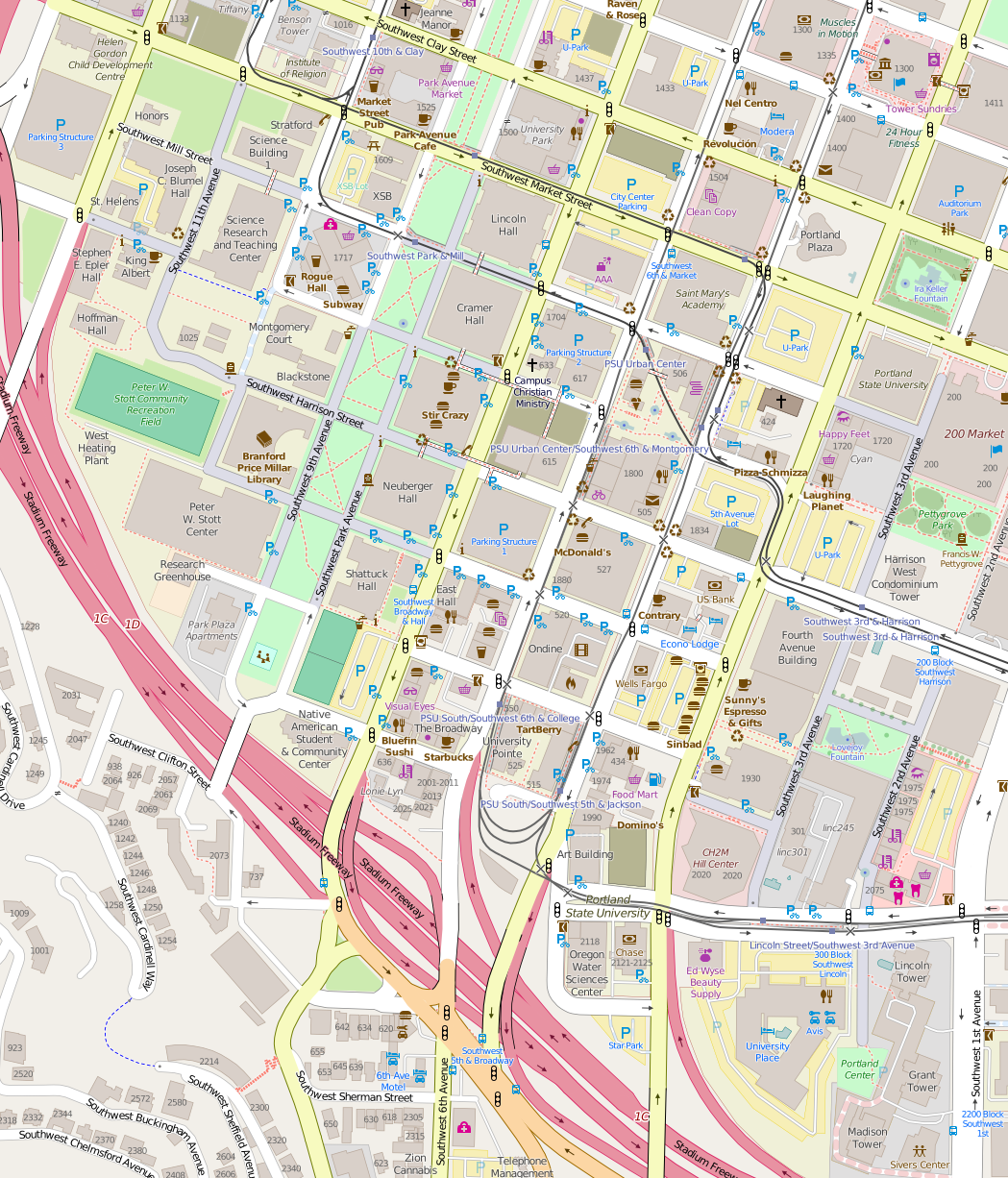
Campus map

The majority of the PSU campus is located across a 50-acre (20 ha) section of southwest downtown Portland, in an area known as the University District. The campus is situated against the West Hills, and is bound by Clay Street to the north, Fourth Avenue to the east, Interstate 405 to the south, and 12th Avenue to the west. SW Broadway runs through the center of the campus, where the university's central buildings are located: Lincoln Hall, Cramer Hall, Smith Memorial Student Union, Fariborz Maseeh Hall, and Shattuck Hall; Cramer Hall, Smith Memorial, and Fariborz Maseeh Hall are connected by tunnels on the basement levels, as well as by skybridges on the upper levels, which allows students access between buildings without having to use street sidewalks.

The university's South Park Blocks, situated on the opposite side of the central buildings, run parallel to Park Avenue, and begin at Market Street where Lincoln Hall is located, and end at Shattuck Hall. The northern edge of the PSU campus is eight blocks away from Pioneer Courthouse Square, and four blocks from the Portland Art Museum. The Keller Auditorium is located at the northwestern edge of the campus, on 3rd Ave. and Clay St.

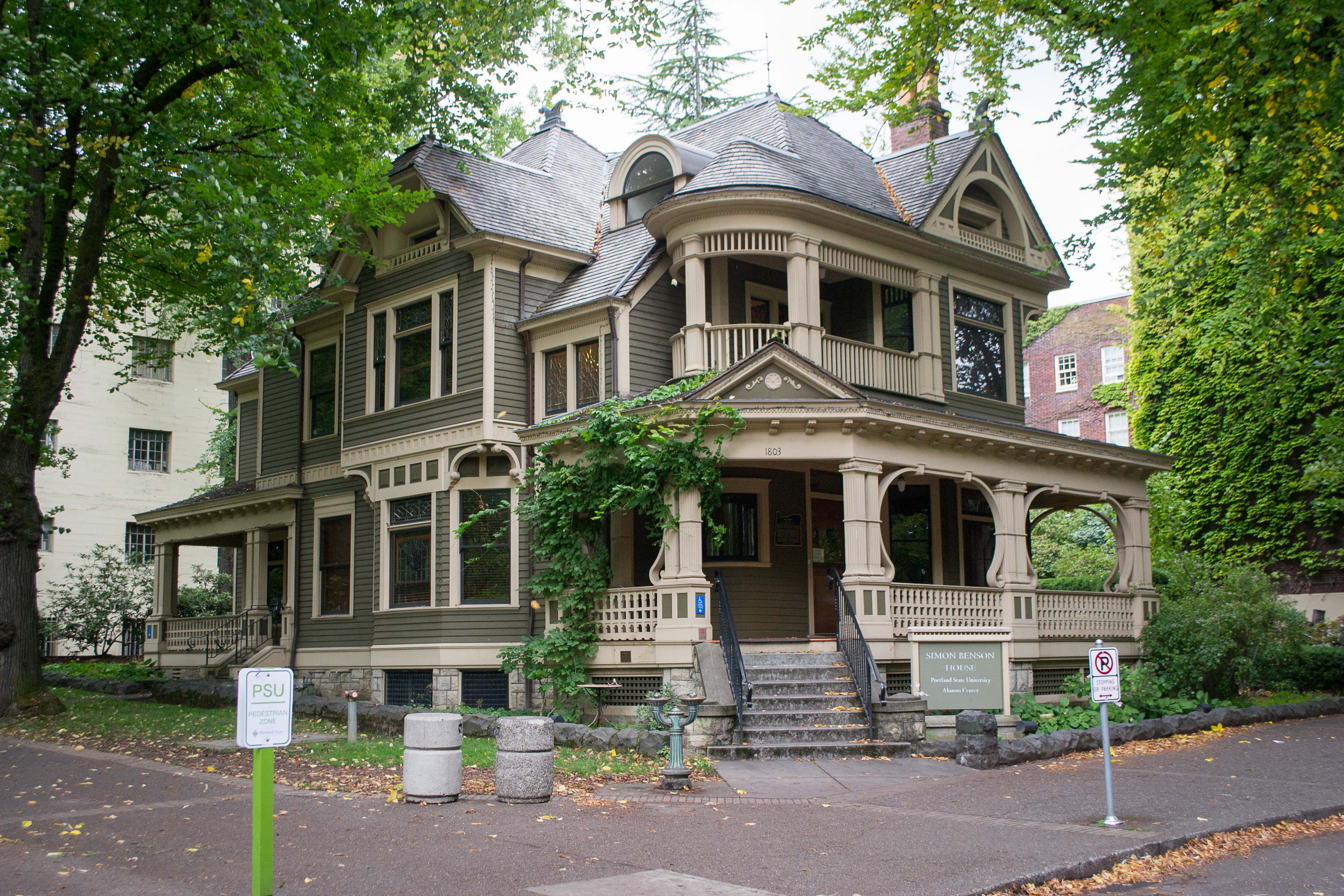
Simon Benson House, alumni and visitors' center

In 2010, the university opened a $62 million Gold LEED (Leadership in Energy and Environmental Design) Certified Student Rec Center. The six-story building houses an aquatics center, climbing wall, basketball/volleyball/badminton courts, an indoor soccer court, a large fitness area, and an outdoor program; it is located in the university's Urban Center, a quadrangle which is also home to the College of Urban and Public Affairs, the university bookstore, and several restaurants; the Portland Streetcar runs west through the center.

The student-managed PSU Film Committee operates the 5th Avenue Cinema, one of the only student operated theaters in the United States.

=== Residence halls ===
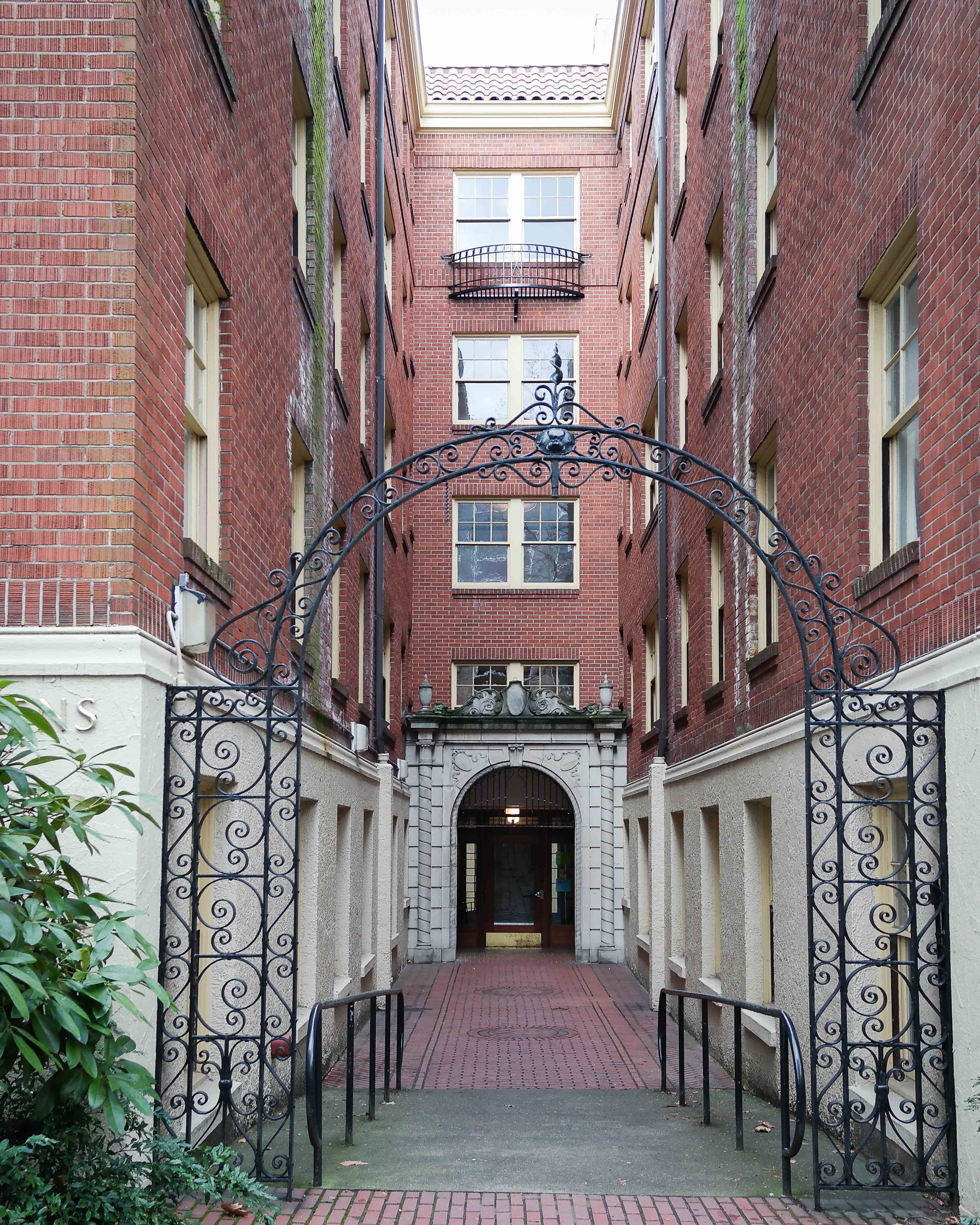
St. Helens Court, residence hall at Portland State University

PSU houses around 3,000 undergraduate and graduate students, and has ten residence halls. Its largest include University Pointe, a sixteen-story apartment building operated by American Campus Communities built in 2011, and Ondine, a fifteen-story high rise.

Older residence halls, many of which were originally apartment buildings that were purchased by the university, include Blackstone, built in 1930, and Montgomery Court, built in 1916. Other older residence halls include St. Helens Court, built in 1927; the art deco Parkway Manor, built in 1931; and Blumel Hall, built in 1986.

=== Greek system ===
There are several fraternities and sororities on campus. They are represented by a student-run group called "Greek Life."

=== Art and galleries ===
Portland State University has numerous pieces of public art around campus from renowned local, national and international artists, such as Frederic Littman, Thomas Hardy, Ken MacKintosh & Lillian Pitt, Emily Ginsburg, Harrell Fletcher with Avalon Kalin, Linda Stein, John Aiken, and Ed Carpenter. PSU is also home to the Jordan Schnitzer Museum of Art at Portland State University, with art donated by Jordan Schnitzer.

=== Sustainability ===
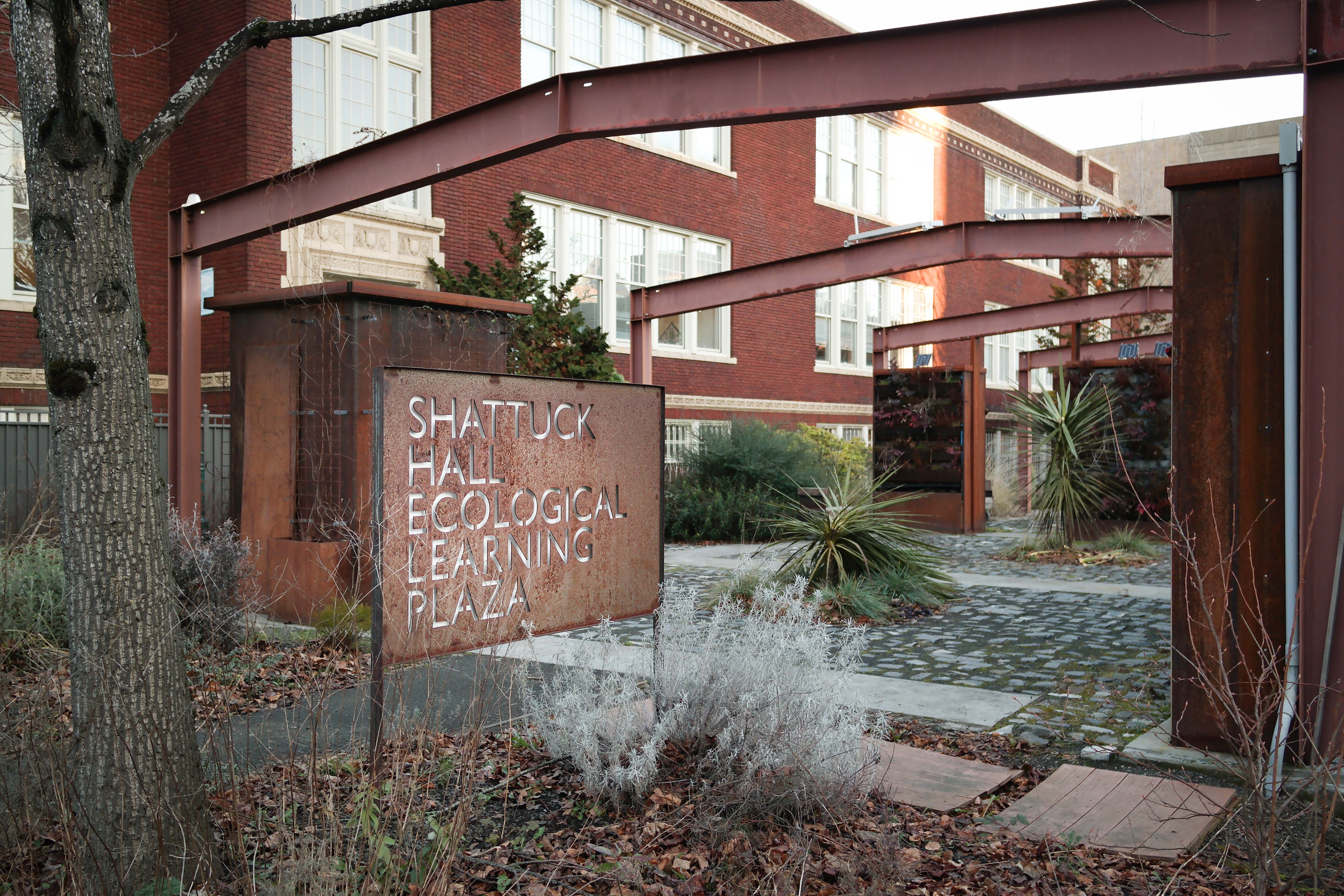
Shattuck Hall Ecological Learning Plaza

The university has made great efforts to make its buildings environmentally sustainable, both in its new architecture as well as through renovation of its older buildings. In September 2008 the James F. and Marion L. Miller Foundation awarded Portland State University a $25 million challenge grant. The grant and the funds raised to match it must be used exclusively for sustainability programs.

As of 2012, eight buildings on the PSU campus are LEED-certified, two of which are at Platinum status, and the university announced plans for renovations on Neuberger Hall to bring it to LEED certification as well in 2014. Portland State has been named among the most eco-friendly universities in the United States. In addition to the university's eco-conscious architecture and reconstructive work, it has also been recognized for its utilization of mass transit, including light rail, streetcar, and bus systems all central to the campus. It has also been recognized for its abundance of bicycle transportation; in 2013, PSU was ranked one of America's six most bike-friendly universities, third to Stanford University and University of California, Davis.

Outside Shattuck Hall, the university's architecture department constructed the Shattuck Hall Ecological Learning Plaza, a garden featuring green walls, solar panels, and permeable pavement.

== Student life ==
Undergraduate demographics as of Fall 2023
Race and ethnicity	Total
White	48%
Hispanic	23%
Asian	10%
Two or more races	8%
Black	5%
International student	2%
Unknown	2%
Native Hawaiian/Pacific Islander	1%
American Indian/Alaska Native	1%
Economic diversity
Low-income (Note: The percentage of students who received an income-based federal Pell grant intended for low-income students.)	46%
Affluent (Note: The percentage of students who are a part of the American middle class at the bare minimum.)	54%

=== Student body ===
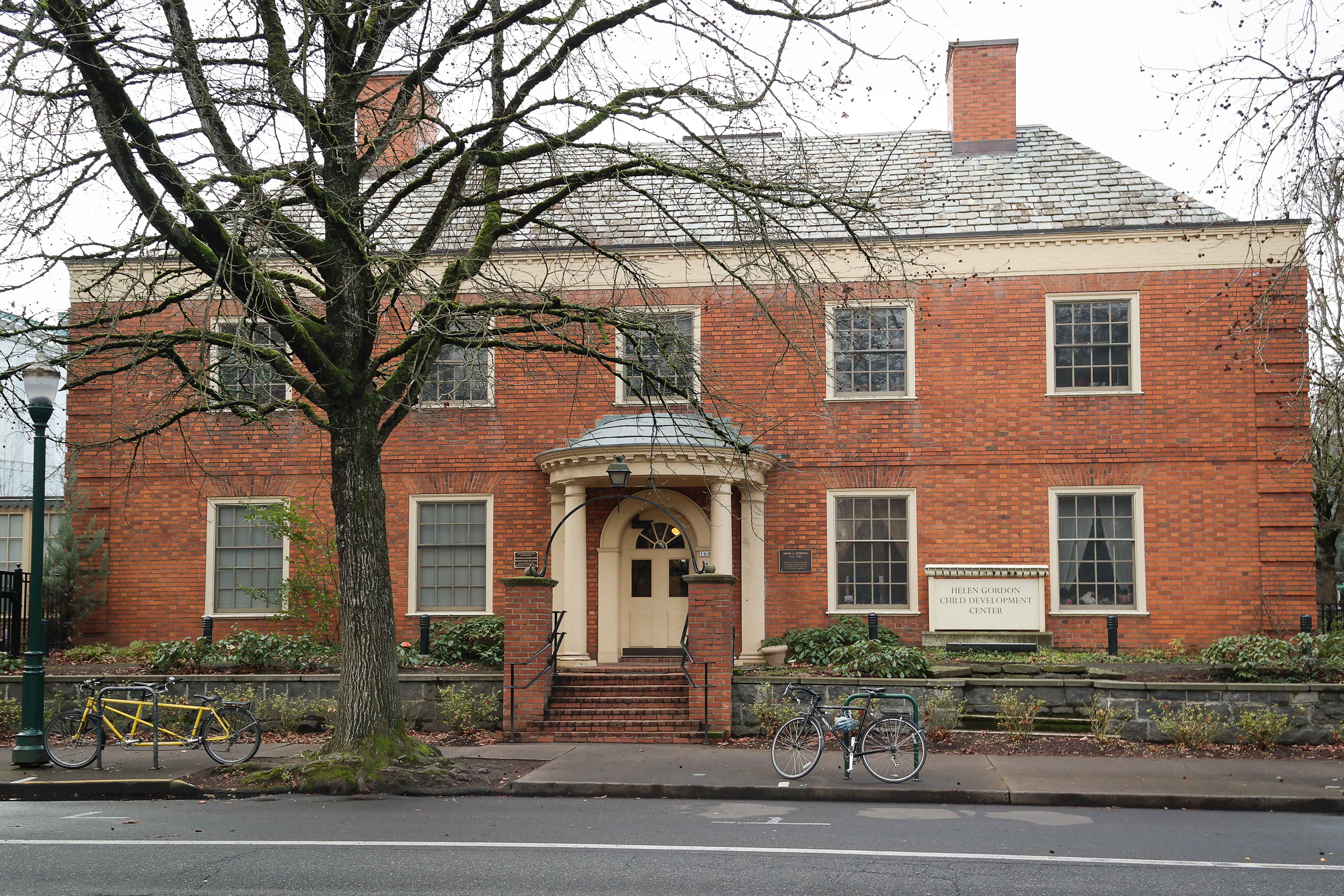
The Helen Gordon Child Development Center offers preschool for children of Portland State students and faculty.

Portland State differs from the other universities in Oregon partially because, as an urban institution, it attracts a student body older than other universities; in the 2010–2011 school year, it was reported that the average age of an attending undergraduate student was 26 years. Some programs only offer night classes. PSU also delayed the development of its campus for decades after its founding. The institution sold land in a neighboring block soon after its move to downtown Portland, and delayed the construction of student housing until the early 1970s.

The student government is the Associated Students of Portland State University (ASPSU). In addition to a student body President and Vice President, there is a Student Fee Committee, a 25-member Student Senate, and a Judicial Board which rules on ASPSU constitutional questions. There are also a number of university committees that have student members appointed by the ASPSU President. Portland State also participates in the Oregon Student Association, the statewide student lobbying non-profit.

=== Publications ===
The fully student-run newspaper at Portland State is the Portland State Vanguard, established in 1946. Student-run broadcasters run radio station KPSU which is ranked in the Top 20 College Radio Stations by several organizations and is one of only a handful of "Free Format" radio stations in the country, and television station PSU TV. The Portland Review is a literary magazine of poetry, fiction, and art published by PSU's Student Publications Board since 1956. Additional student newspapers at PSU were The Rearguard, a monthly newspaper, and The Spectrum. Following budget cuts for these publications, they were consolidated into a monthly magazine The Pacific Sentinel in January 2016.

=== Human resources ===
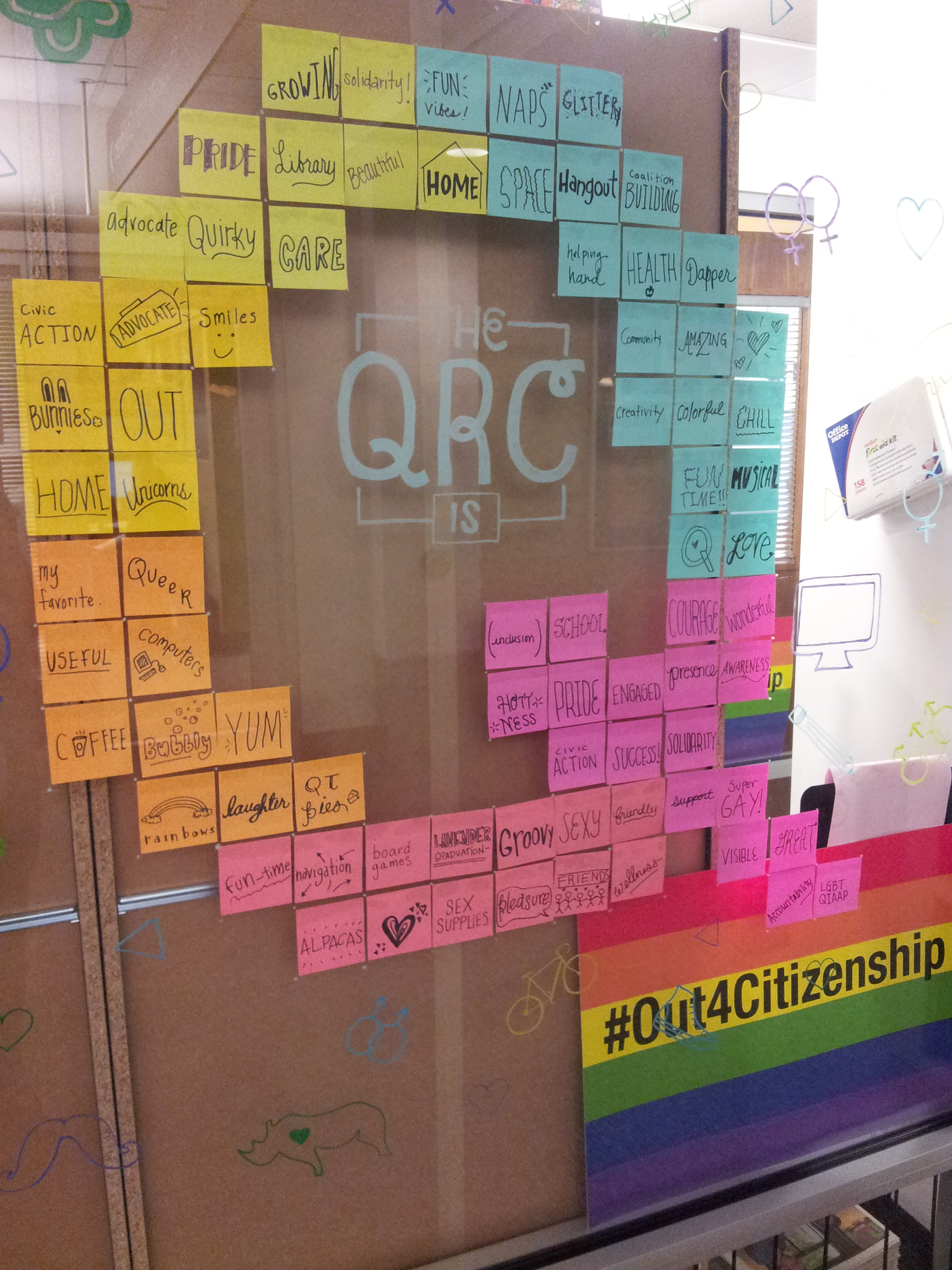
Campus Queer Resource Center

The university houses a Women's Resources center, a Disability Resources center, a Resource Center for Students with Children, a Queer Resource Center for LGBT students, and a Veteran's Resource Center.

=== Transportation ===
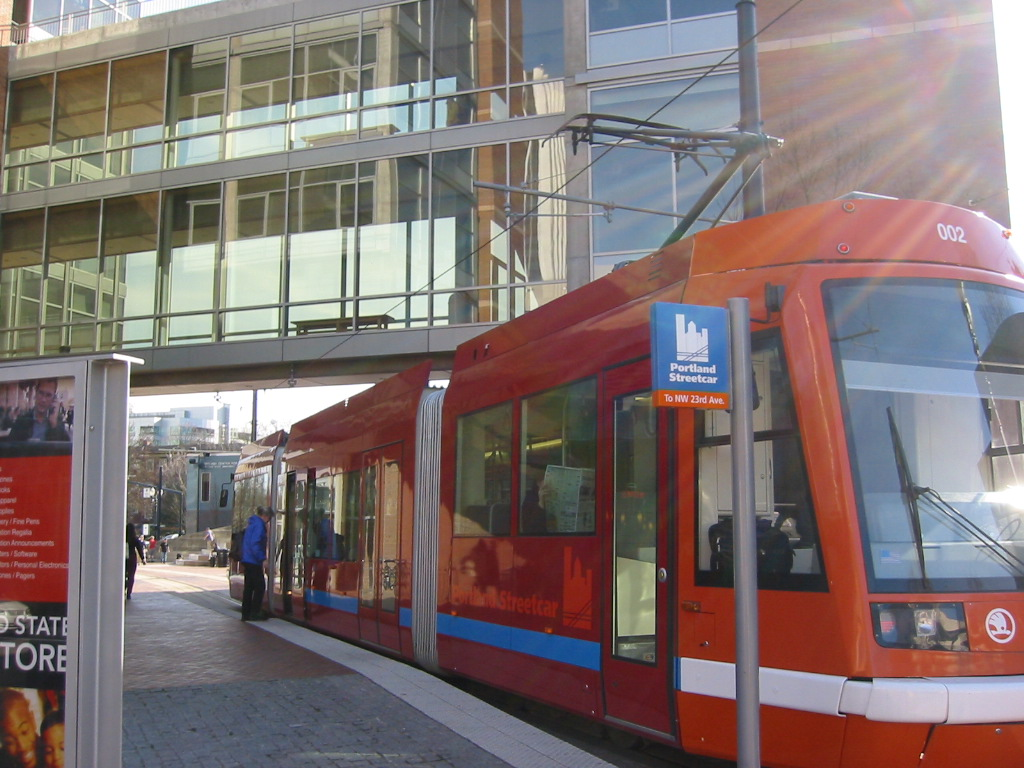
Portland Streetcar at the university's Urban Plaza

The university contains four parking structures for automobiles: two located on 6th Avenue; one on 12th Street at the northwestern edge of the campus; and one 5th Avenue between Montgomery and Harrison Streets. A guest parking lot is located on the south end of Shattuck Hall.

Portland State University is serviced with mass transit by TriMet, which includes fifteen bus lines as well as the MAX light rail system.

There are also shuttles available through Oregon Health & Science University and Portland Community College on SW Harrison Street at SW Broadway. In addition to use of mass transit, the university also has a large population of students who travel by bicycle.

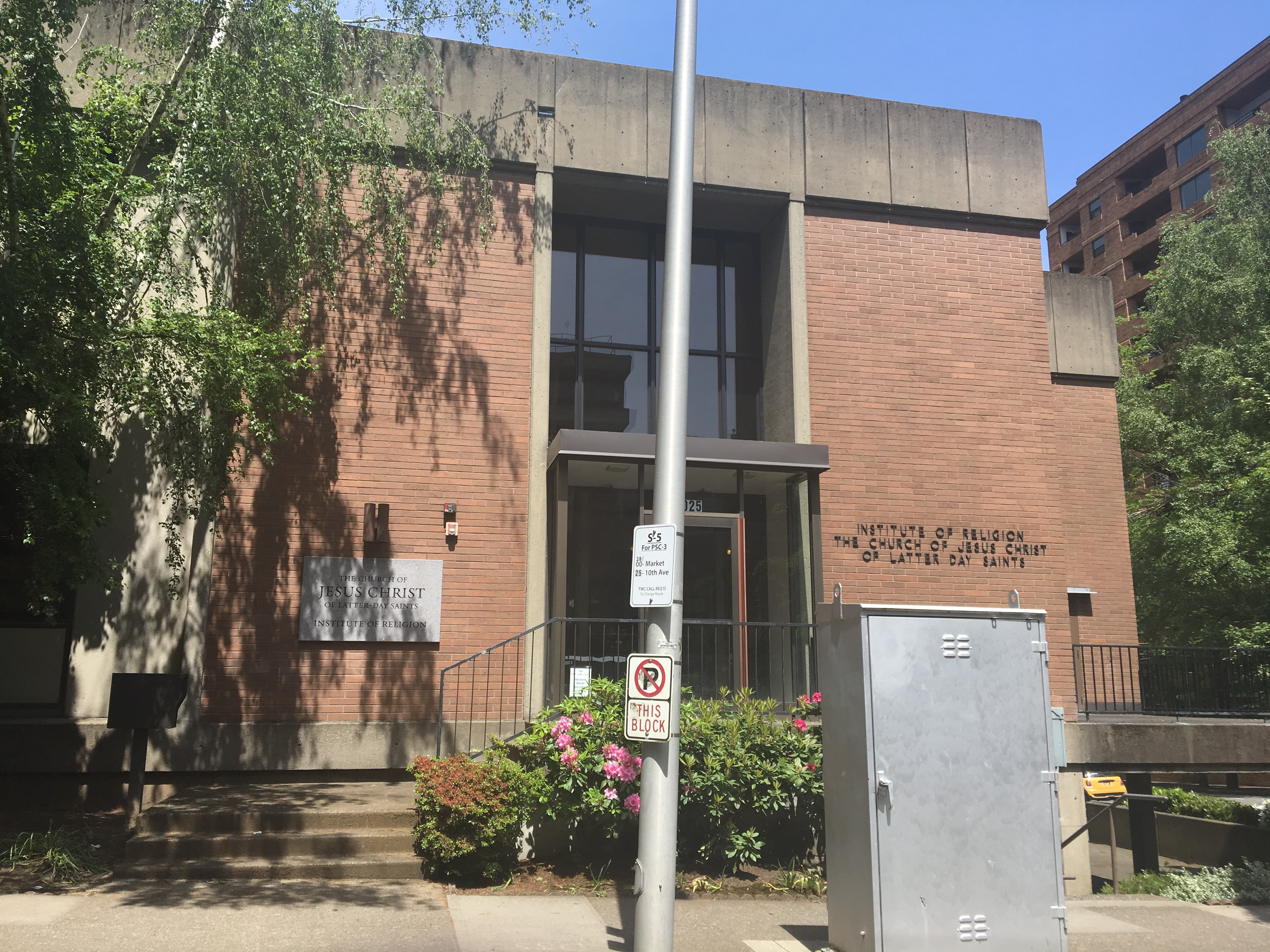
A Mormon Institute of Religion and church located on campus

=== Religious services ===
PSU's campus is home to two Christian churches.

St. Michael the Archangel Catholic Church is home to the Portland State Newman Center. The Church of Jesus Christ of Latter-day Saints operates an Institute of Religion which holds Sunday services.

Other clubs for Christian, Muslim, and Jewish students meet on campus.

== Athletics ==
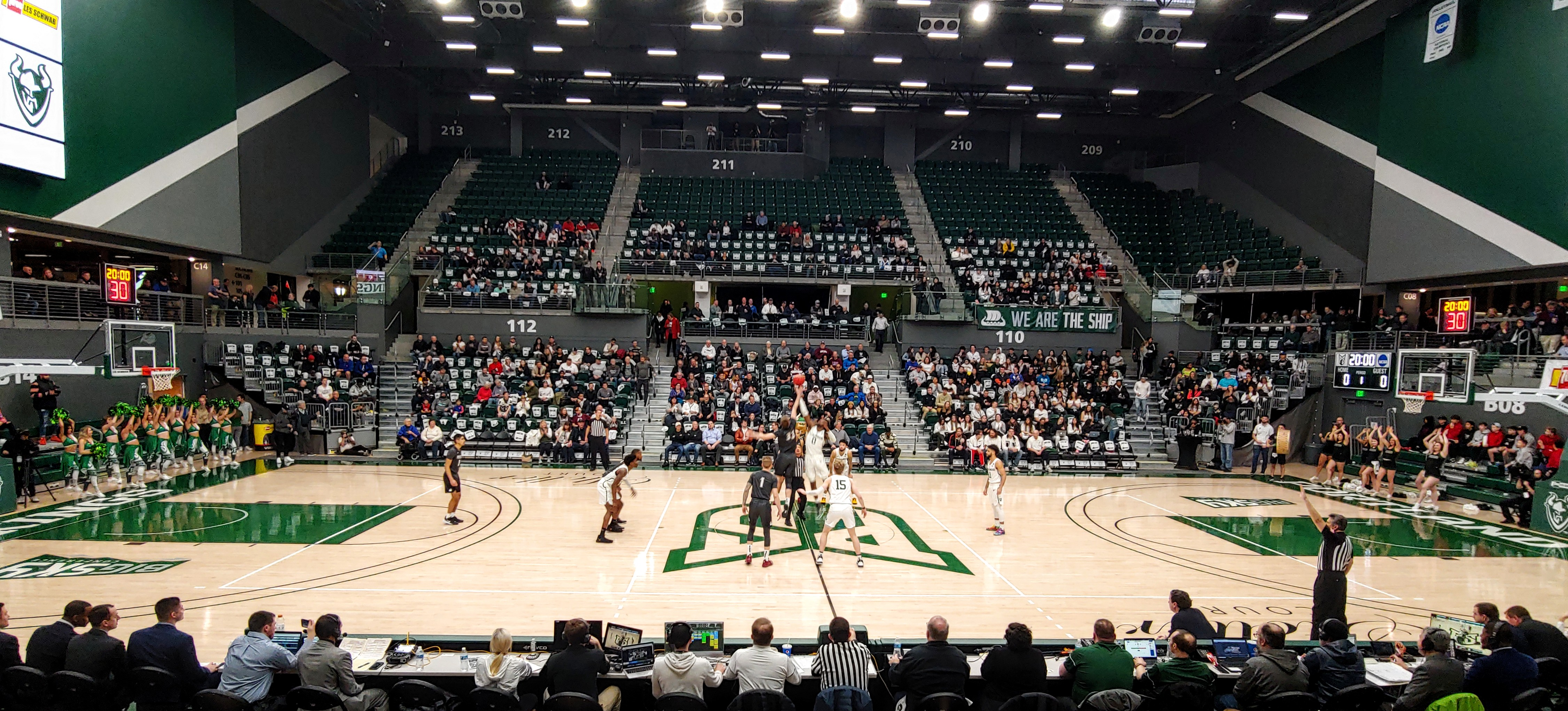
The Viking Pavilion is home to Vikings basketball and volleyball.

Portland State competes at the NCAA Division I level in football, basketball, women's volleyball, golf, soccer, tennis, softball, indoor and outdoor track and field, and cross country as a member of the Big Sky Conference. The football team competes in Division I FCS (Football Championship Subdivision).

Prior to joining Division I, the school won NCAA National Division II championships in women's volleyball and wrestling. The university has 30 student-managed club sports on campus including the PSU Rugby Club, the PSU Ice Hockey Club and the PSU Lacrosse Club. In addition, the Student Activities and Leadership Program sponsors 120 student clubs including the Tango, Fencing, Medieval and Brewers' clubs.

Portland State's colors are green and white, and its mascot is the Viking personified as "Victor E. Viking".

Home games for football are held off-campus at Hillsboro Stadium, and home games for basketball are held on-campus in the Viking Pavilion.

== Alumni and faculty ==
=== Notable alumni ===
Notable Portland State alumni:

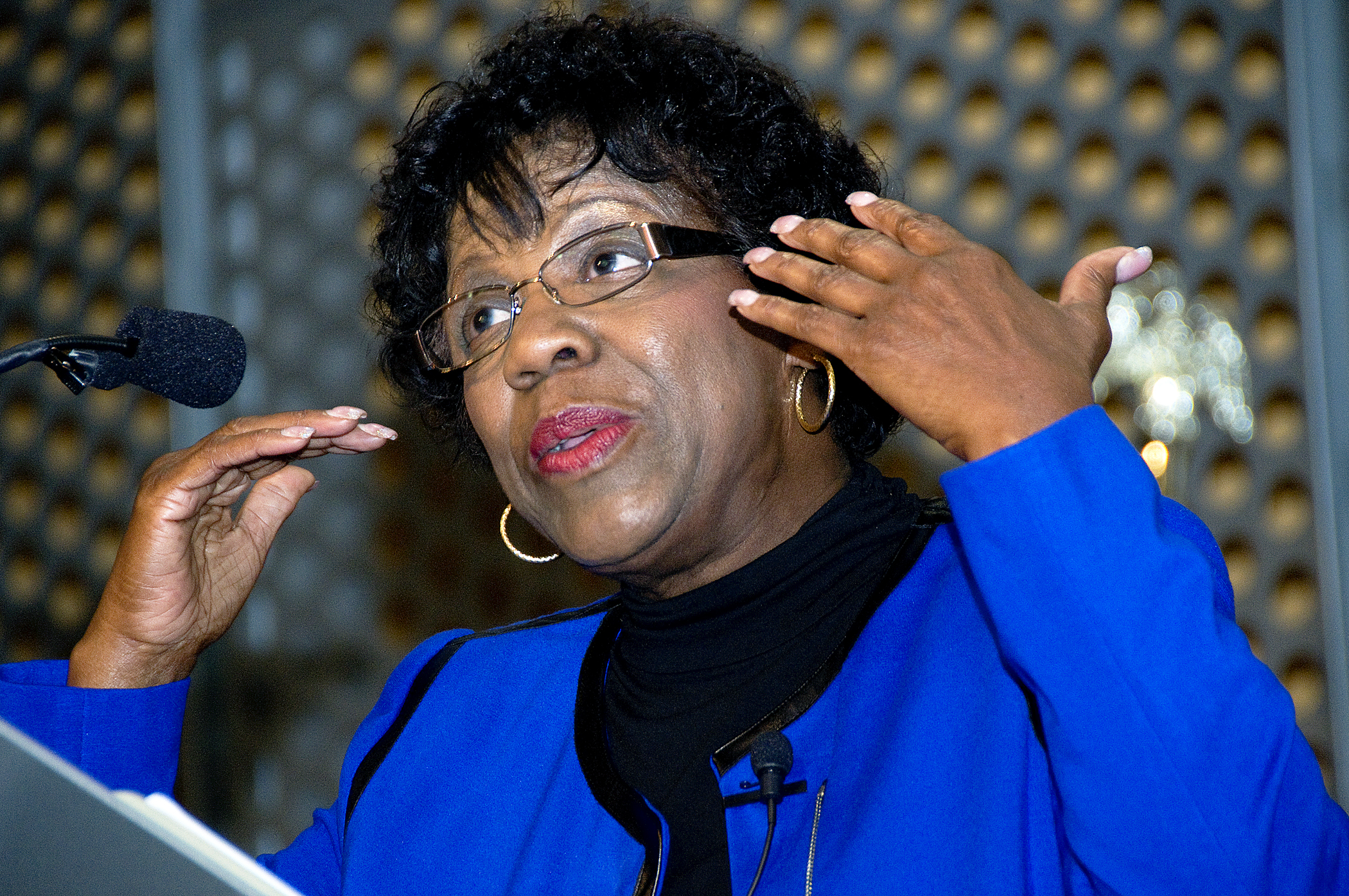
Margaret Carter, politician

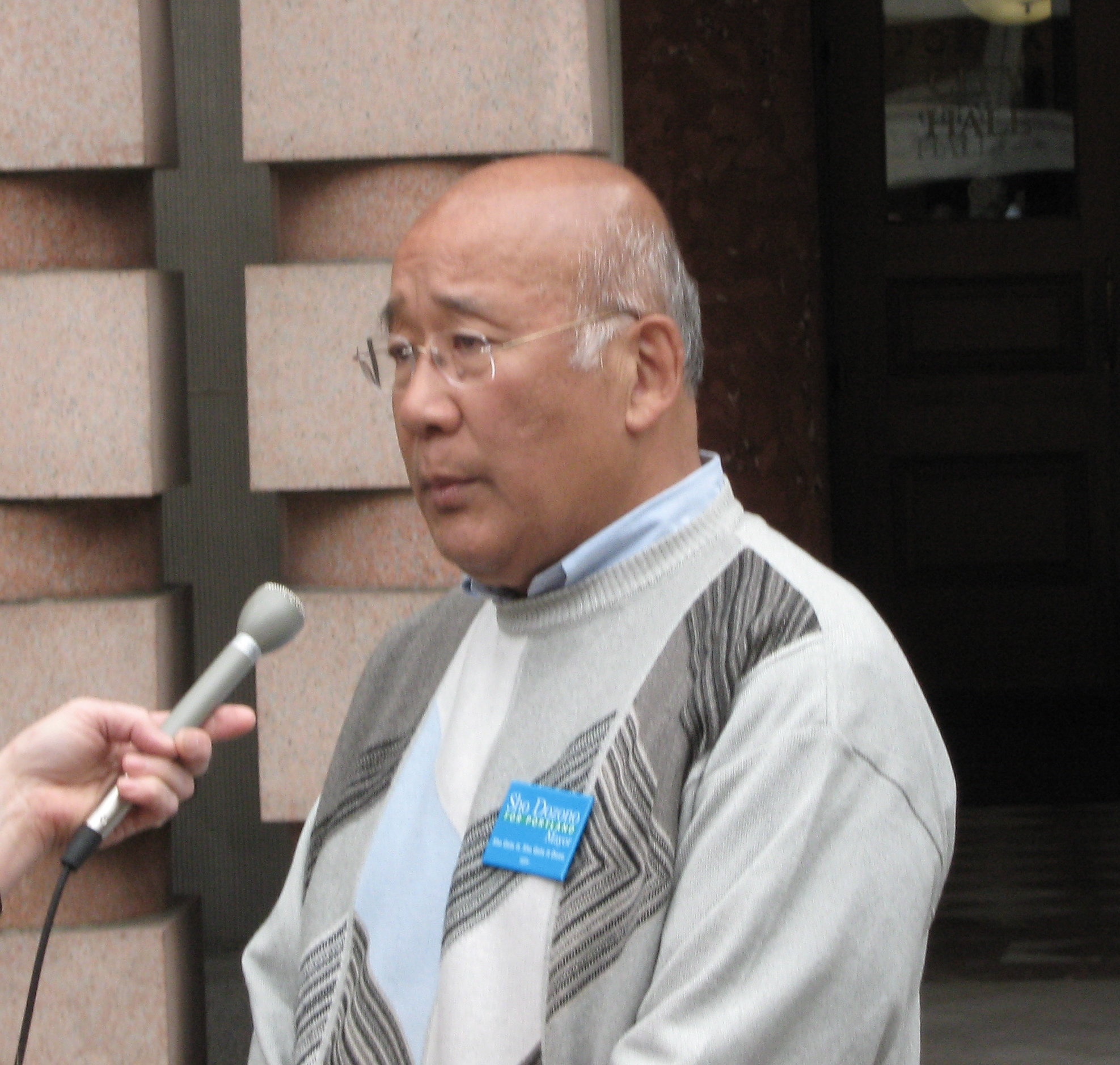
Sho Dozono, entrepreneur

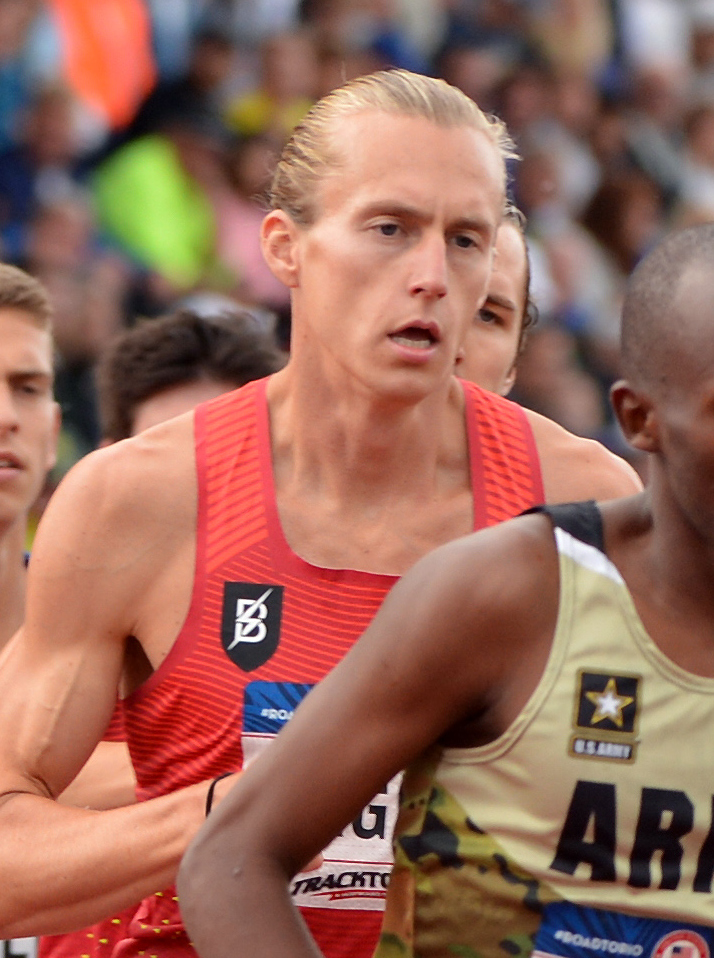
Evan Jager, distance runner

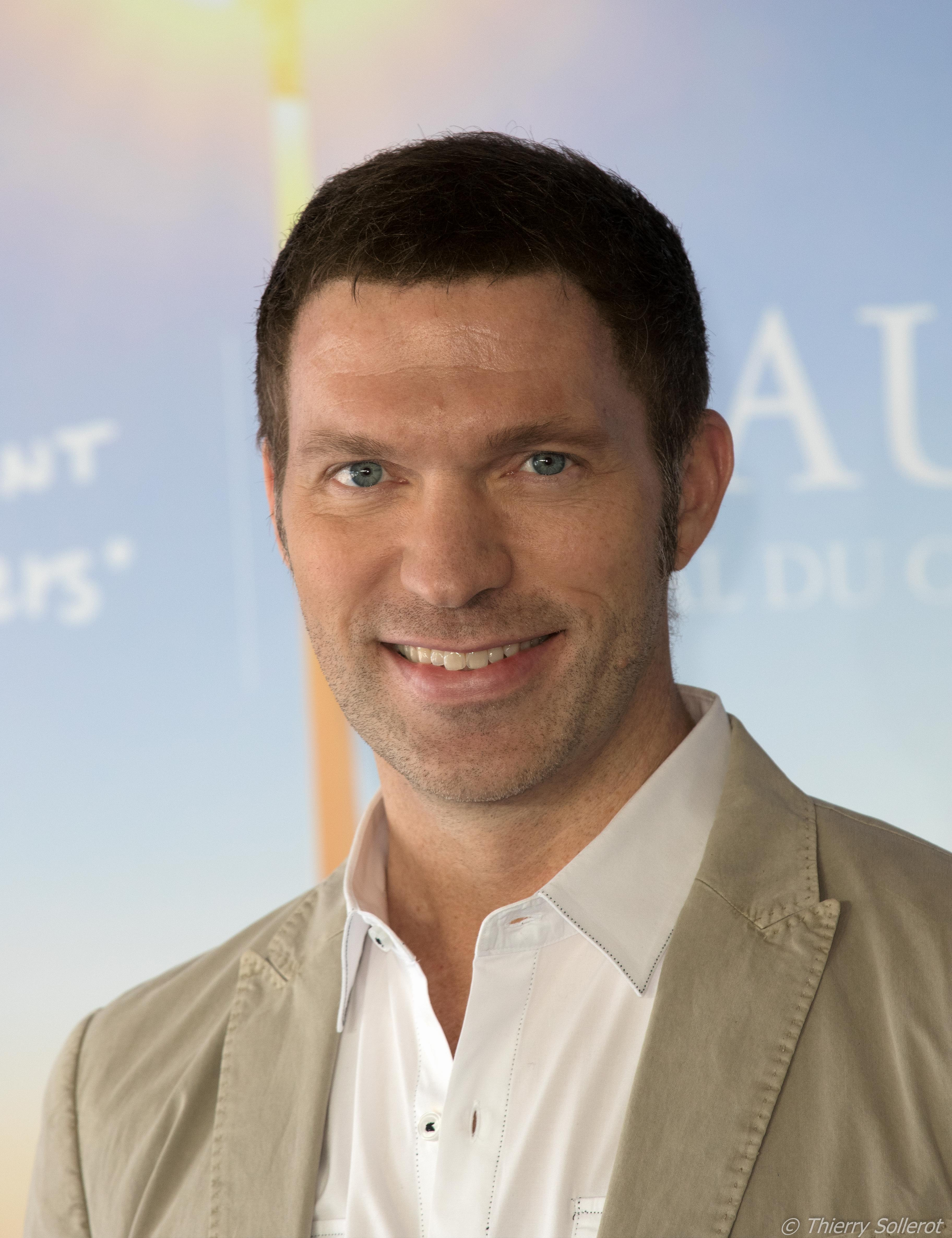
Travis Knight, animator; president and CEO of Laika

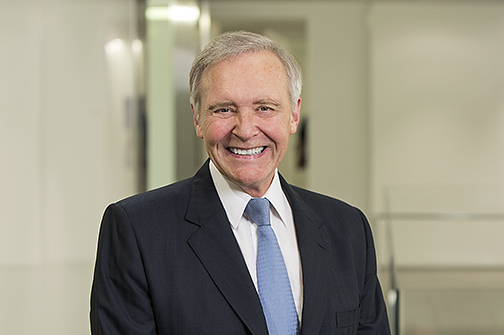
Joseph LeBaron, former ambassador to the State of Qatar

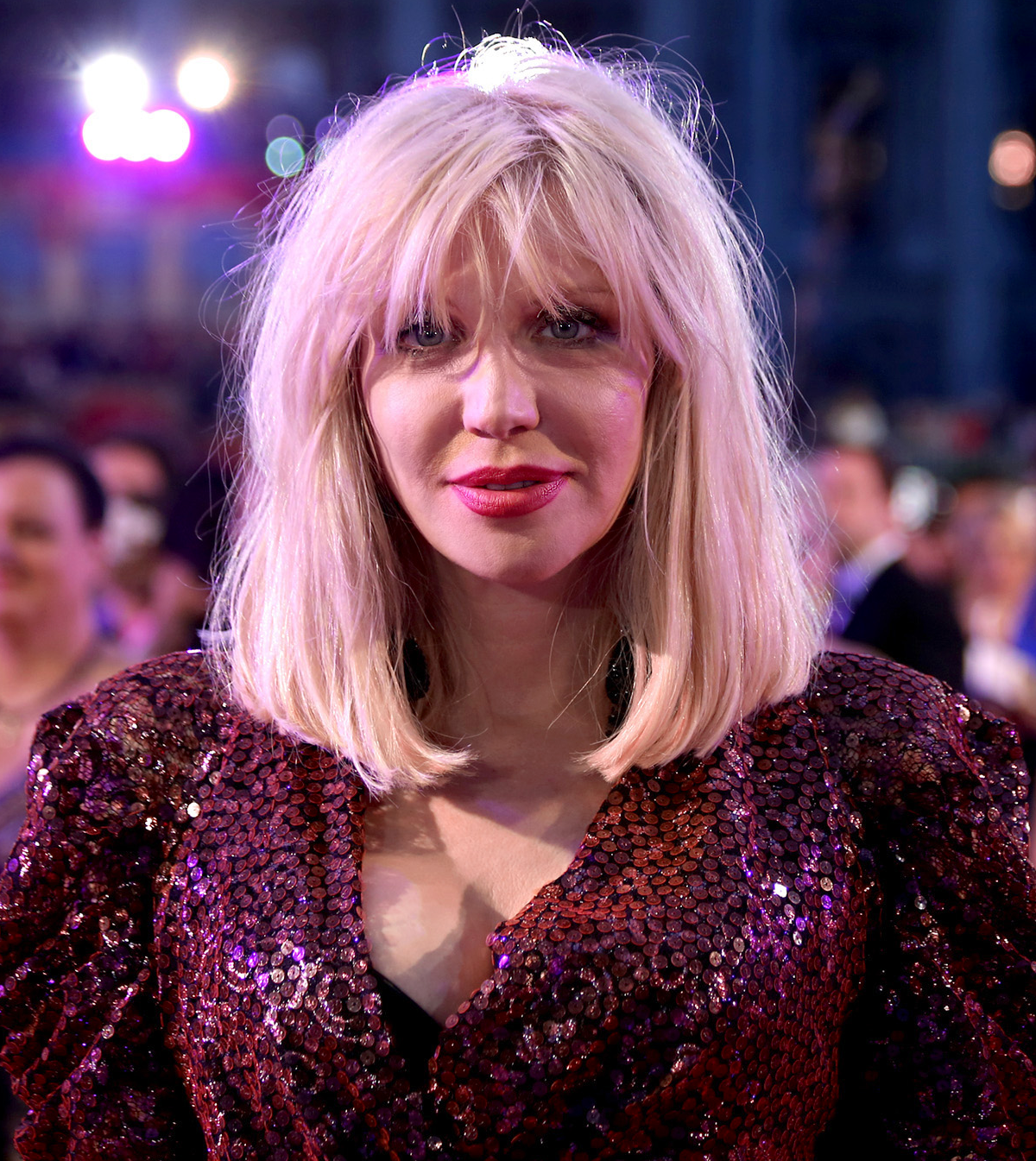
Courtney Love, singer and musician

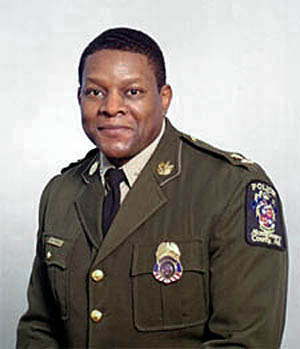
Charles Moose, police chief in charge of combating 2002 D.C. sniper attacks

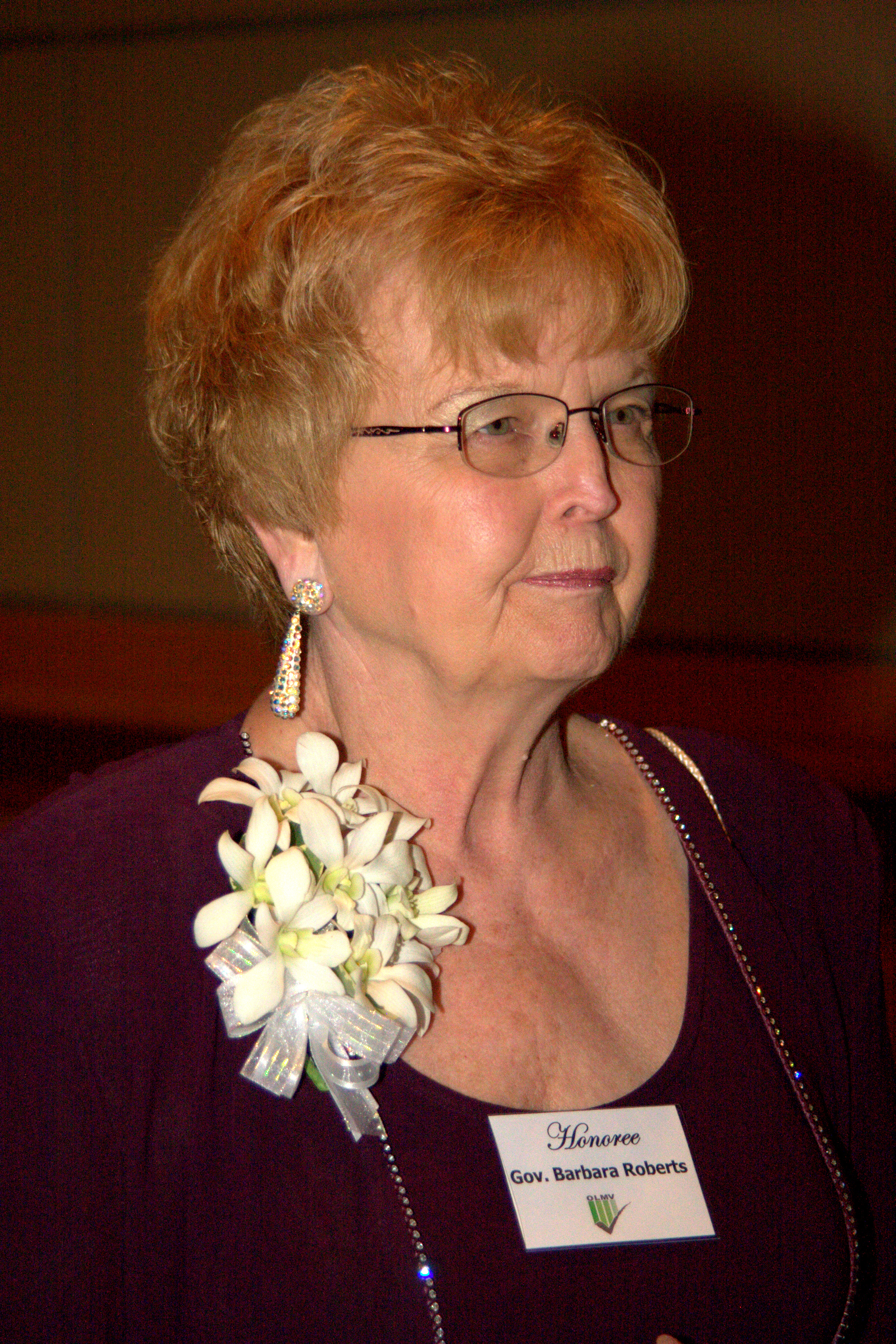
Barbara Roberts, 34th Governor of Oregon

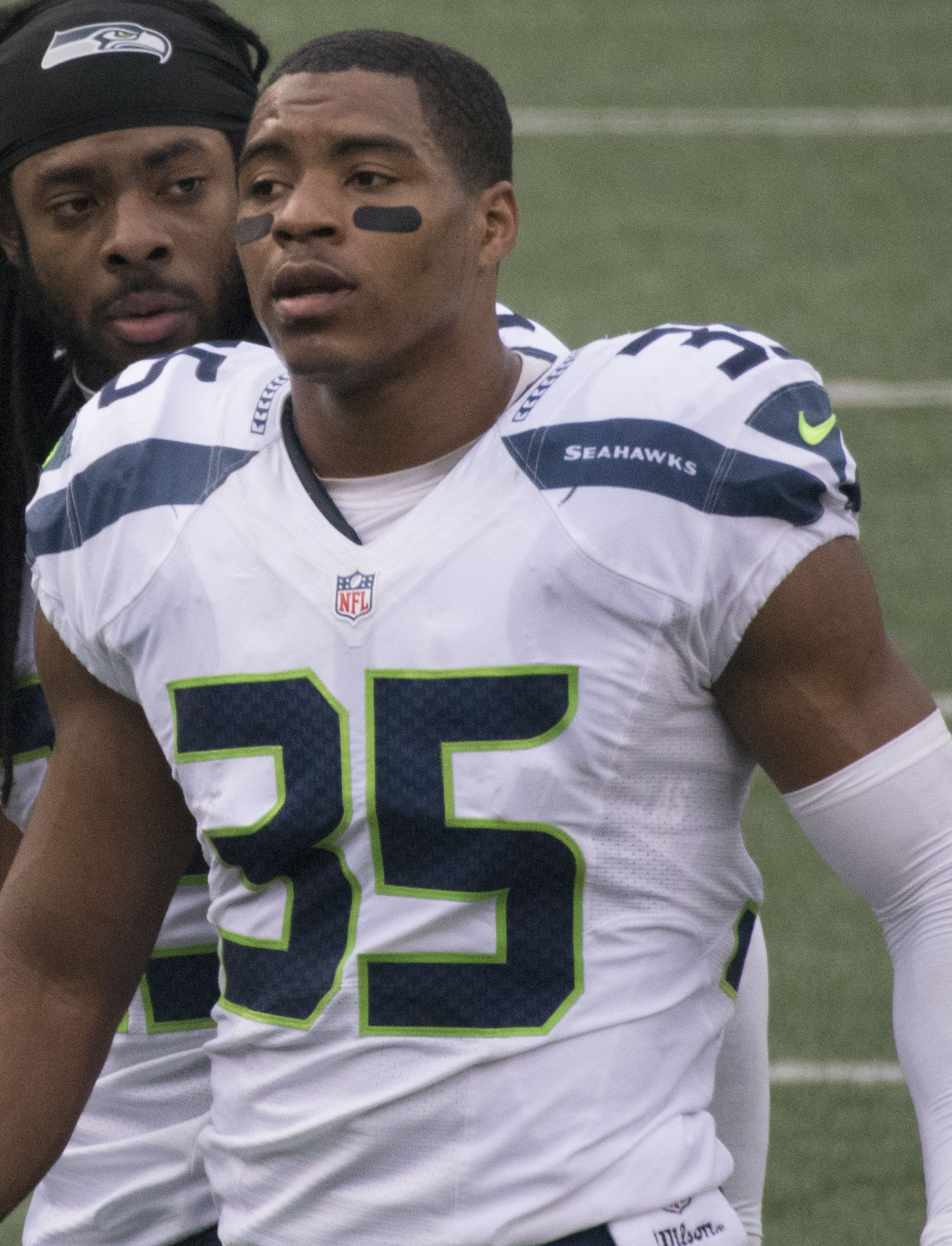
DeShawn Shead, NFL player (Seattle Seahawks)

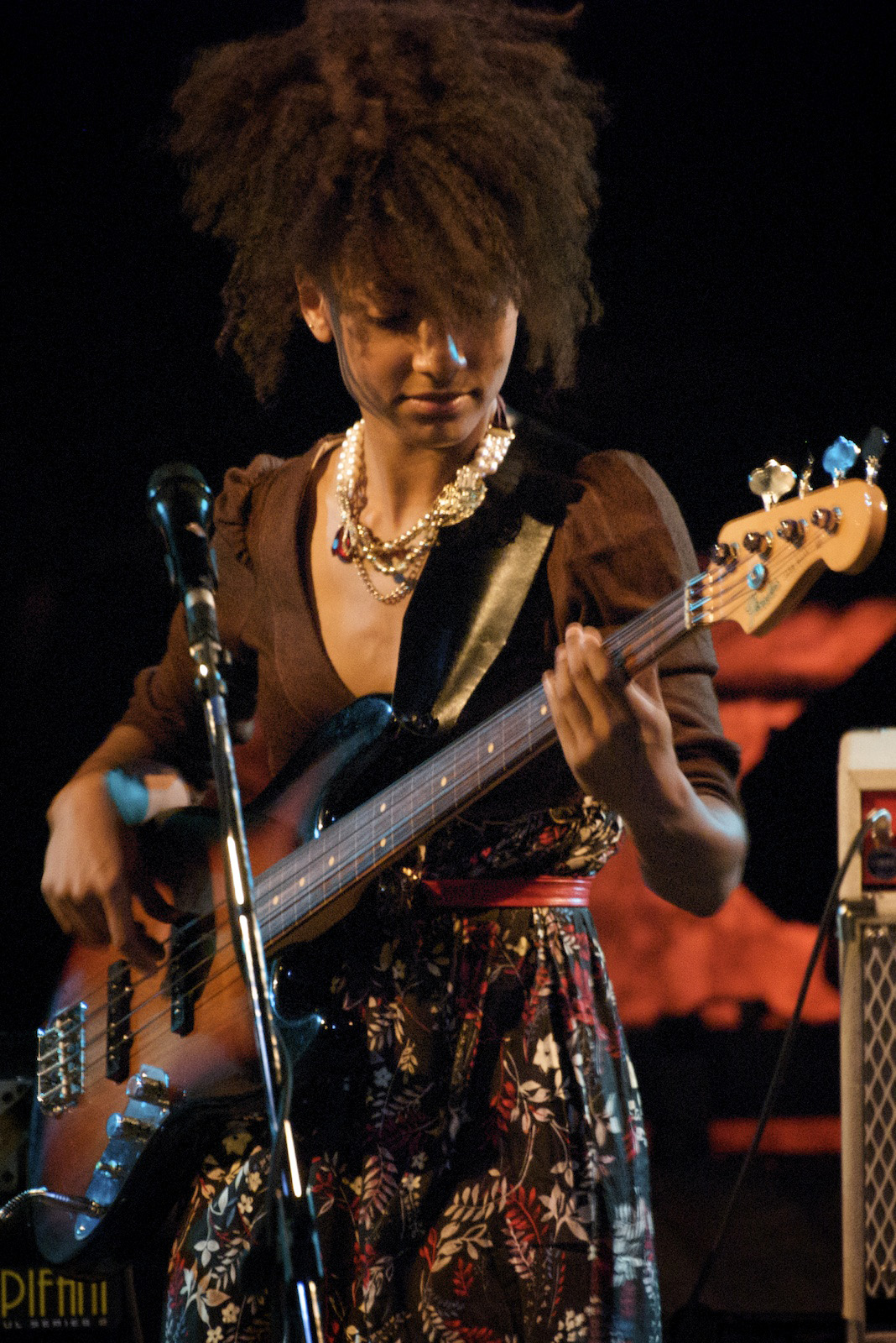
Esperanza Spalding, musician

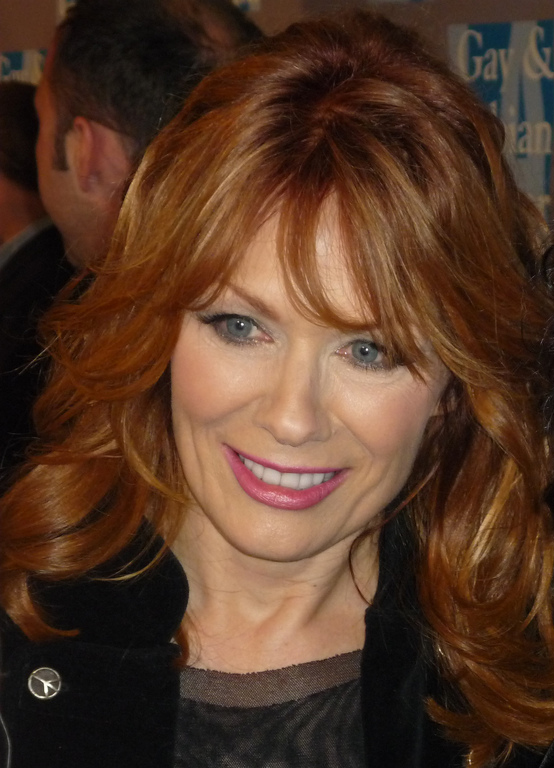
Nancy Wilson, singer and musician

=== Notable current and former faculty ===
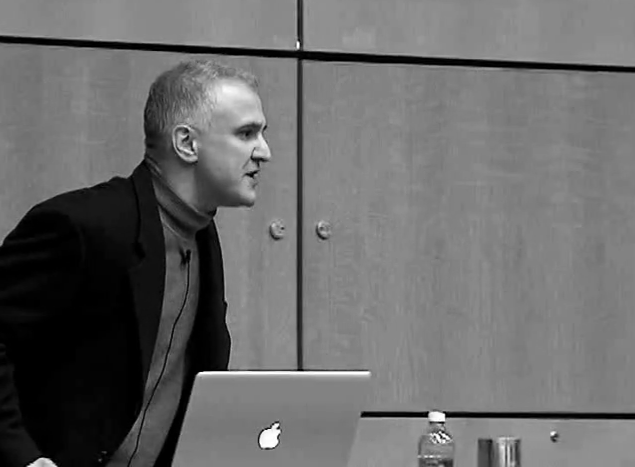
Peter Boghossian, professor of philosophy

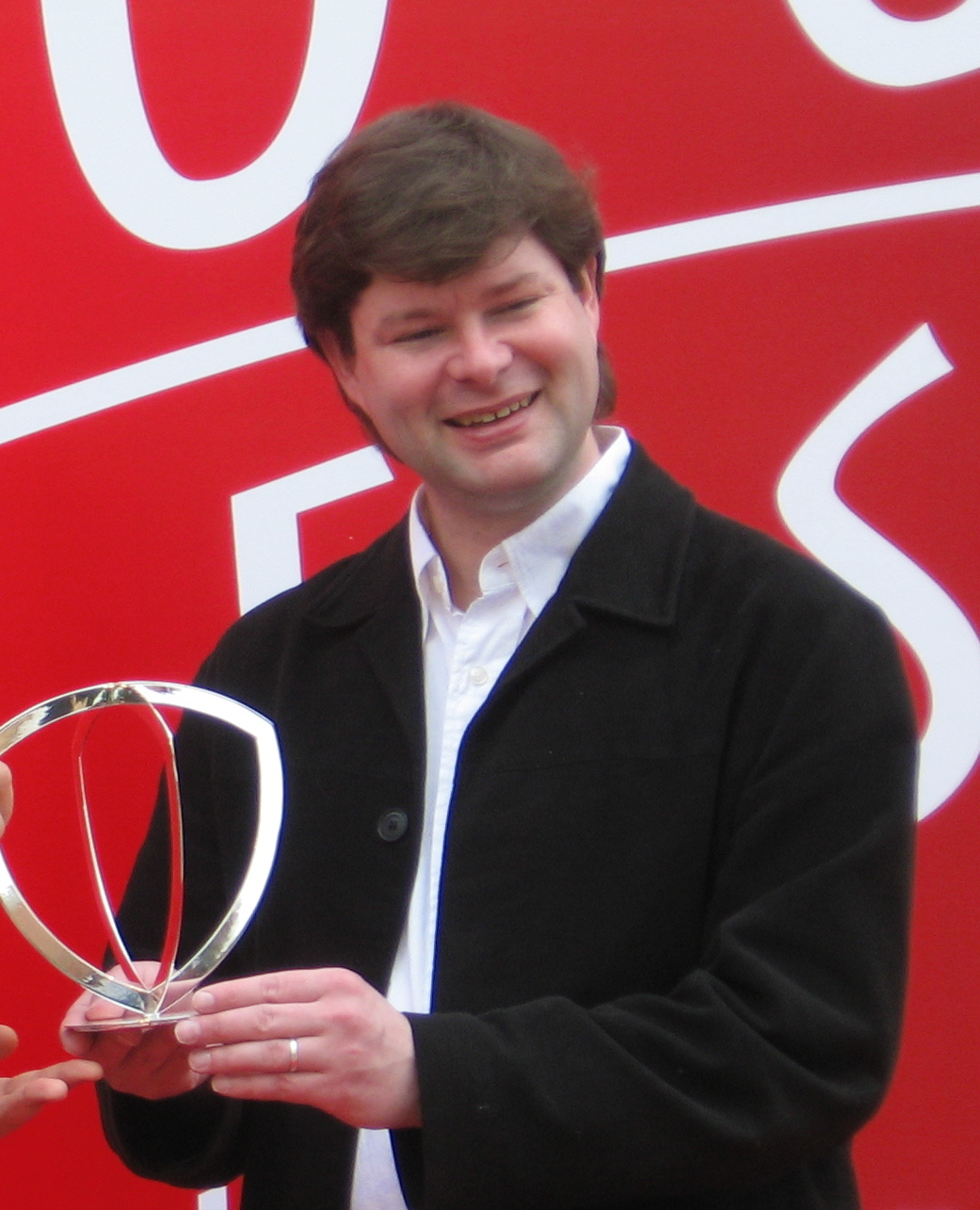
Paul Collins, writer and Guggenheim Fellow

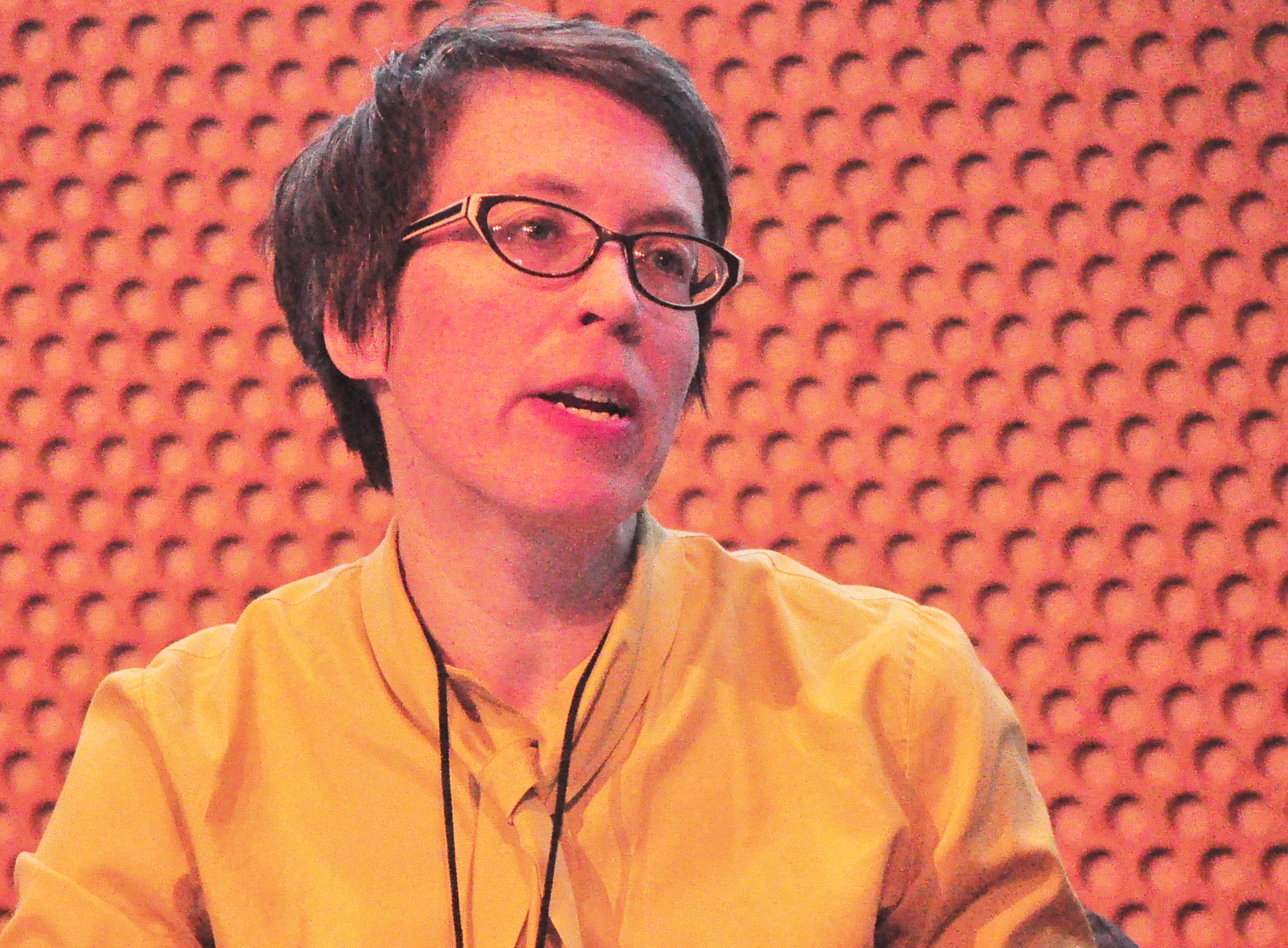
Sarah Dougher, musician and women's studies scholar

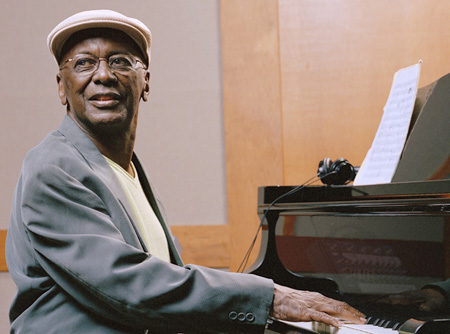
Andrew Hill, pianist and composer

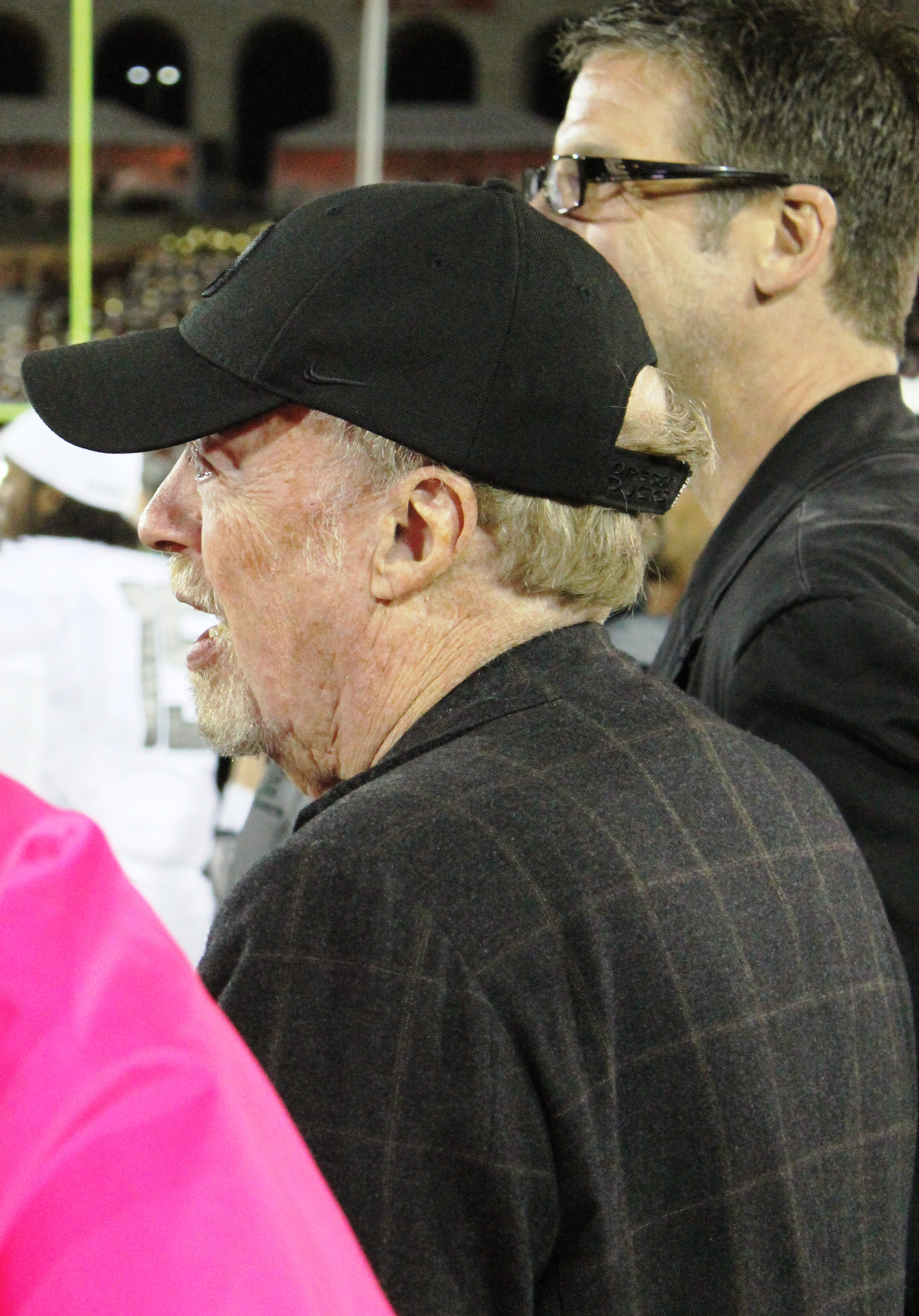
Phil Knight, co-founder of Nike

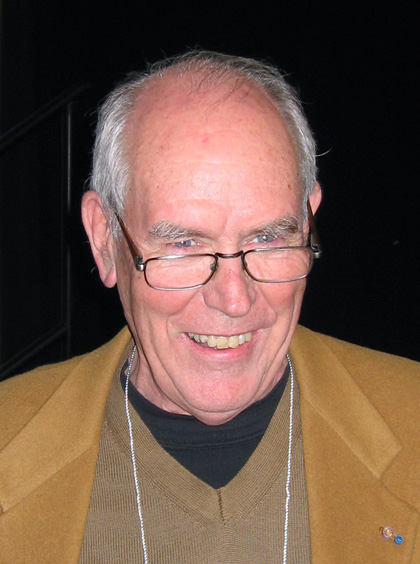
Ivan Sutherland, Turing Award-winning computer scientist
- Diana Abu-Jaber – professor of English and writer-in-residence
- Peter Boghossian – professor of philosophy
- Thom Bray – professor of television studies and screenwriting
- Johanna Brenner – professor emeritus of sociology and women's studies
- Paul Collins – writer, editor, Chair of English department
- Sarah Dougher – assistant professor of women, gender, and sexuality studies, musician
- Harrell Fletcher – professor of art and social practice
- Jan Haaken – professor emeritus of psychology, award-winning documentary filmmaker
- Robin Hahnel – professor of economics
- Rodney Hicks – professor of acting
- Andrew Hill – professor of music
- Marilyn Gayle Hoff - women's studies and women's literature (1973-1974)
- Phil Knight – former adjunct accounting professor, School of Business; co-founder and Chairman of Nike, Inc.
- David Maier – Maseeh professor of computer science, ACM Fellow
- Chet Orloff – professor of Urban Studies and Planning, director emeritus of Oregon Historical Society
- Sergio Palleroni – architect and co-founder of BASIC Initiative
- Gertrude F. Rempfer - Physicist and innovator in electron microscopy
- Ivan Sutherland – director, Asynchronous Research Center (ARC), Turing Award winner
- Leni Zumas – novelist and professor of English
