= John Virginius Bennes =

American architect

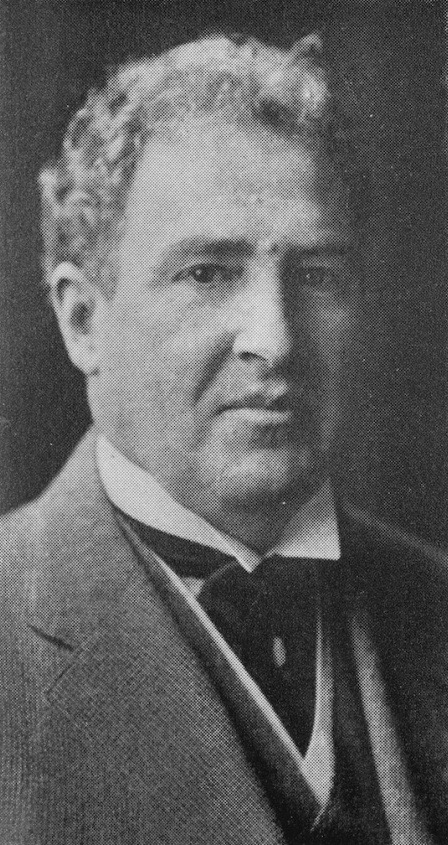
- Bennes in 1916
- Born: John Virginius Bennes; August 23, 1867; Peru, Illinois, U.S.
- Died: November 29, 1943 (aged 76); Los Angeles, California, U.S.
- Education: University of Chicago
- Occupation: Architect
- Notable work: Geiser Grand Hotel; Hot Lake Hotel; Hollywood Theatre, Portland, Oregon, U.S.

John Virginius Bennes (August 23, 1867 – November 29, 1943) was an American architect who designed numerous buildings throughout the state of Oregon, particularly in Baker City and Portland. In Baker City he did an extensive redesign of the Geiser Grand Hotel, designed several homes, and a now-demolished Elks building. He moved to Portland in 1907 and continued practicing there until 1942.

Bennes designed numerous projects in the Portland area, as well as in Corvallis, Prineville, and other areas of Oregon. He and his firms produced the designs for at least 20 buildings that are listed on the National Register of Historic Places (NRHP). His work includes the design of more than 35 buildings on the Oregon State University campus in Corvallis, as well as plans for 12 other building additions and renovations. He also designed the administration building at Eastern Oregon University.

Bennes is also credited with design work on the Hollywood Theatre in Portland and the Liberty Theatre in Astoria. He worked with Harry A. Herzog on some of the theaters, and Albert Mercier and Lee Arden Thomas have also been credited as collaborators on some of them.

== Early life ==
Bennes was born in Peru, Illinois on August 23, 1867, to Czech immigrants Jan Beneš and Petronila Hlaváčková, raised in Chicago. He was purportedly a cousin of Czechoslovak President Edvard Beneš though their surname is extremely common.

He studied at the University of Chicago and spent a year abroad at the School of Fine Arts at Prague University, graduating with a degree in architecture in 1890. After graduating from college, Bennes relocated from Chicago to Baker City, Oregon around 1900, where he invested in the region's gold mines. On July 1, 1900, he married Annice Smalley; born December 4, 1876).

== Career ==
After relocating to Baker City, Bennes began his career in architecture, redesigning the Geiser Grand Hotel, as well as designing the Elks Building and several residences. He relocated to Portland in 1906 and partnered with architects Eric W. Hendricks and Willard F. Tobey. Lewis Irvine Thompson also joined the firm. Bennes was a member of the Oregon Chapter of the American Institute of Architects, serving as vice president 1920-21 and as the chapter president in 1922. Bennes practiced on his own from 1914 to 1926. Then he partnered with Harry A. Herzog until 1931 and the onset of the Great Depression, when he returned to solo practice.

His design for Eastern Oregon University's Inlow Hall was a Renaissance Revival-style building that serves as an administration building, housing the admissions, registrar's, financial aid, student affairs and president's offices.

Bennes designed several Portland hotels, including the Broadway Hotel, the Hamilton Hotel, the Treves Hotel and the Cornelius Hotel. The Cornelius has been unoccupied since the 1980s, but has been the subject of various restoration plans, most recently in February 2015.

Bennes was a contemporary of Frank Lloyd Wright and is said to have been "a product of the Chicago school of architecture."

== Later life and death ==
Bennes relocated from Portland to Los Angeles, California, in 1943 after a bout of unnamed illness, where he died the same year. Some of his plans and drawings are held in the Cachot Therkelsen Collection with the University of Oregon Libraries.

== Projects ==
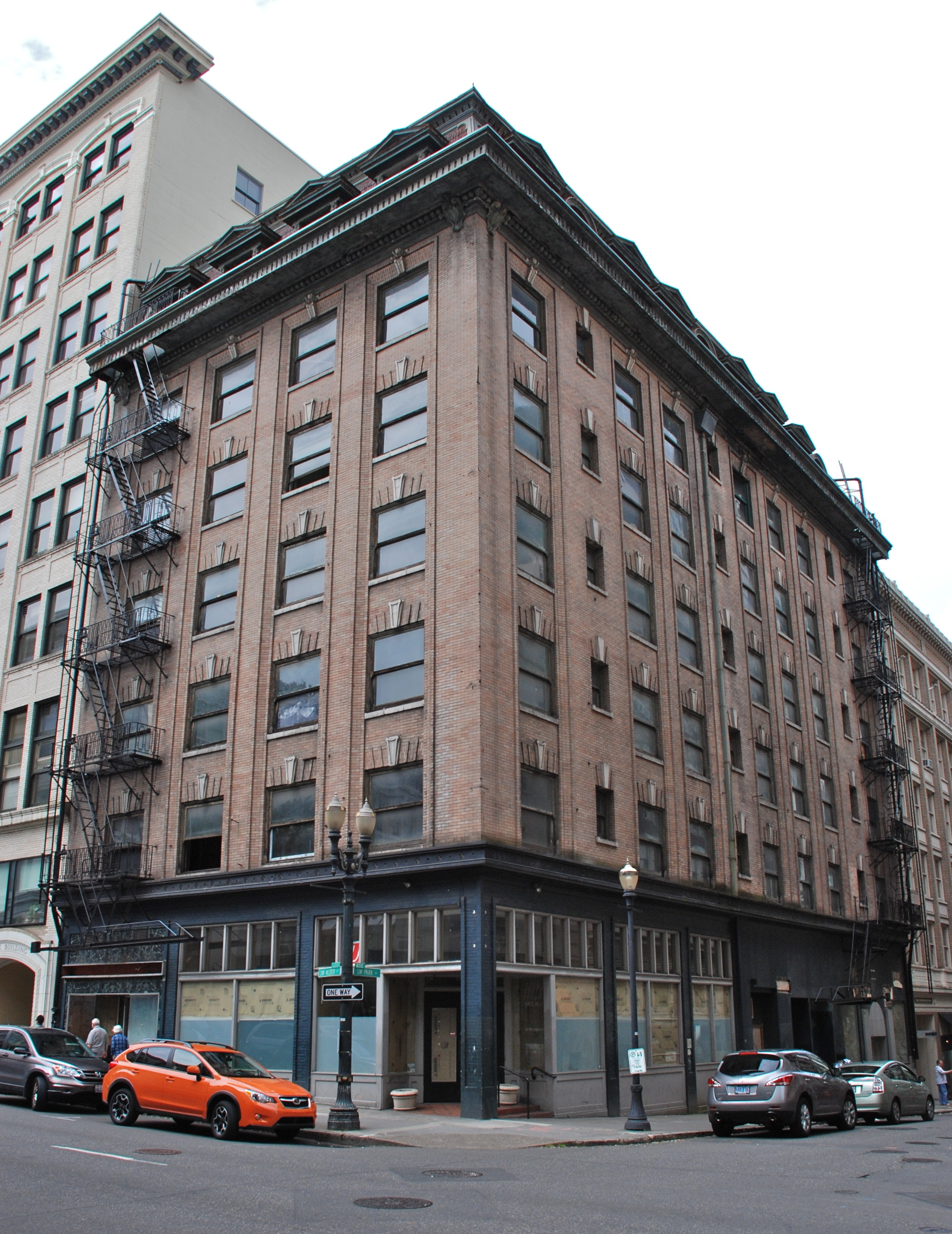
Cornelius Hotel in Portland, Oregon.

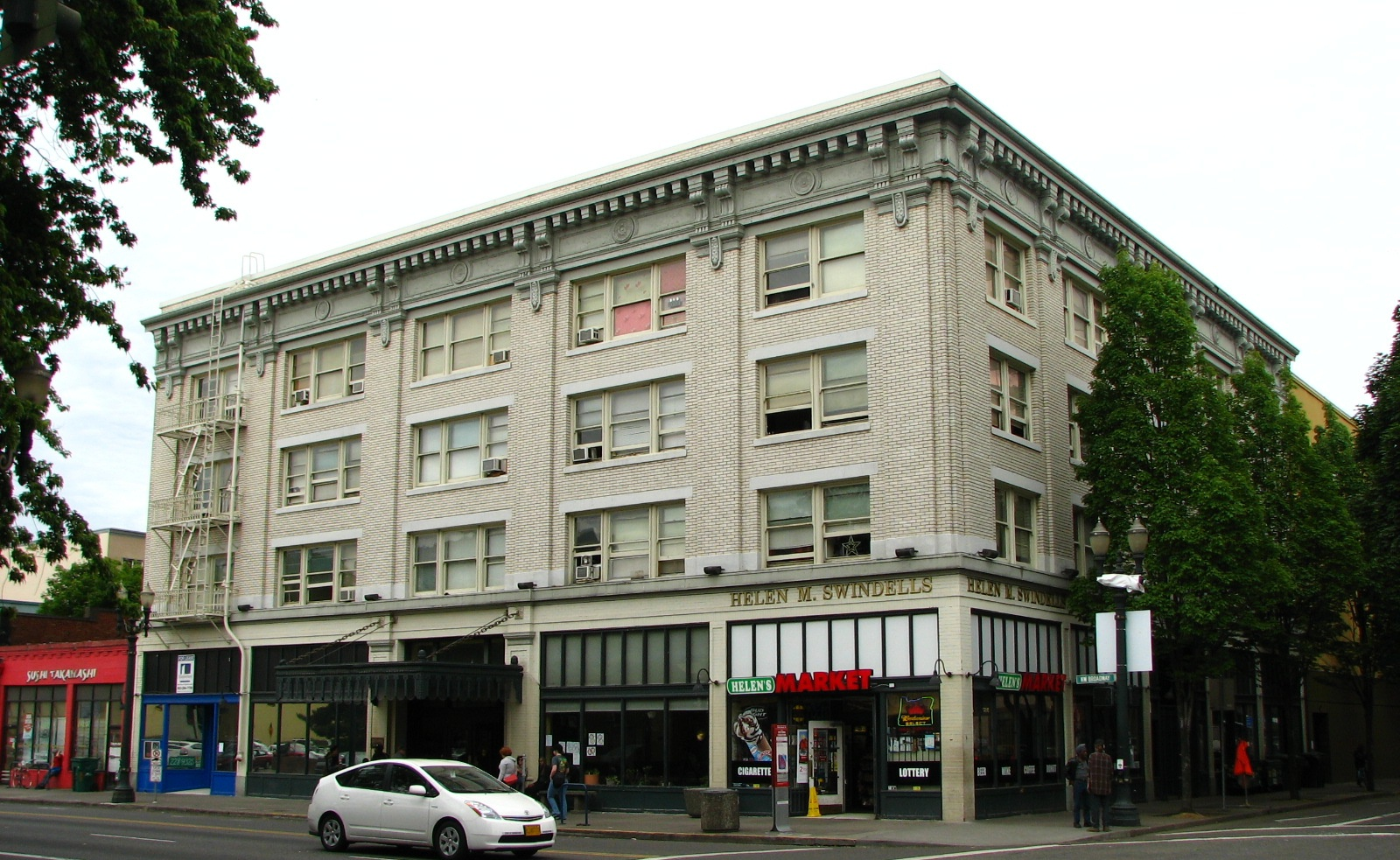
Broadway Hotel in Portland, Oregon.

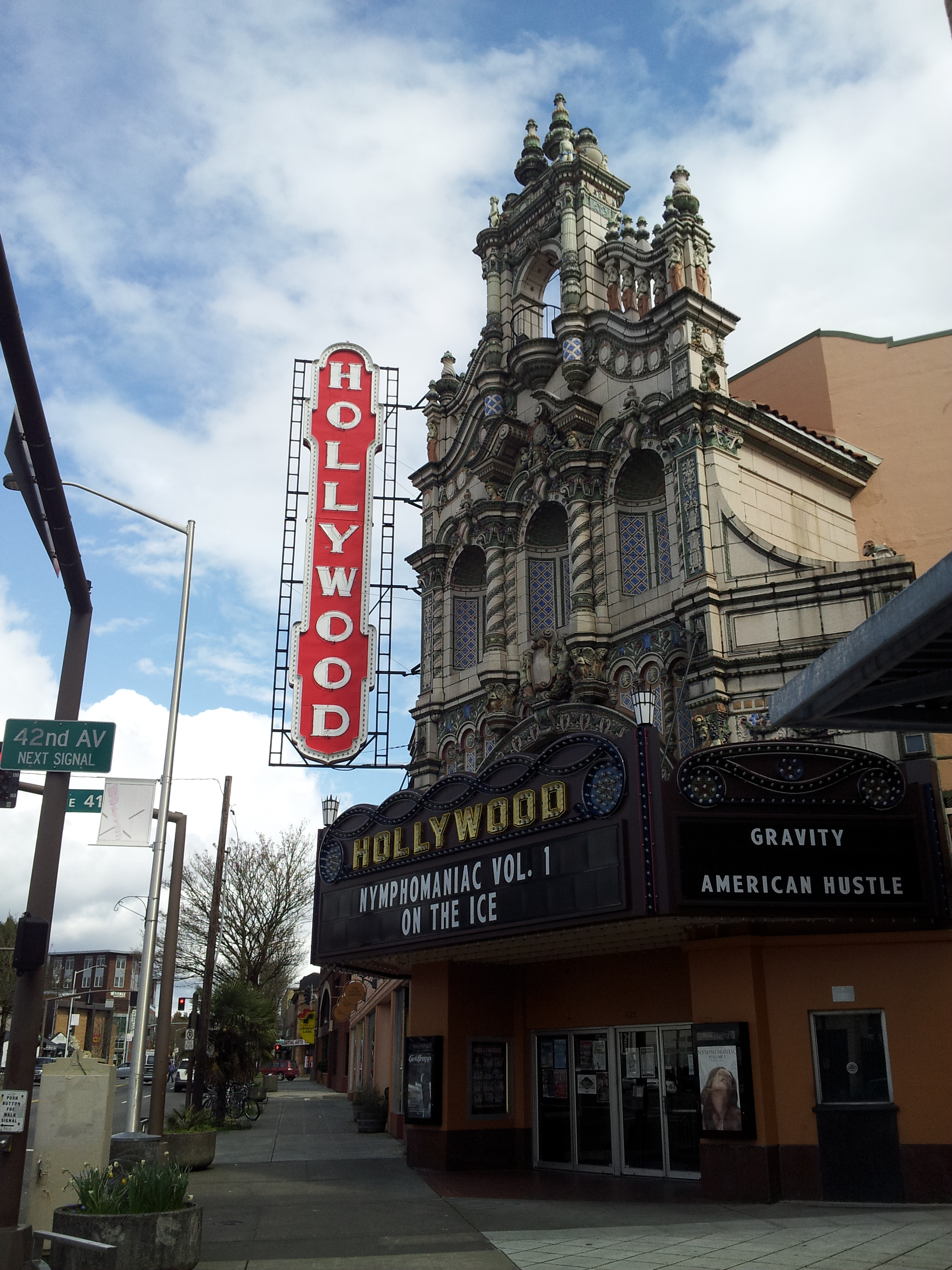
Hollywood Theatre in the Hollywood District of Portland, Oregon.

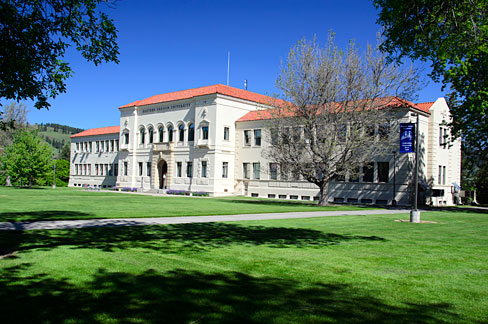
Inlow Hall at Eastern Oregon University.

- John Virginius and Annice Bennes House (1911), Portland (NRHP)
- Geiser Grand Hotel (1900 remodel), Baker City (NRHP contributing to the Baker Historic District)
- Gray's West & Co. Pioneer Chapel (1910), Baker City, (NRHP contributing to the Baker Historic District as the Charles A. Johns House)
- Hot Lake Hotel (1906), La Grande (NRHP)
- Oregon State University buildings (1907–1941), part of the Oregon State University Historic District, Corvallis (NRHP)
  - Agricultural Hall, now Strand Agricultural Hall (1909–1913)
  - Bexell Hall (1922)
  - Delta Zeta and Alpha Gamma sororities (1930 and 1928) (Bennes & Herzog)
  - Kidder Hall (1918)
  - McAlexander Fieldhouse (1911)
  - Weatherford Hall (1928) (Bennes & Herzog)
  - Women's Building (1926)
- Poultry Building and Incubator House (1913 remodel and 1907 design), 800 SW Washington Ave, Corvallis (NRHP)
- Saint Francis de Sales Cathedral (c. 1905), Baker City, Oregon

=== Bennes, Hendricks & Tobey (1906–1909) ===
- Thomas M. Baldwin House (1907), 126 W 1st St, Prineville (NRHP)
- Cornelius Hotel (1908), 525 SW Park Ave, Portland (NRHP)
- Dacres Hotel (1907 remodel), 4th and Main streets, Walla Walla, Washington (NRHP)
- L. B. Menefee House (1908), 1634 SW Myrtle St, Portland (NRHP)
- First Presbyterian Church (1909), Corvallis

=== Bennes, Hendricks & Thompson (1909–1911) ===
- Page and Son Apartments (1909), 723–37 E Burnside, Portland (NRHP)
- William Bittle Wells House (1910), 1515 SW Clifton St, Portland (NRHP)

=== Bennes and Hendricks (1911–1913) ===
- Broadway Hotel (1913), Portland (NRHP)
- Hamilton Hotel (1913), Portland, cataloged by the Historic American Buildings Survey, now demolished
- Pacific Hardware & Steel Company Warehouse (1911), 2181 NW Nicolai St, Portland (NRHP)
- Treves Hotel (Joyce Hotel) (1912), 1035-1039 SW Stark St, Portland

=== Independent (1914–1925) ===
- Astoria City Hall (1923), 1095 Duane St, Astoria, originally Astoria Savings Bank, which closed in 1929; the building became Astoria's City Hall in 1939 (NRHP contributing to the Astoria Downtown Historic District)
- Coleman–Scott House (1916), 2110 NE 16th Ave, Portland (NRHP)
- H. Liebes and Company Building (1917), 625 SW Broadway, Portland (NRHP)
- Heppner Hotel (1919), 124 N Main St, Heppner (NRHP)
- Howard Hall (1923), Salem, part of the former Oregon School for the Blind, demolished in 2015
- A. H. Maegly House (1914), 226 SW Kingston St, Portland (NRHP)
- Abraham Tichner House (1918), 114 SW Kingston Ave, Portland (NRHP)

=== Bennes & Herzog (1925–1931) ===
- John Bexell House (1926), 3009 NW Van Buren Ave, Corvallis (NRHP)
- Churchill Hall (1925), Southern Oregon University, Ashland
- Hollywood Theatre (1923), 4122 NE Sandy Blvd, Portland (NRHP)
- Inlow Hall (1927), Eastern Oregon University, La Grande (NRHP)
- Jeanne Manor Apartment Building (1931), 1431 SW Park Ave, Portland (NRHP)
- Liberty Theatre (1924), Astoria (NRHP)
- B'nai B'rith Summer Camp (1928), Grand Ronde
- Parkway Manor (1931), 1609 SW Park Ave, Portland

=== Independent (1933–1943) ===
- Lieuallen Administration Building (1935), Western Oregon University, Monmouth
