= Inlow Hall =

Inlow Hall may refer to:

- Indiana University Robert H. McKinney School of Law, Indiana
- Inlow Hall (Eastern Oregon University), La Grande, Oregon
