= Dacres Hotel =

- U.S. National Register of Historic Places
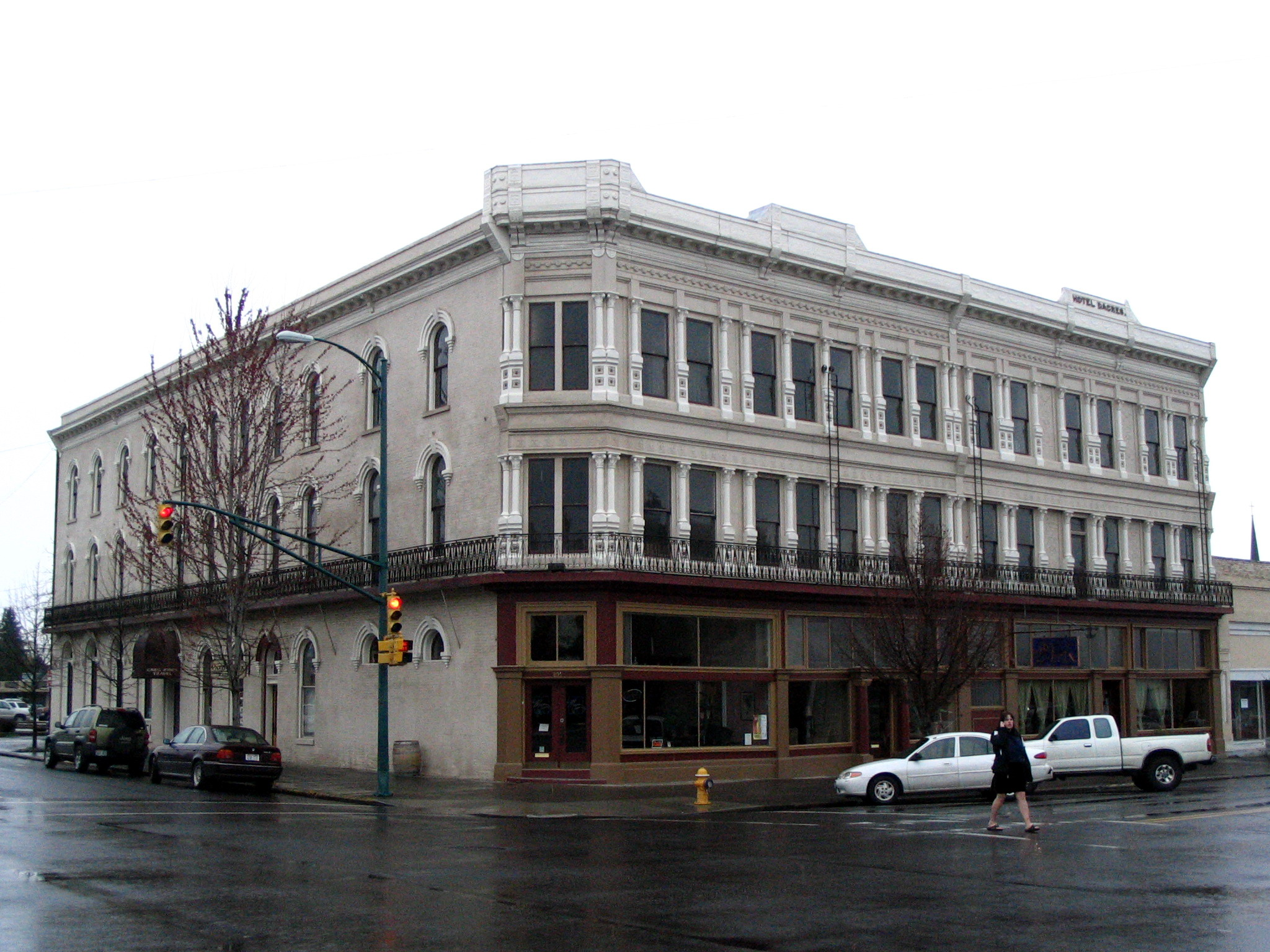
- Dacres Hotel

- Location within Washington (state)
- Location: 4th and Main streets Walla Walla, Washington
- Coordinates: 46°3′56″N 118°20′27″W
- Built: 1873, 1899
- Architect: Bennes, Hendricks & Tobey (1907 remodel)
- Architectural style: Italianate
- NRHP reference No.: 74001984
- Added to NRHP: November 5, 1974

The Dacres Hotel is a historic hotel in Walla Walla, Washington, United States. Rebuilt from the ruins of Walla Walla's first brick hotel, the 1873 Stine House, the Italianate building was re-opened in 1899 by James E. Dacres. The building is a rare and exceptional local example of the pre-fabricated cast iron facades manufactured by the Mesker Brothers. Mostly unchanged in appearance since its reconstruction, the interior has been remodeled several times over the years including in 1907 by Portland architects Bennes, Hendricks & Tobey. It was added to the National Register of Historic Places on November 5, 1974.

Ceasing operations as a hotel in 1959, the building currently houses a live music and events venue known as 'The Dacres' on the ground floor while the upper floors remain unused.

== History ==
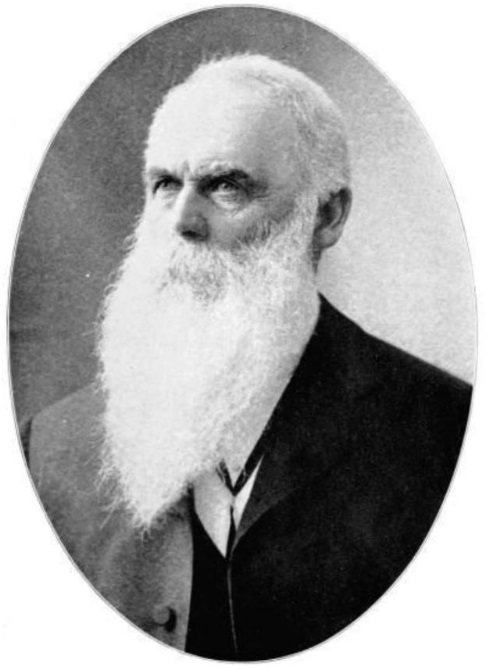
Frederick Stine

=== Stine House ===
Frederick Stine was born in Uniontown, Pennsylvania on November 24, 1825, one of 14 children. In the 1830s the family moved to a farm near Fairfield, Ohio where Frederick picked up the blacksmith trade from his father. In May 1852 Frederick, his brothers and twenty-three other men set off from St. Joseph, Missouri bound for Sacramento, California, reaching their destination in a mere two months and one day. After spending time in the bustling mining towns of Marysville and Yreka plying his trade and nearly succumbing from typhoid fever, Frederick headed North for Eastern Washington on a trip that would prove much more difficult than his first.

Stine arrived in the booming village of Walla Walla in May 1862 with, by his own account, only the clothes on his back and 75 cents to his name. He scraped together enough loaned money to purchase a corner lot on Fourth and Main streets and build upon it a shanty to house his blacksmith shop. With the small frontier town swarming with miners and emigrants with their horses and wagons, his shop proved very lucrative and with additional business from the cavalry stationed at Fort Walla Walla he was able to pay his creditors back within a few months. In 1863 he helped form the first fire department in town and in 1865 was elected to city council, to which he was re-elected several times. By 1872 Stine had amassed a small fortune. He moved his small shop off his lot and began constructing a 3-story brick building. First conceived as an office building, the plans soon changed into a hotel. The hotel was built of bricks fired in Weston, Oregon, lime mortar shipped from San Francisco and most expensively, windows made in France that had to be shipped around Cape Horn and portaged up the Columbia River to Wallula. Opened in August 1873, the Stine House was the first 3-story brick building in Walla Walla and with 50 rooms it was the largest hotel in Washington Territory. It was designed in a simple Italianate style, with corbel window arches (which are still extant on the building's east facade), a ground floor arcade and a simple brick cornice; a wooden balcony wrapped around the front of the building above the first floor. Although Stine built it and named it after himself, he never ran the hotel, instead leasing it to various operators. He would continue his blacksmith business at 4th and Rose Streets until retiring in 1880. He died in June 1909.

The Stine became the town's social gathering place and the stopping point for all the major stage lines from Lewiston and LaGrande. It even offered free carriage service between the hotel and the train depot, and reasonably priced service to anywhere else in town. Featuring an opulent bridal suite, it also became a popular regional destination for newlyweds. The hotel was so well appointed that several local families chose to make it their permanent residence while renting out their own homes. In a letter to the Deseret News in December 1881, a traveler visiting the city spoke highly of the Stine's atmosphere:

One great and satisfactory acquisition to the place is the Stine House, where travelers in broad cloth or canvas suits are treated as human beings, for the proprietors study the comfort of the miner, granger or merchant with the same degree of carefulness. The gentleman in charge, whose name I have unfortunately forgotten, but is called "Infant" or "Little Boy", weighs nearly 300 pounds and is a thoroughbred at his business. (Note: The proprietor of the Stine House during this time was Albert Small, who had taken over management from Thomas O'Brien in 1879.)

— G.H., Letter to the Deseret News

The Stine became the meeting place for many dignitaries, most notably president Rutherford B. Hayes and his entourage including his wife Lucy Webb Hayes and commanding general William Tecumseh Sherman, who dined in the hotel's restaurant during their visit to Walla Walla in October 1880.Business was good enough that the hotel was doubled in size in 1882, extending it south to the alley and bringing the room total to 100. A new Italianate wooden cornice was added to the entire building.

The Stine remained the town's preeminent hotel until the night of July 23, 1892, when it was gutted by a fire that had spread from an adjacent French restaurant. Despite the fire department being located only a block away, their response was reportedly too slow to rescue the building. All the hotel's guests and staff were able to escape but the property loss on the Stine House alone was estimated at $30,000, only one third of which was insured. Stine blamed the city for his loss and even threatened suit, but nothing came of it. Any attempts at rebuilding were stalled by the Panic of 1893, and it stood as an empty ruin for the rest of the decade.

=== Hotel Dacres ===
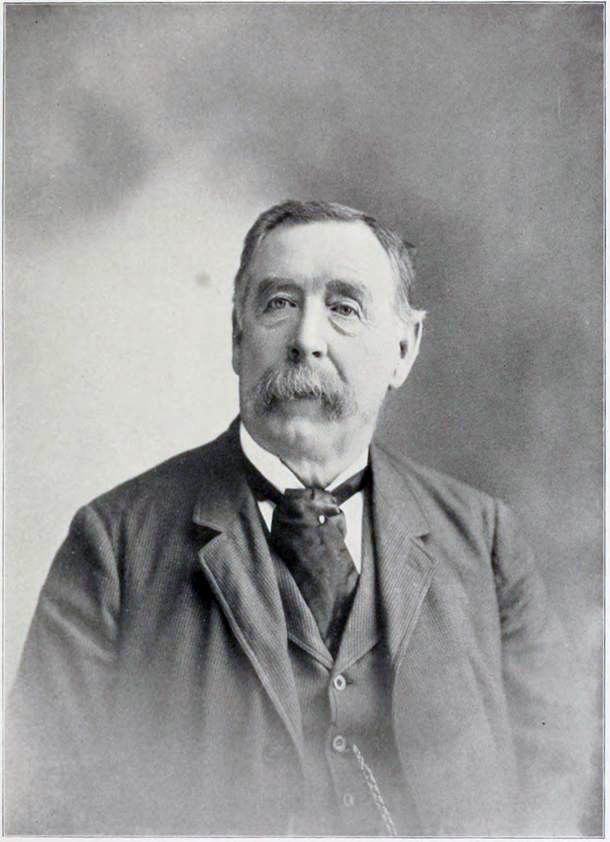
George Dacres in 1901

In 1899, with the economy on the rebound, a group of investors headed by Walla Walla pioneer George Dacres and his son James E. Dacres purchased the burnt out shell of the Stine House and began to rebuild it, saving as much of the original structure as they could rather than completely starting over. The hotel was once again doubled in size and the entire Main Street frontage was rebuilt with a pre-fabricated cast iron facade manufactured by Mesker Brothers in St. Louis, Missouri and shipped to Walla Walla by rail. It was and is the largest Mesker facade in Washington State. The second floor was adorned with a wrought iron balcony, echoing the wooden one that had adorned the Stine House. The hotel's lobby was lavishly decorated with red carpet, oak furniture, potted plants, polished brass spittoons and a grand piano. The rooms were no less accommodating and even came with a free pitcher of ice water. Other guest services included a larger restaurant, a barber shop, Victorian Turkish baths and later a first-class bar and a grill room featuring live music. Officially opened for business on November 1, 1899, the revived hostelry quickly regained its status as Walla Walla's premier hotel and thanks to its proximity to the Keylor Grand Opera House, the regions's main Vaudeville venue, the Dacres would see such notable guests as Louisa May Alcott, John Philip Sousa, Harry Lauder and Al Jolson, among others.

The hotel suffered another large interior fire in 1905, caused by a shorting electrical fan, but remained open while repairs were made. In 1907, the hotel's then manager, Art Harris (a previous manager of the Geyser Grand Hotel in Baker City, Oregon), commissioned Portland architects Bennes, Hendricks & Tobey to completely remodel the hotel, with plans calling for a complete interior remodel, adding one or even two floors and an elevator, but this never fully came to pass. With a scaled-back interior remodeling complete, the hotel reopened on April 1, 1908, touting a new European plan. The hotel was visited by its second president when William Howard Taft made his visit to Walla Walla in 1911. By the 1920s, many other larger and more modern hotels were opening in town, and the Dacres settled in as a mid-range traveler's hotel, housing road and railroad crews and itinerant farm workers. The hotel officially left the Dacres family in 1921 when it was sold to E.C. Davis, who had previously run the Revere Hotel in Pomeroy, Washington. In 1924 Eugene Tausick, a leading businessman and the owner of the company in charge of the rival Grand Hotel, purchased the hotel from Davis. While various upgrades were made to the interior and the storefronts over the years, and while several pediments and finials were removed or lost from the top of the building, the Dacres's outward appearance remains much as it had been in 1899, as it was spared the fate of urban renewal which claimed many historic buildings in the surrounding blocks in the 1950s and '60s. The hotel closed its doors on May 25, 1959, with the owners citing the state's impending $1 minimum wage law as the primary reason. Longtime ground floor tenant Little's drug store would close at the same time. In 1966 the Tausick estate sold the building to O. D. Keen Construction Co. who disposed of most of the hotel's furnishings, fixtures, signage and even room keys at public auction.

For the next few decades the building remained vacant save for several small businesses on the ground floor. Several plans to restore the building and even the original Stine House name were proposed in the mid-1960s but were always stymied by the expense of bringing the building up to current fire codes. In 1974, the hotel was nominated for state and national landmark status as part of a history project by Washington State University student Robert Hergert. It was accepted to the National Register in September 1974, only the second building in the County to be registered (the first being Fort Walla Walla). In 1982 the building was purchased by Robert Finch who began restoration on the ground floor in earnest. In 2013 the ground floor, previously occupied by several restaurants, was remodeled into a performing arts venue known as Main Street Studios before closing several years later. In 2018, the venue was revived as "The Dacres", hosting live music and other events.

== See also ==
- National Register of Historic Places listings in Walla Walla County, Washington
