= Hollywood Theatre (Portland, Oregon) =

Theater in Portland, Oregon, U.S.

- U.S. National Register of Historic Places
- Portland Historic Landmark
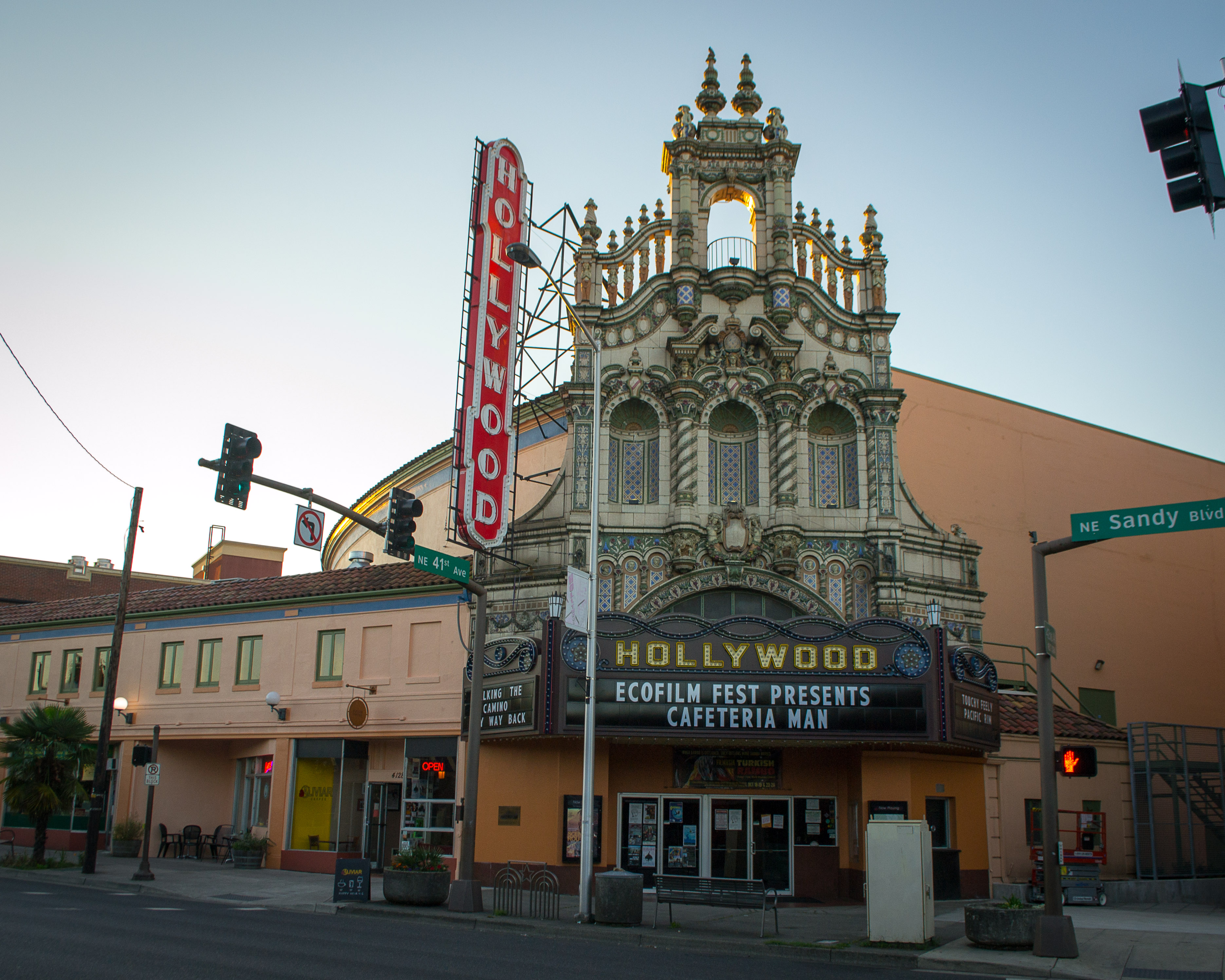
- The marquee and front facade on Sandy Boulevard in 2013

- Location within Portland, Oregon Location within Oregon Location within the United States
- Location: 4122 NE Sandy Boulevard; Portland, Oregon
- Coordinates: 45°32′08″N 122°37′14″W
- Built: 1926; 100 years ago
- Architect: Bennes & Herzog
- NRHP reference No.: 83002172
- Added to NRHP: September 1, 1983

The Hollywood Theatre is a historic movie theater in northeast Portland, Oregon built in 1926 and currently operating as a non-profit. It is a central historical landmark of the Hollywood District, which is named after the theatre itself. The Hollywood Theatre, located at 4122 NE Sandy Boulevard, was placed on the National Register of Historic Places in 1983 and is considered to be a gem of Northeast Portland's historic culture and tradition. The theater's two-story street-facing facade was topped with roof tiles that reinforced its Spanish Colonial architectural style. It screens movies in various formats, including 16mm, 35mm, and 70mm, as well as digital projection. As of 2026, it is the only theater in Oregon showing movies in 70mm film.

== History ==
Commissioned by the theatre chain Jensen and Herberg as a companion to the Liberty Theater in Astoria, Oregon, architects Bennes and Herzog designed the building in multiple styles including Spanish Colonial Revival (exterior) and after the Baths of Caracalla and Bernini (interior). The theater opened on Saturday, July 17, 1926, with 1,491 seats, as a venue for vaudeville and silent movies.

In 1959, the Hollywood Theatre screened King Vidor's Solomon and Sheba, making it the first 70mm film presentation ever shown in Portland. The venue became a Cinerama theater in 1961, utilizing the ultra-widescreen process until 1963. It was still labelled a "Cinerama theater" until 1969, running exclusively 70-millimeter films.

In 1975, the theater was divided into three auditoriums, and ran second run films throughout the 1980s and 1990s. The theater became a non-profit organization in 1997, but continued to struggle financially.

Starting in 2011, major renovations were done, including new seats, screens, sound systems and an updated paint job. In 2013, a Kickstarter campaign raised the funds necessary to erect a new marquee, and in 2015, 70-millimeter capability was re-installed, making it the sole remaining theater in the state to have it.

The Hollywood Theatre currently screens first run films, along with a range of classic cinema, exploitation, educational, independent, and experimental films. The theatre focuses on screening repertory films on 35-millimeter and 70-millimeter film.

The theater hosts many film festivals including Noir City, Portland Horror Film Festival, the H.P. Lovecraft Film Festival, and the Portland Ecofilm Festival. Signature series include: Kung Fu Theaters, B-movie Bingo, Queer Horror, Cinema Classicsand Mississippi Records Music & Film.

In 2016, to celebrate its 90th anniversary, the theater screened 2001: A Space Odyssey, Lawrence of Arabia (1962), West Side Story (1961) and Aliens (1986) in 70mm.

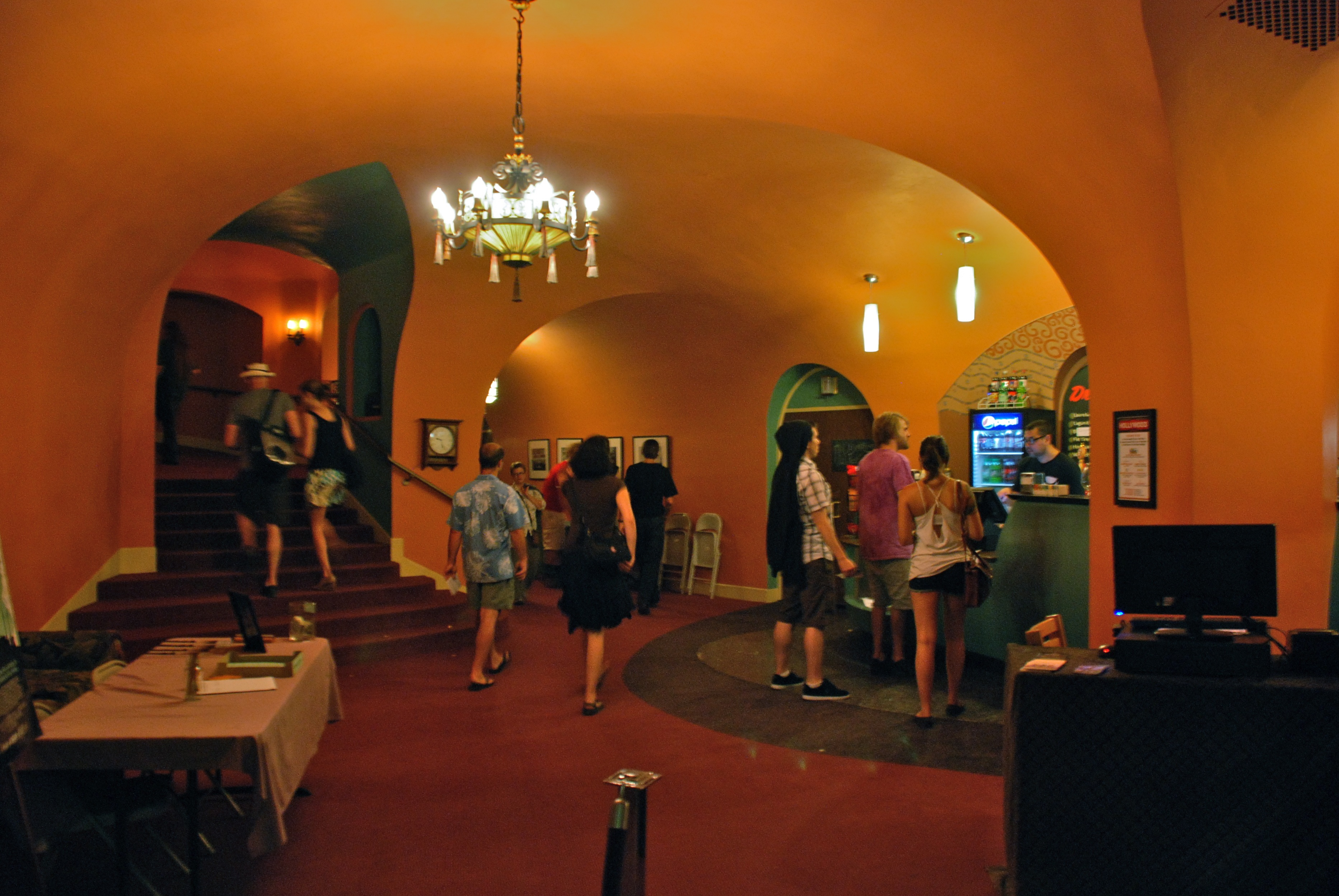
Interior lobby in 2011

The main auditorium has a 50-foot screen and 384 seats, while two smaller auditoriums are located upstairs, each seating 111. The theater is self-owned and operated by a non-profit organization of the same name. Its mission is to preserve and maintain the historic theater and use it to present a diverse program of films.

In 2015, the theatre's original 70mm projector was repaired. Since then, nearly every 70mm screening has sold out. In addition to The Hateful Eight (2015), they’ve screened 2001: A Space Odyssey (1968), Vertigo (1958) and The Wild Bunch (1969) in 70mm.

In July 2026, the theater celebrated its 10th anniversary with "100 Festival" featuring a week of classic films, rare archival screenings, and special events. There was also a screening of the first film ever shown at the Hollywood in 1926, More Pay, Less Work (1926), a silent film, accompanied by a live pipe organ performance. The proceeds from the event went to the Columbia River Theater Organ Society to maintain and preserve the Hollywood's original Wurlitzer theatre pipe organ.

=== Famous guests ===
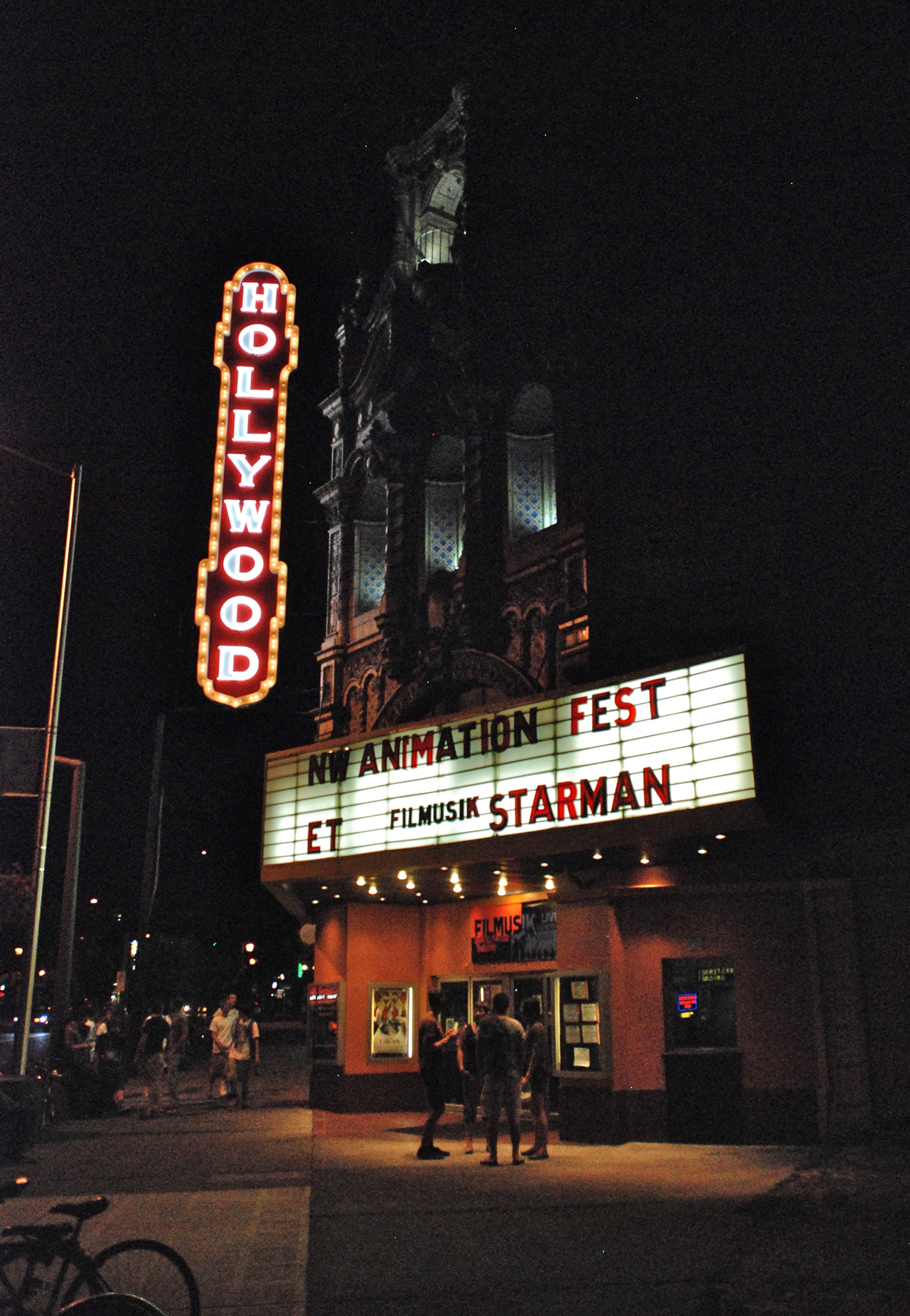
The venue at night, 2011

Over the years, the Hollywood Theatre has hosted many filmmakers and special guests. In 2011, Gus Van Sant and James Franco appeared for a Q&A to accompany a special screening of Van Sant's My Own Private Idaho (1991), which was filmed in Portland. That same year, Carrie Brownstein and Jonathan Krisel hosted a local Portlandia premiere at The Hollywood. In 2012, Academy Award-winning documentary filmmaker Barbara Kopple presented her documentary about journalist and philanthropist Ellen Ratner.

Since 2015, the Hollywood has hosted many guests, including RZA, Quentin Tarantino, Guy Maddin, Pam Grier, Todd Haynes,Michael Ironside, Piper Laurie, P.J. Soles,and Joe Dante.

In June 2024, Academy Award-winning documentary filmmaker Steve James attended a special tribute screening of the 1977 Portland Trail Blazers documentary Fast Break (1978) honoring Bill Walton. During that visit, James participated in a live audience Q&A alongside author and Fast Break star Larry Colton.

In early 2025, the Hollywood welcomed filmmaker Gints ilbalodis who participated in a Q&A following his Oscar-winning independent animated film Flow (2024). In spring 2026, the Hollywood Theatre presented a six-week film series dedicated to Iranian filmmaker Jafar Panahi in collaboration with Portland State University as part of an ongoing collaboration between the two organizations. In June 2026, horror director George Mihalka appeared at a screening of his horror classic My Bloody Valentine (1981).

As part of the theatre's 100th anniversary in 2026, Kurt Russell attended a screening of The Thing (1982).

In October 2026, the Hollywood hosted the 31st Annual H. P. Lovecraft Film Festival featuring genre writer Philip Fracassi.

== Airport theater ==
After three years of discussions and development, in February 2017, the Hollywood Theatre opened a 17-seat microcinema at Portland International Airport in collaboration with the Port of Portland's PDX Art Program. The microcinema was subsequently expanded to 22 seats and is currently located in Concourse C, after security. The theater shows an hourlong loop of short films from Pacific Northwest filmmakers no longer than 20 minutes in any genre, including documentaries, music videos, animations, and short fiction. A new run of films is announced every quarter. Admission is free for airport visitors with tickets.

== Movie Madness ==
In 2017, the Hollywood Theatre purchased the iconic Portland video store Movie Madness, and its collection of over 90,000 movies. Movie Madness is slated to relocate across the street from Hollywood Theatre in 2027. Numerous film directors have made statements in support of the Hollywood Film District, including filmmakers Gus Van Sant, Sean Baker, Todd Haynes, and Kelly Reichardt.

== See also ==
- Portland Latin American Film Festival
