= John Virginius and Annice Bennes House =

Historic building in Portland, Oregon, U.S.

- U.S. National Register of Historic Places
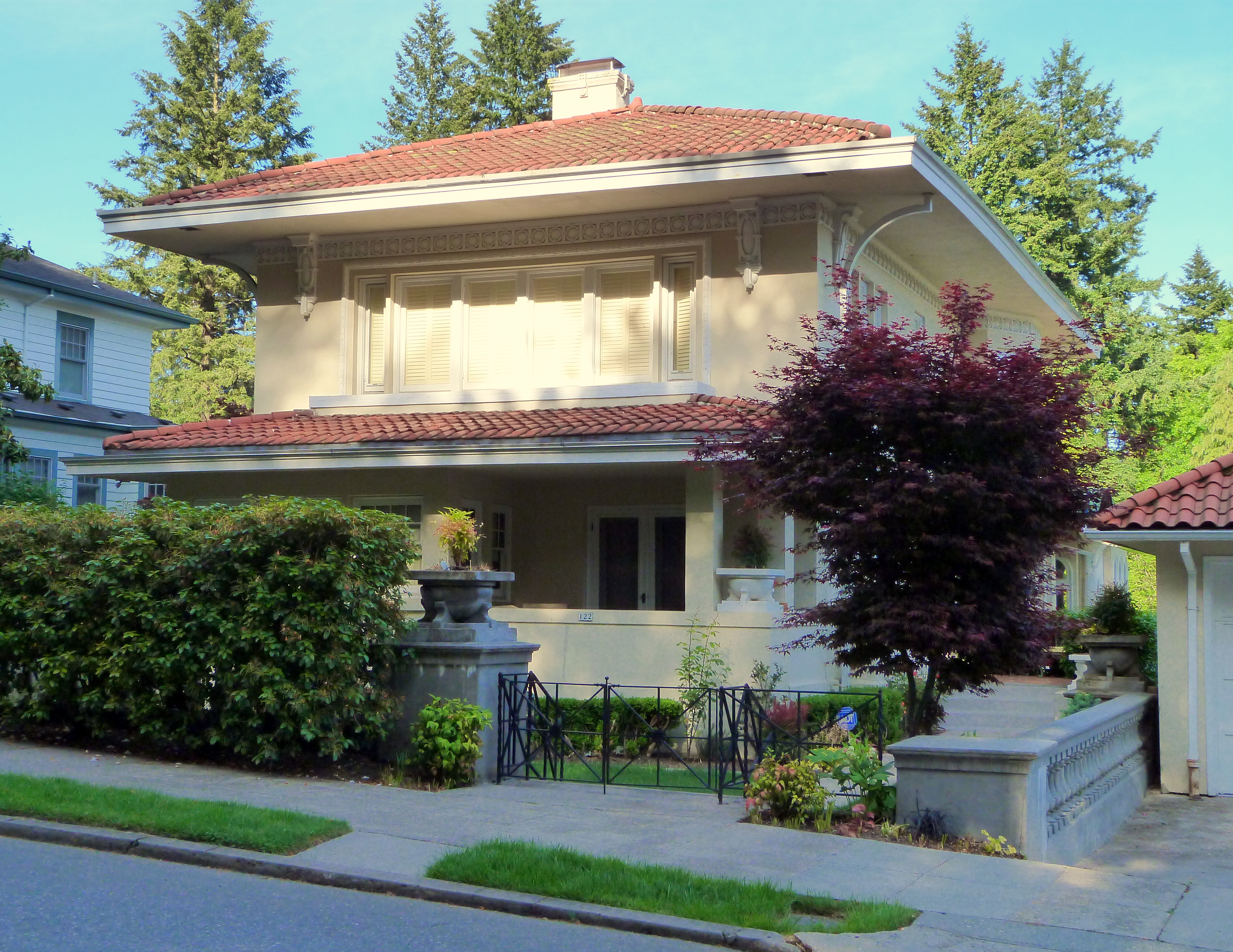

- Location within Portland, Oregon Location within Oregon Location within the United States
- Location: 122 SW Marconi Avenue; Portland, Oregon, U.S.
- Coordinates: 45.522874°N 122.705319°W
- Built: 1911
- Architect: John Virginius Bennes
- Architectural style: Mediterranean Revival; Prairie School
- NRHP reference No.: 13000119
- Added to NRHP: March 27, 2013

The John Virginius and Annice Bennes House is a house located in the Arlington Heights section of Portland, Oregon designed by prominent architect John Virginius Bennes for himself and his wife, Annice. The house is registered on the National Register for Historic Places.

The house was designed in the style of Mediterranean Revival and Prairie School architecture, the latter of which Bennes has been credited with for introducing to Oregon.

== See also ==
- National Register of Historic Places listings in Southwest Portland, Oregon
