= A. H. Maegly House =

Historic building in Portland, Oregon, U.S.

- U.S. National Register of Historic Places
- Portland Historic Landmark
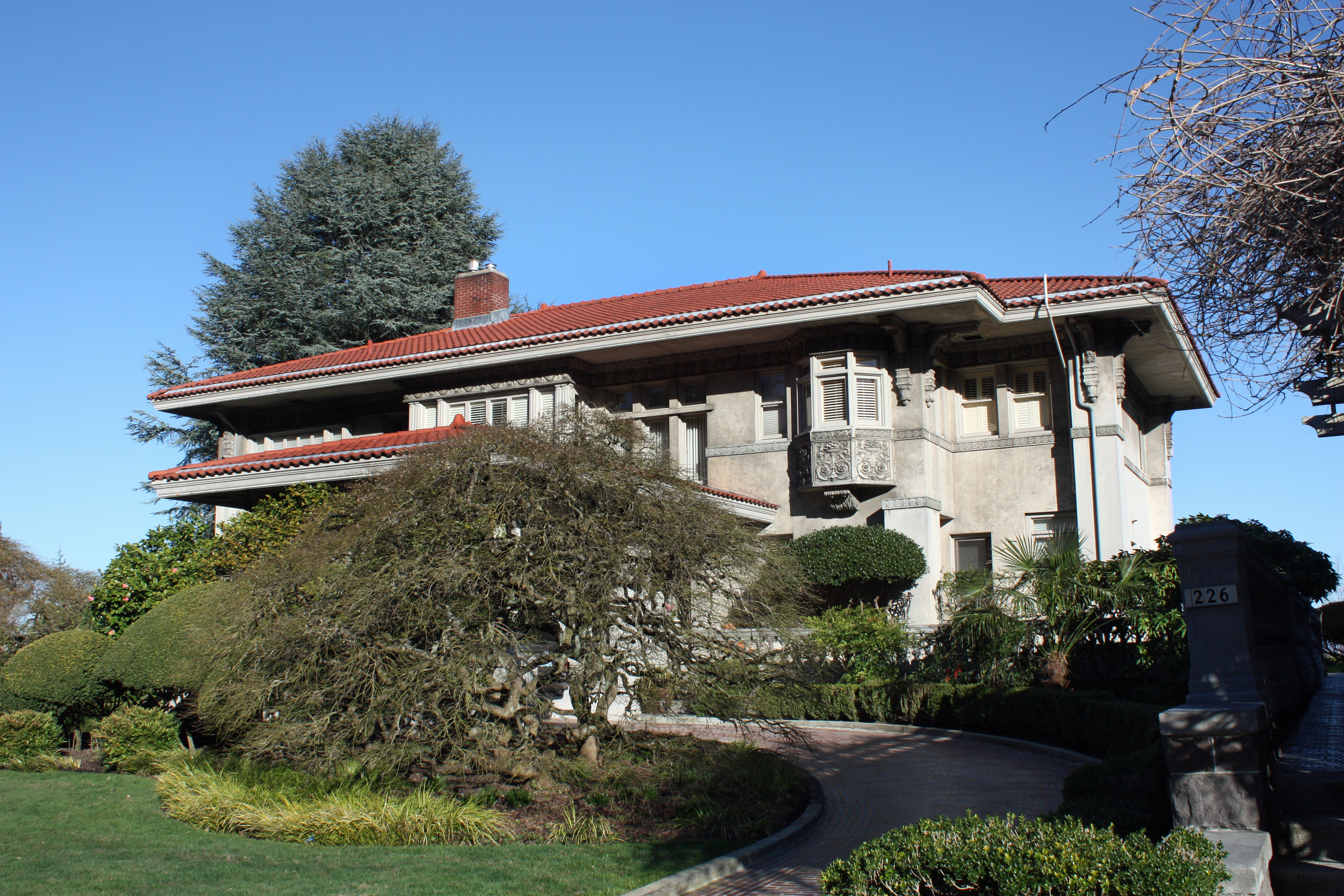
- West exterior in 2010

- Location within Portland, Oregon Location within Oregon Location within the United States
- Location: 226 SW Kingston Avenue; Portland, Oregon
- Coordinates: 45°31′20″N 122°42′23″W
- Area: less than one acre
- Built: 1914–15
- Architect: Bennes, John V.
- Architectural style: Prairie School
- NRHP reference No.: 81000518
- Added to NRHP: December 2, 1981

The A. H. Maegly House is a house located in southwest Portland, Oregon, listed on the National Register of Historic Places. It is located in the upscale Arlington Heights neighborhood. Built for Aaron H. Maegly (born 1854), a wealthy Portland broker, the distinctive house was completed in 1915. It was designed by Portland architect John Virginius Bennes, in the Prairie School style, an architectural style that is rare in Oregon.

== Description ==
The house is constructed of reinforced concrete, covered by stucco, and has a red tile roof. Among the features of the Maegly House that are often included in Prairie School-style dwellings are decorative corner brackets and ornamental friezes, above and below the second-floor windows. One narrow frieze positioned just below the eaves encircles the entire house except where interrupted at the corners by the decorative brackets. The interior is noteworthy for its use of high-quality Honduran mahogany. Every room in the house has multiple windows, and every ground-floor room opens to a porch or terrace. Downtown Portland and Mount Hood can be seen from the living room, dining room and kitchen. The home is surrounded by a garden notable for its collection of Japanese maples, planted by Aaron Maegly's wife. A circular brick driveway leads to a porte-cochère.

== See also ==
- National Register of Historic Places listings in Southwest Portland, Oregon
