= Poultry Building and Incubator House =

- U.S. National Register of Historic Places
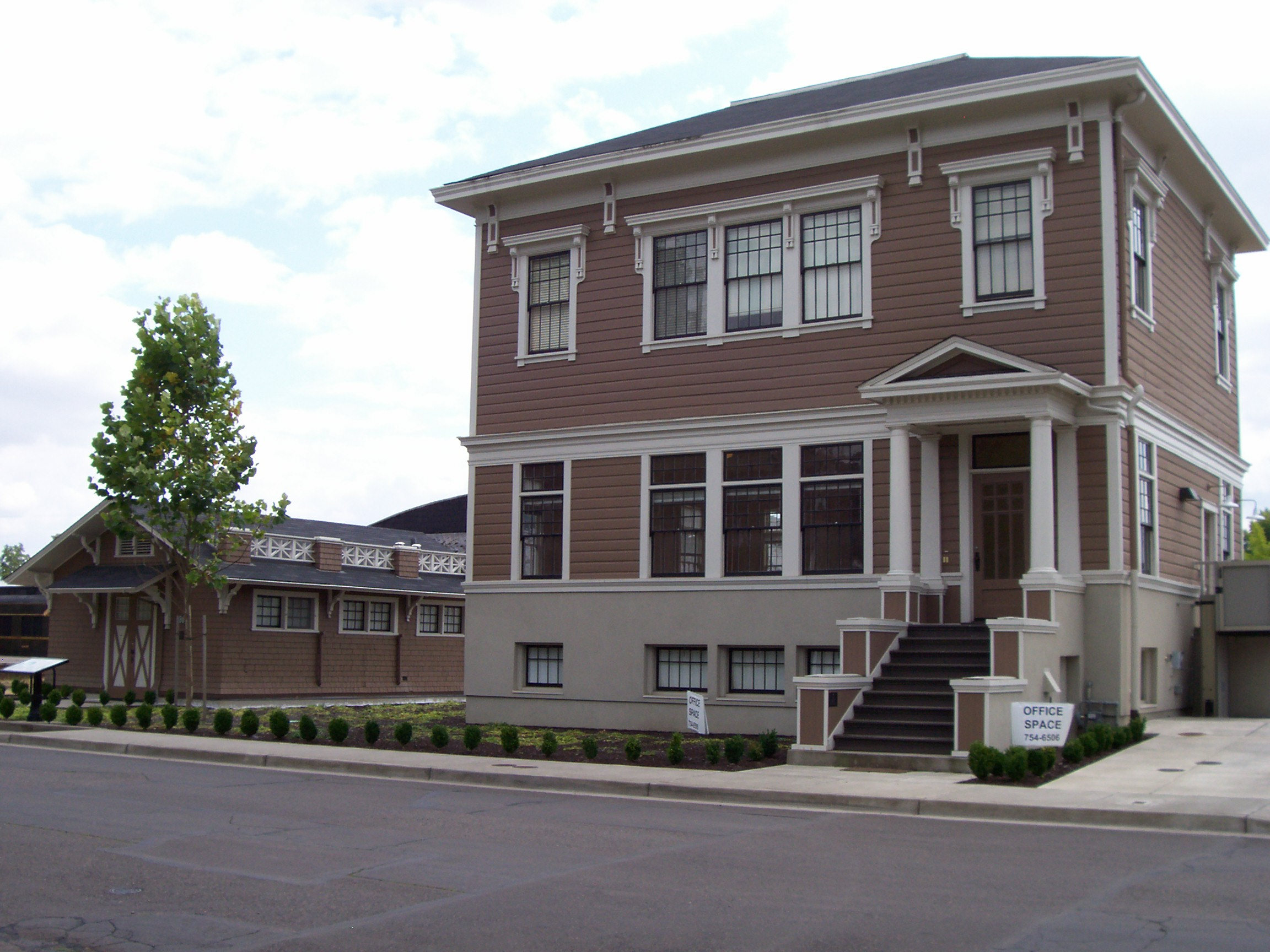

- Location within Oregon Location within the United States
- Location: 800 SW Washington Ave; Corvallis, Oregon, U.S.
- Coordinates: 44.561667°N 123.266944°W
- Architect: John Virginius Bennes; D.C. Schell
- Architectural style: Queen Anne; Classical Revival
- NRHP reference No.: 06000725
- Added to NRHP: August 16, 2006

The Poultry Building and Incubator House is a house located on the Oregon State University campus in Corvallis, Oregon, designed by prominent architect John Virginius Bennes. The house is registered on the National Register for Historic Places.

== See also ==
- National Register of Historic Places listings in Benton County, Oregon
