= Page and Son Apartments =

Historic building in Portland, Oregon, U.S.

- U.S. National Register of Historic Places
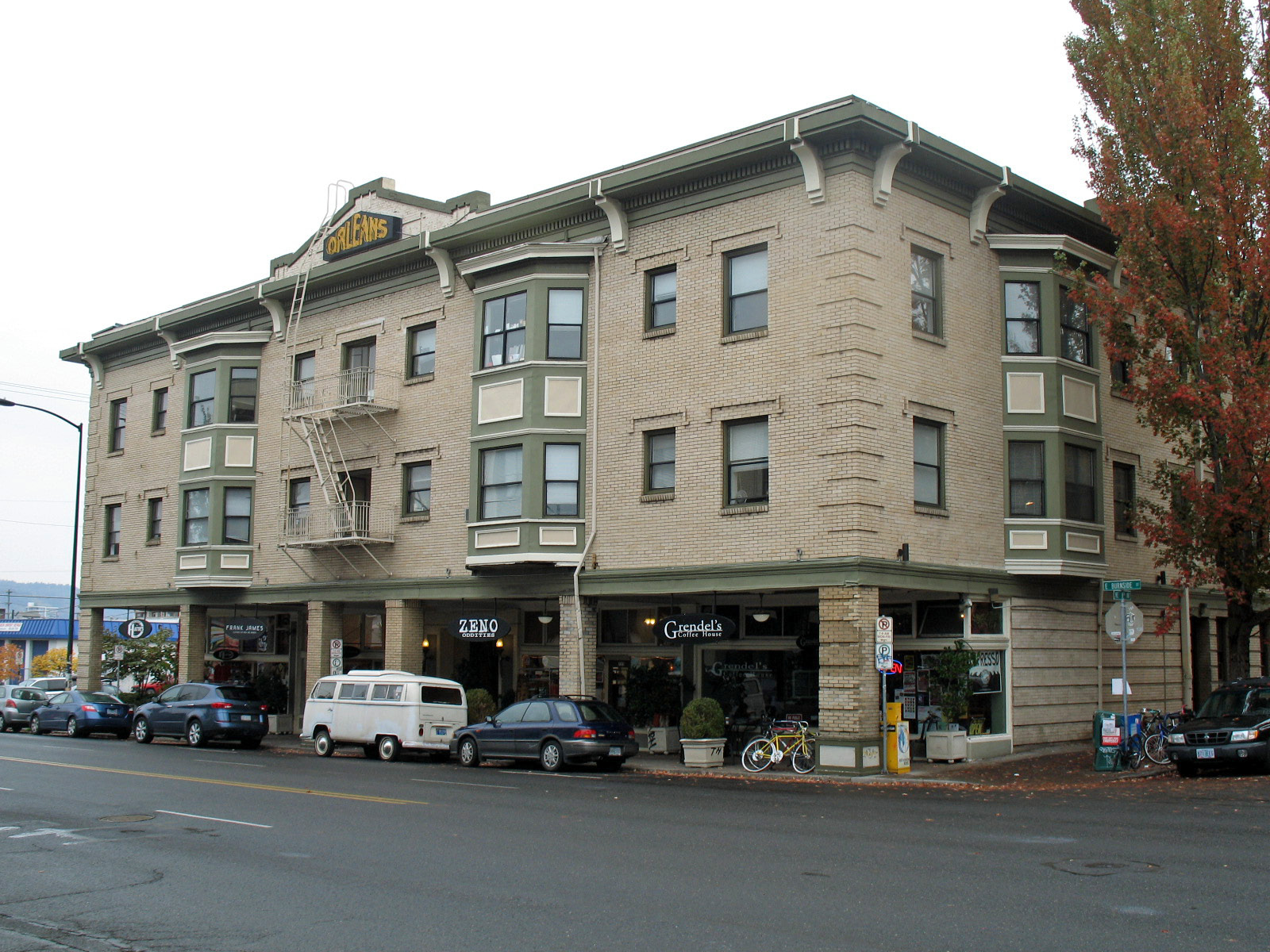

- Location within Portland, Oregon Location within Oregon Location within the United States
- Location: 723–737 E. Burnside Street; Portland, Oregon, U.S.
- Coordinates: 45.522767°N 122.657572°W
- Architect: John Virginius Bennes
- NRHP reference No.: 89000113
- Added to NRHP: March 8, 1989

The Page and Son Apartments is a tenement building located in Portland, Oregon designed by prominent architect John Virginius Bennes. The structure is listed on the National Register for Historic Places.

== See also ==
- National Register of Historic Places listings in Northeast Portland, Oregon
