= Liberty Theatre (Astoria, Oregon) =

- Astor Building
- U.S. National Register of Historic Places
- U.S. Historic district – Contributing property
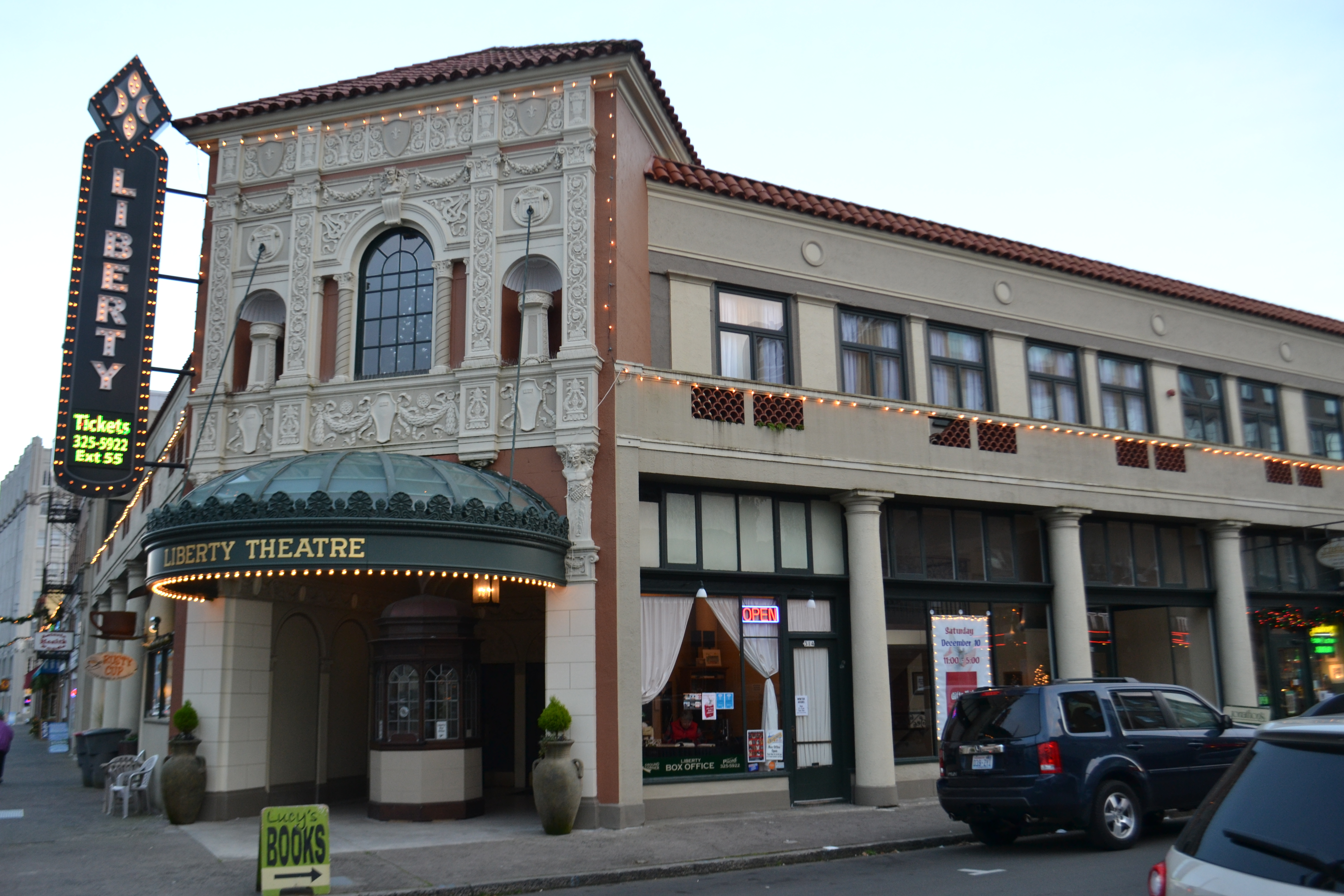
- The Astor Building in 2011

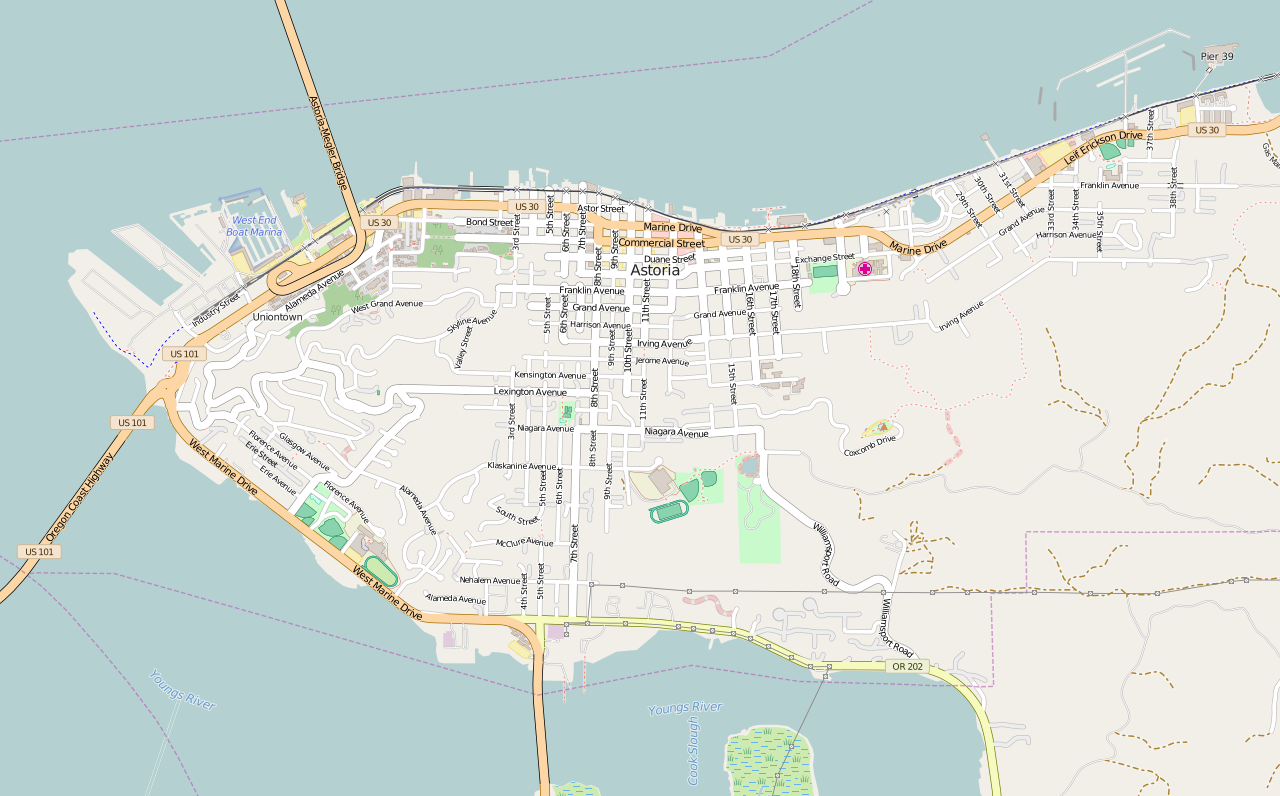
- Location within Astoria OR Location within Oregon Location within the United States
- Location: 1203 Commercial Street; Astoria, Oregon
- Coordinates: 46°11′19″N 123°49′48″W
- Area: 0.21 acres (0.085 ha)
- Built: 1924–1925
- Architect: Bennes and Herzog
- Artist: Joseph Knowles (painter)
- Architectural style: Italian Renaissance
- Part of: Astoria Downtown Historic District (ID98000631)
- NRHP reference No.: 84002938
- Added to NRHP: September 7, 1984

The Liberty Theatre is a historic vaudeville theater and cinema in Astoria, Oregon, United States. The whole commercial building of which the theater is the major occupant is also known as the Astor Building, especially in the context of historic preservation.

== History ==
Opened in 1925 as the first theater to be re-established after the destruction of the Astoria fire of 1922, the Liberty Theatre was seen as symbolizing the city's rebirth. Its Italian Renaissance architectural and decorative style was unique among Astoria's commercial buildings and stood out from the rest of the post-fire reconstruction. Notably, the auditorium features a set of 12 mural-style oil-on-canvas paintings depicting Venetian canal scenes by local artist Joseph Knowles, extending the Mediterranean atmosphere of the architecture. The building was built for the theater chain of Claude Jensen and John von Herberg, one of over thirty venues they operated throughout the Pacific Northwest, and was designed by the Portland architectural firm of Bennes and Herzog. (Note: Multiple other theaters were built through the same owner-architect association, including the Hollywood Theatre (1926) and Bagdad Theatre (1927) in Portland. Both Portland theaters are also listed on the National Register.)

The building was added to the National Register of Historic Places in 1984 using the Astor Building name.

== See also ==
- National Register of Historic Places listings in Clatsop County, Oregon
