= Abraham Tichner House =

Historic building in Portland, Oregon, U.S.

- U.S. National Register of Historic Places
- Portland Historic Landmark
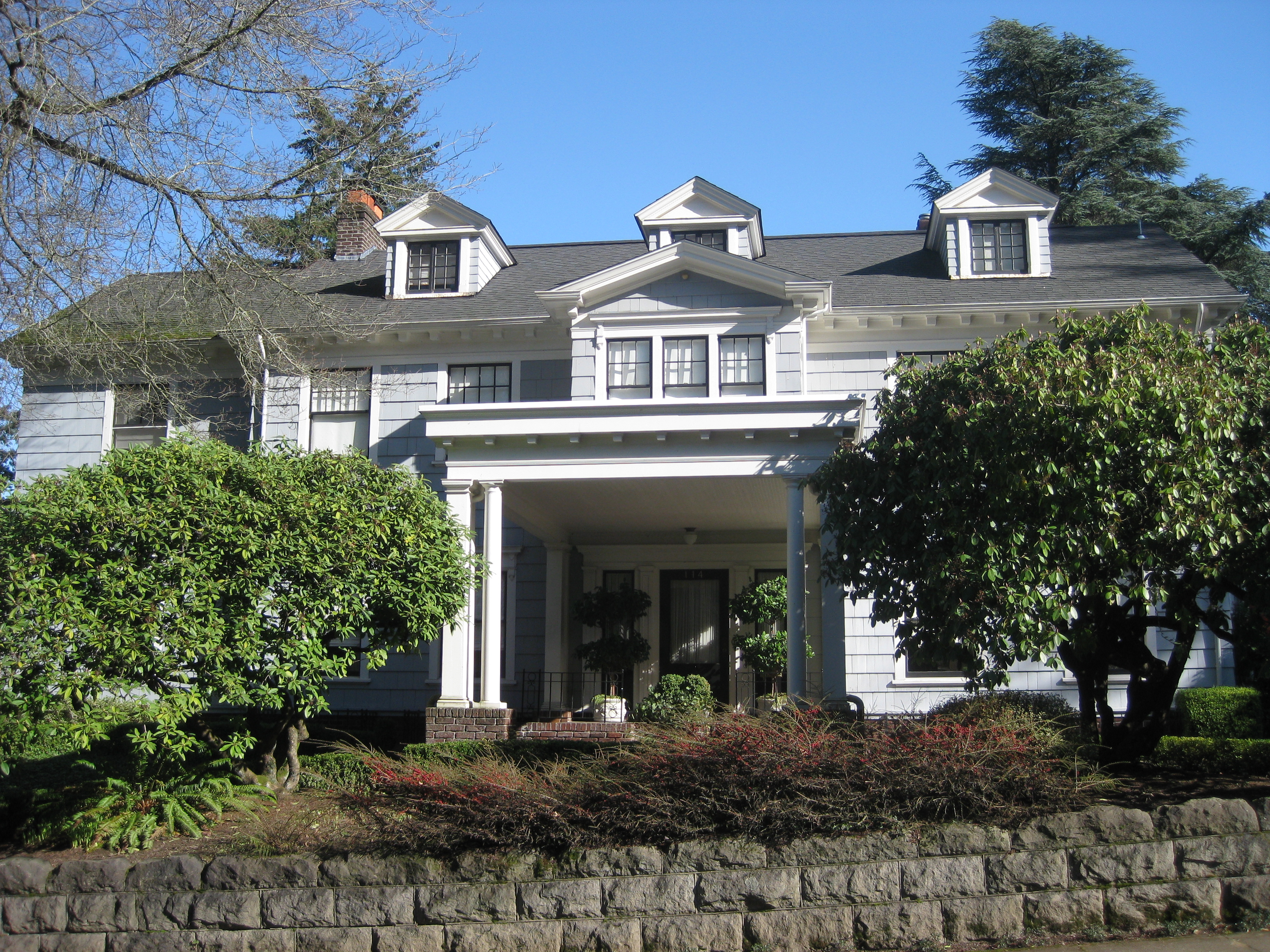
- Abraham Tichner House in 2010

- Location within Portland, Oregon
- Location: 114 SW Kingston Avenue; Portland, Oregon
- Coordinates: 45°31′24″N 122°42′23″W
- Built: 1915
- Architect: John Virginius Bennes
- Architectural style: Classical Revival
- NRHP reference No.: 00001022
- Added to NRHP: August 23, 2000

The Abraham Tichner House is a house located in southwest Portland, Oregon listed on the National Register of Historic Places.

== See also ==
- National Register of Historic Places listings in Southwest Portland, Oregon
