= Broadway Hotel (Portland, Oregon) =

Historic building in Portland, Oregon, U.S.

- U.S. National Register of Historic Places
- Portland Historic Landmark
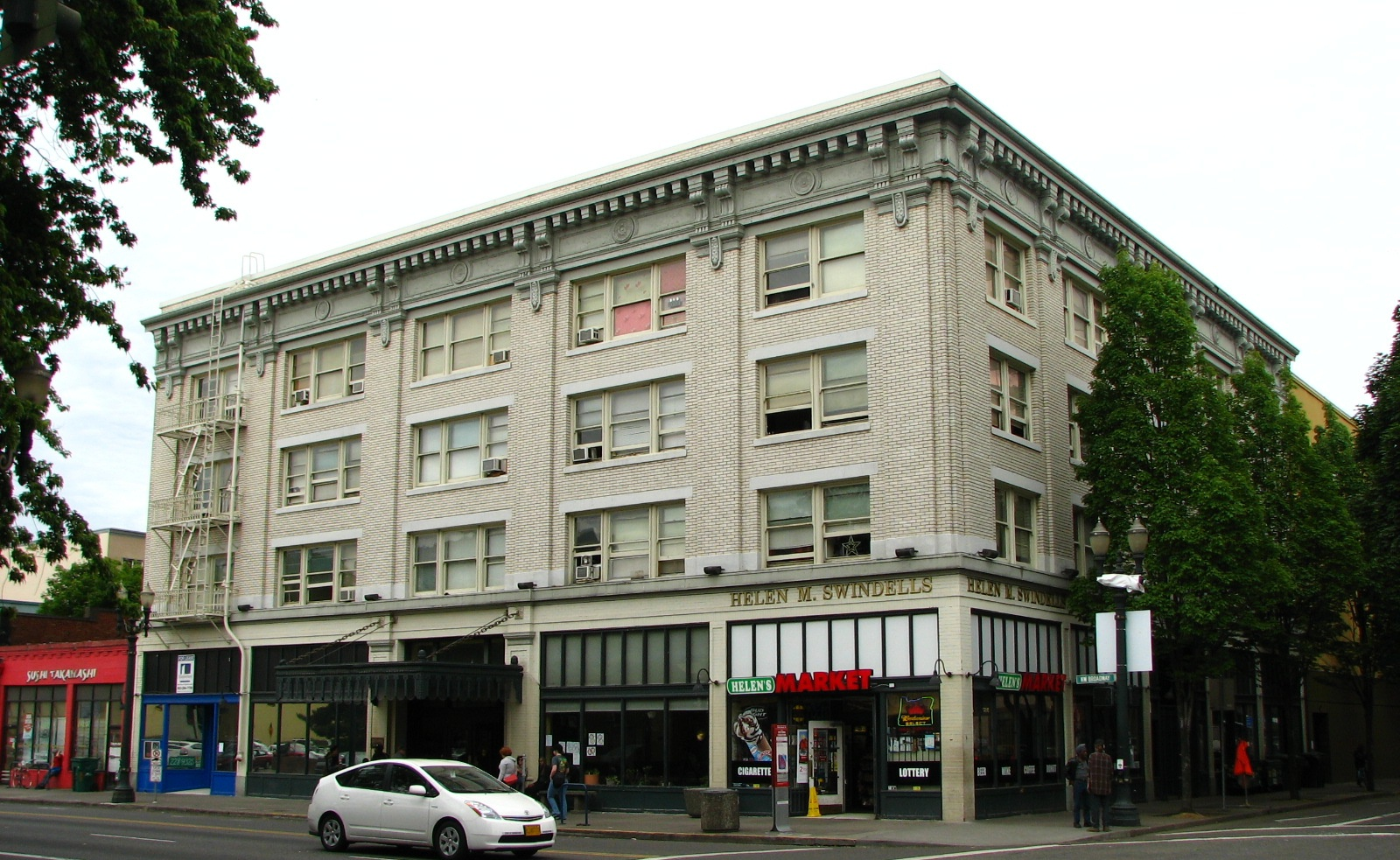
- View from the southwest, across West Burnside Street

- Location within Portland, Oregon
- Location: 10 NW Broadway; Portland, Oregon
- Coordinates: 45°31′24″N 122°40′38″W
- Built: 1913
- Architect: Bennes and Hendricks
- Architectural style: Early Commercial
- NRHP reference No.: 93000927
- Added to NRHP: September 9, 1993

The Broadway Hotel is a historic hotel building located in Portland, Oregon, built in 1913. As of 2009, it was managed as single room occupancy apartments under the name Helen M. Swindell Apartments. It is listed on the National Register of Historic Places. It was designed by Portland architect John Virginius Bennes's Bennes and Hendricks firm.

== See also ==
- National Register of Historic Places listings in Northwest Portland, Oregon
