= H. Liebes and Company Building =

Historic building in Portland, Oregon, U.S.

- U.S. National Register of Historic Places
- Portland Historic Landmark
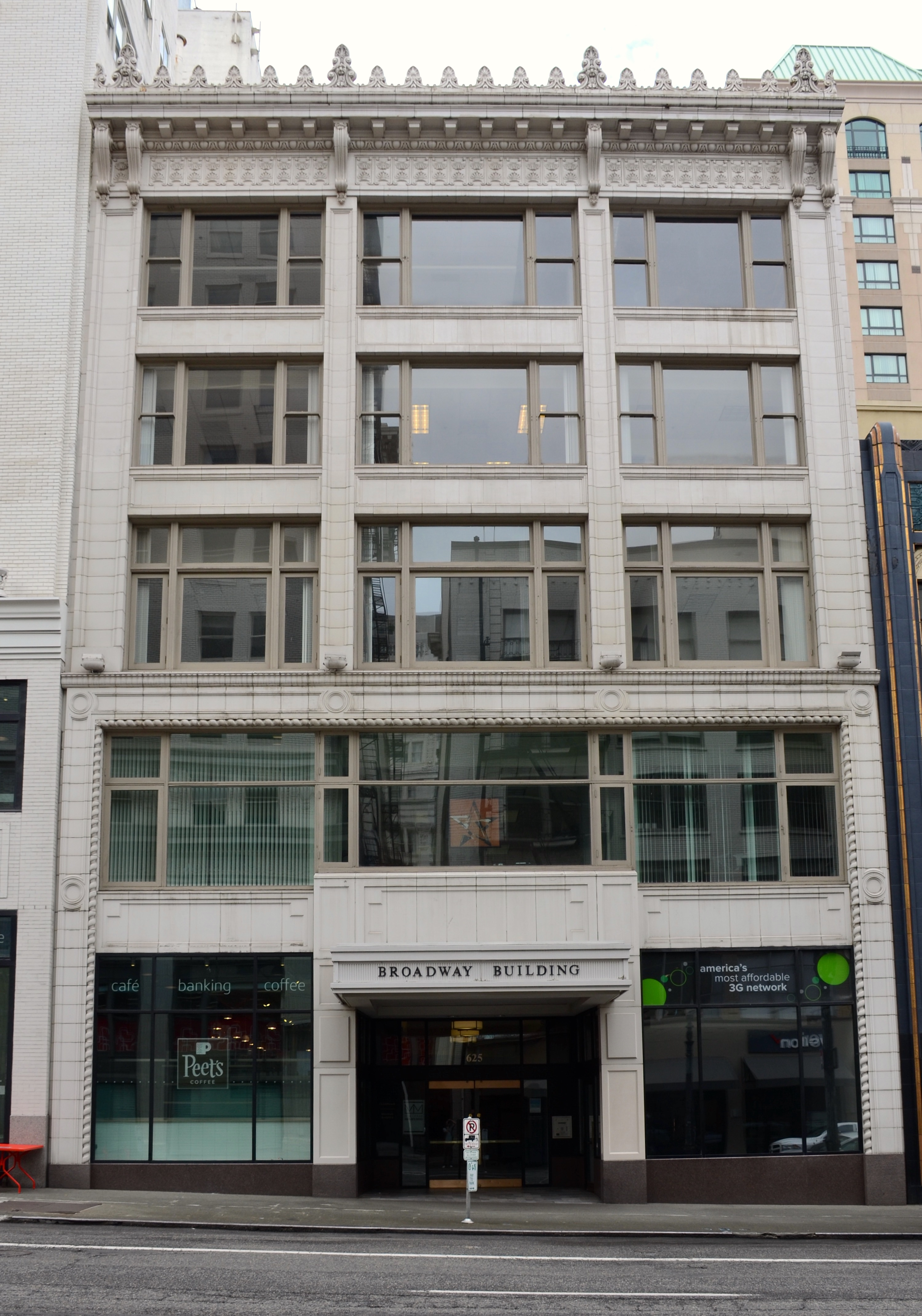
- Main façade in 2021

- Location within Portland, Oregon Location within Oregon Location within the United States
- Location: 625 SW Broadway; Portland, Oregon
- Coordinates: 45°31′11″N 122°40′47″W
- Built: 1917
- Architect: John V. Bennes
- Architectural style: Chicago, Early Commercial
- NRHP reference No.: 96000993
- Added to NRHP: September 12, 1996

The H. Liebes and Company Building is a commercial building located at 625 SW Broadway in southwest Portland, Oregon. It was listed on the National Register of Historic Places on September 12, 1996.

The building was designed by John Virginius Bennes.

== See also ==
- National Register of Historic Places listings in Southwest Portland, Oregon
