= Portland Latin American Film Festival =

Annual event in Portland, Oregon, U.S.

- Status: Active
- Frequency: Annually
- Location: Portland, Oregon
- Country: United States
- Inaugurated: 2007

The Portland Latin American Film Festival (PLAFF) is an annual film festival in Portland, Oregon, United States. It is hosted by the Hollywood Theatre. According to KATU, the festival "is dedicated to showcasing perspectives of Latin American culture through an exploration of Latin film and increasing the visibility of Latin American cinema locally".

== History ==
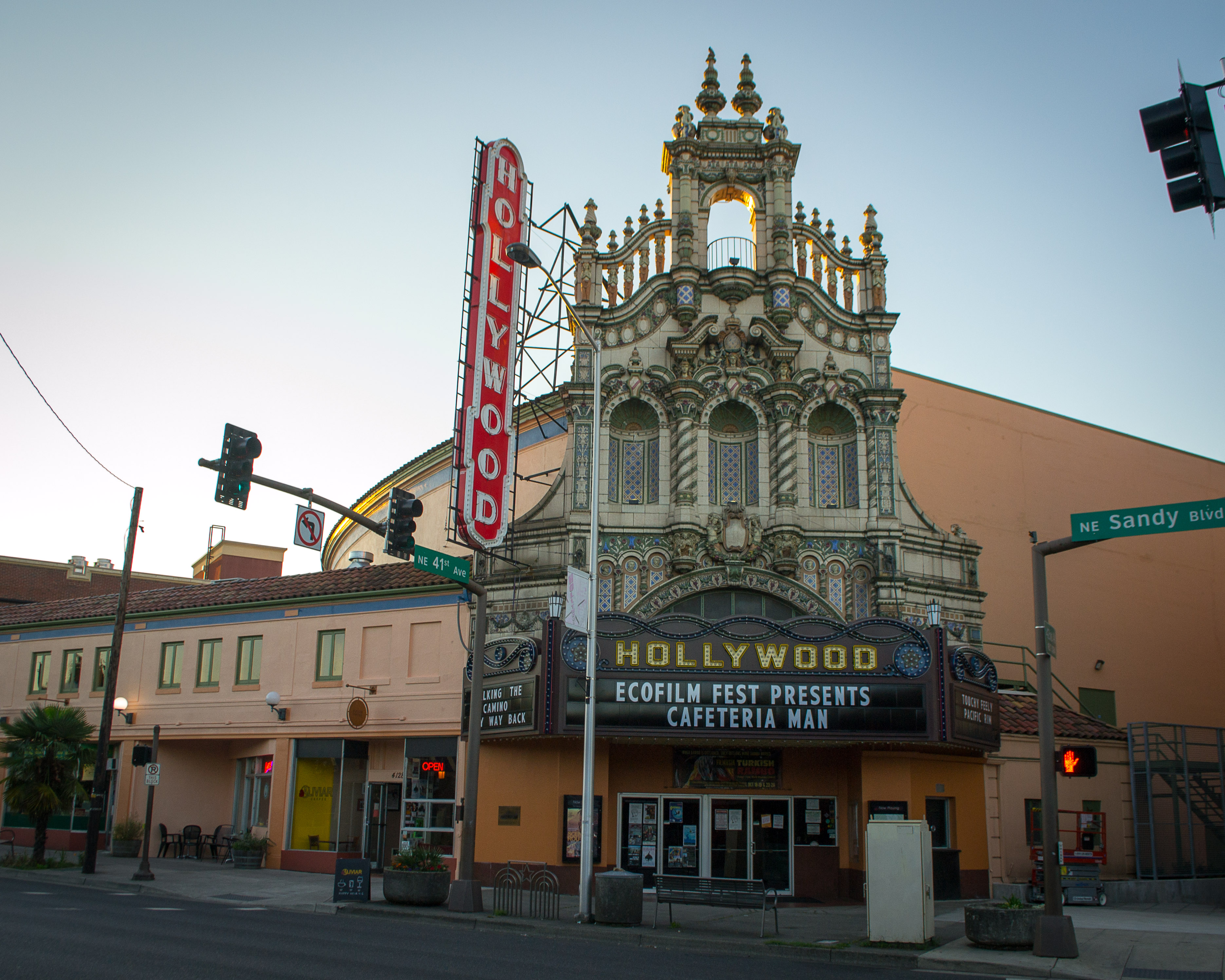
Exterior of the Hollywood Theatre, which hosts the film festival.

Established by Maria Osterroth and Judah Sussman, the first event was held in 2007. Early venues included Whitsell Auditorium, Living Room Theaters, and the Broadway Metroplex, before Hollywood Theatre became the host.

The 2022 event featured six feature films and a short documentary, as well as an event with director Raúl Ramón and actor Roberto Sosa at Hey Love. The 2023 festival had 30 film screenings. Eight films were screened in 2024, including Boca Chica (2023) and Los Frikis (2024). The 2025 event featured eleven films, including Autos, Mota, y Rocanrol and No Nos Moverán. The 2026 festival had 13 films representing 16 countries on 12 screening dates.

== Reception ==
Oregon ArtsWatch has said the festival "may not have as high a profile as it deserves due to its intermittent nature".

== See also ==
- Cinema of Latin America
- Culture of Portland, Oregon
- Hispanics and Latinos in Portland, Oregon
- List of festivals in the United States
- List of film festivals
