= Hamilton Hotel (Portland, Oregon) =

Hotel in Portland, Oregon, United States

Coordinates: 45.515822°N 122.67629°W

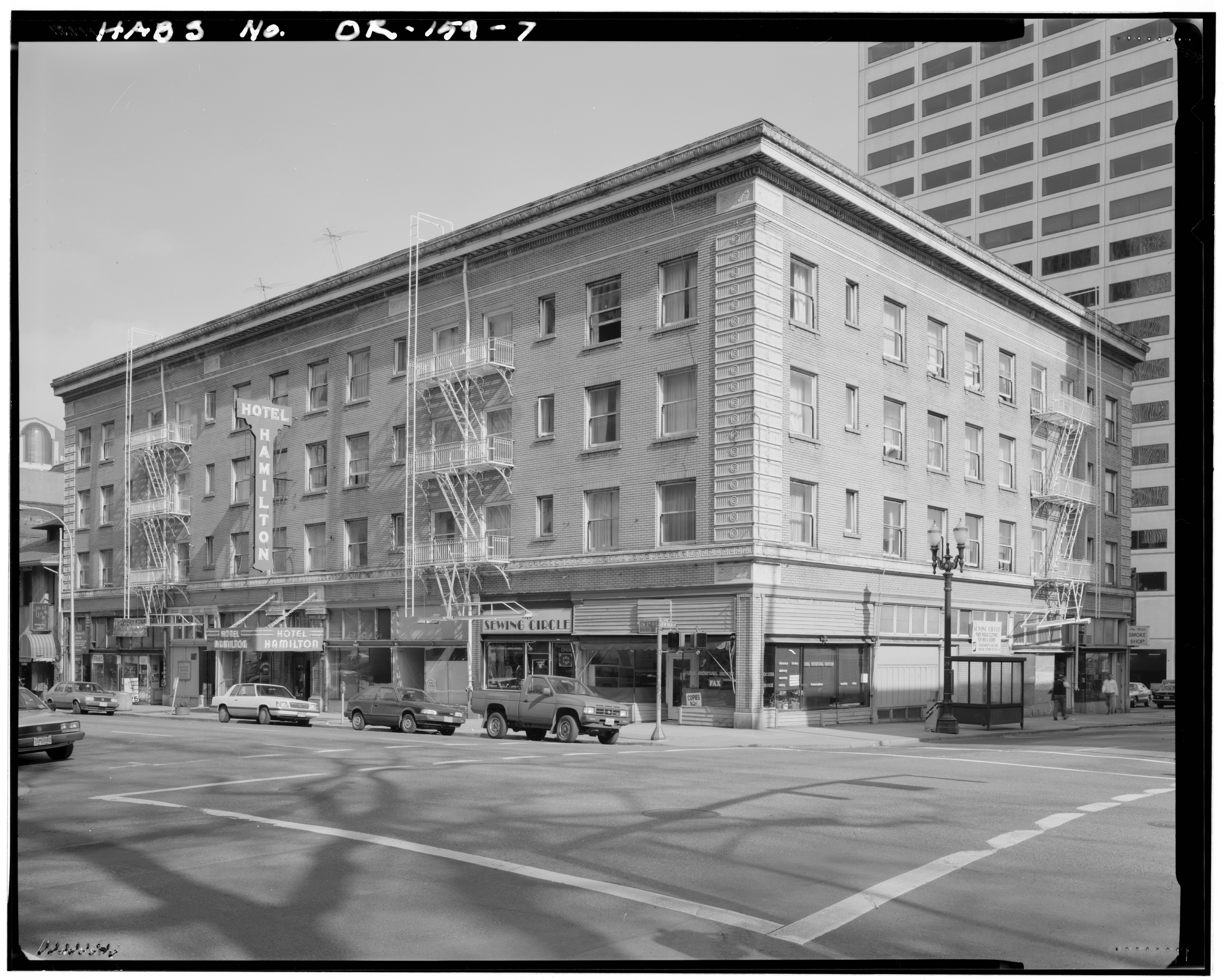
Hamilton Hotel in Portland, Oregon (1993).

The Hamilton Hotel in Portland, Oregon, originally the Venable, was designed by Portland architect John V. Bennes's Bennes & Hendricks firm and built in 1913. It was four stories and in the Classic Revival Commercial Style.

== History ==
It was included in the Historic American Buildings Survey carried out by the National Park Service in March 1993. The Survey stated it was "significant as an example of its architectural style and building type associated with low-income urban dwelling, and because of its association with its designer, noted Portland Architect, John V. Bennes. The Hotel represents development in Portland, during an era of rapid urban expansion."

An arson fire at the hotel in 1980 caused the death of 69-year-old Marie Chin, a hotel tenant. It was scheduled to close in May 1993, then demolished by the Federal Government to make way for the Mark O. Hatfield United States Courthouse. It was located at 1024 SW 3rd Avenue.

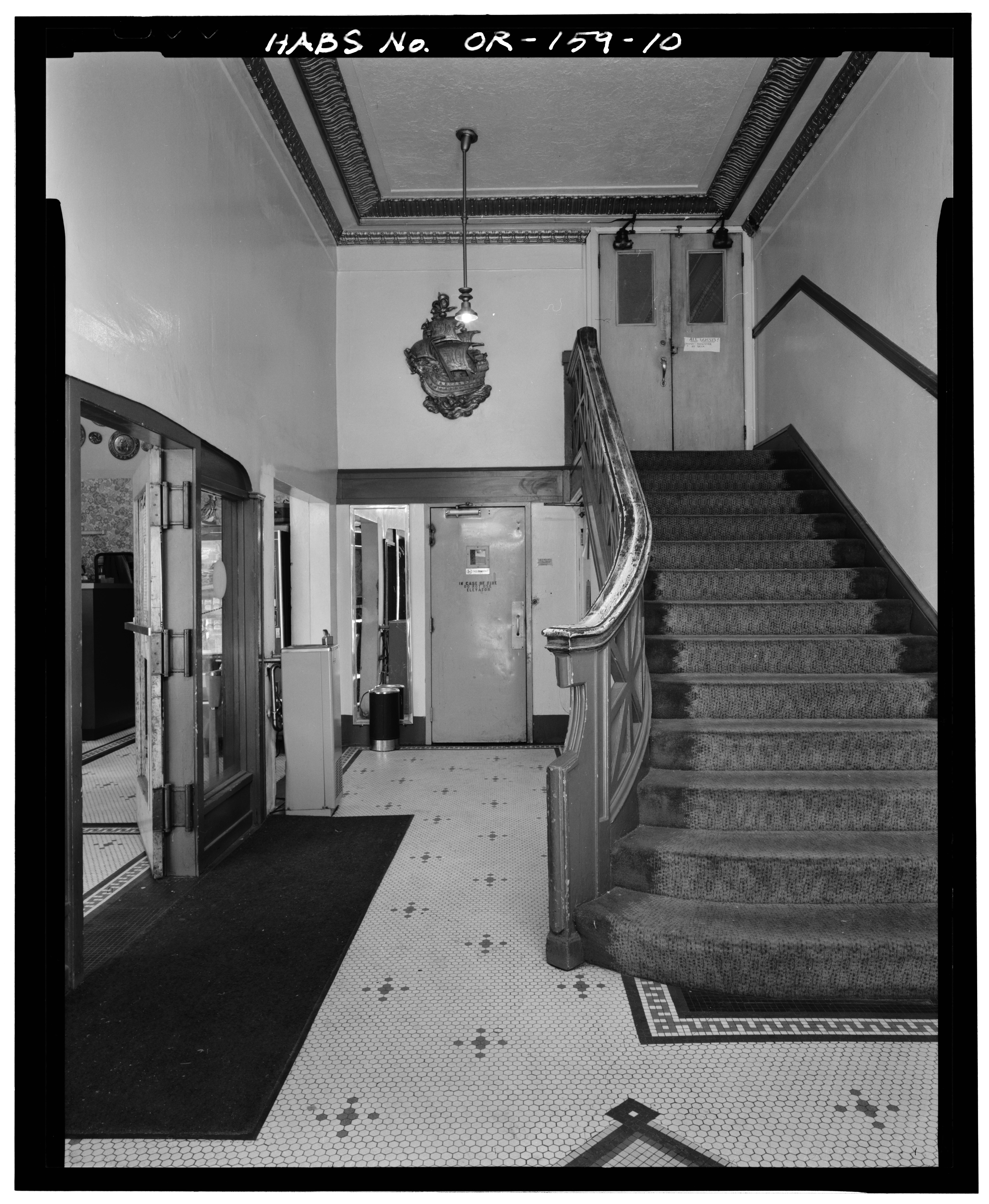
Lobby foyer and stairs
