= Pacific Hardware & Steel Company Warehouse =

Historic building in Portland, Oregon, U.S.

- U.S. National Register of Historic Places
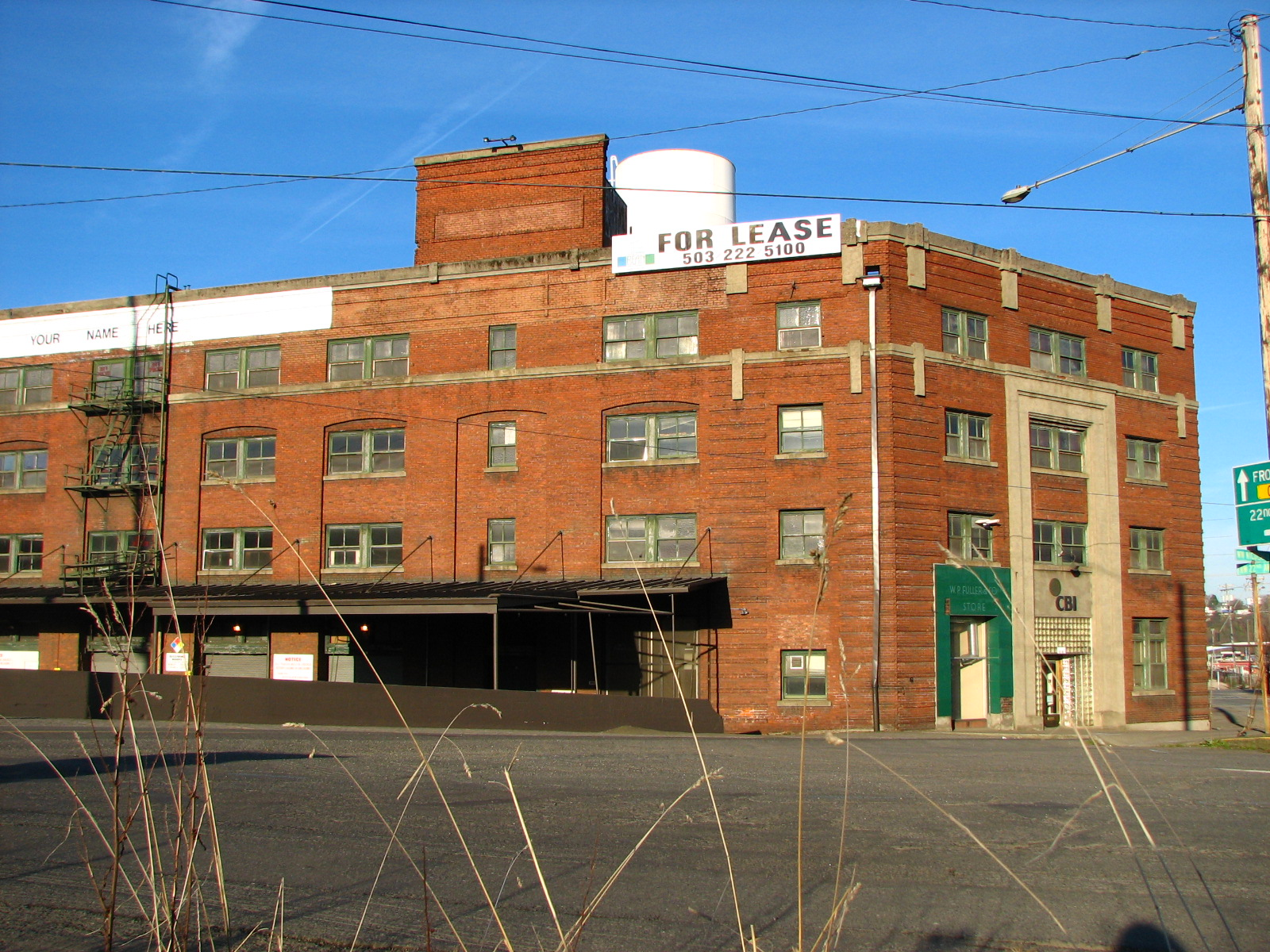

- Location within Portland, Oregon
- Location: 2181 NW Nicolai St. Portland, Oregon, U.S.
- Coordinates: 45.541138°N 122.698123°W
- Built: 1911
- Architect: John Virginius Bennes
- NRHP reference No.: 08001263
- Added to NRHP: December 31, 2008

The Pacific Hardware & Steel Company Warehouse is an industrial building located in Northwest Portland, Oregon designed by prominent architect John Virginius Bennes. The building is registered on the National Register for Historic Places.

== See also ==
- National Register of Historic Places listings in Northwest Portland, Oregon
