= L. B. Menefee House =

Historic building in Portland, Oregon, U.S.

- L.B. Menefee House
- U.S. National Register of Historic Places
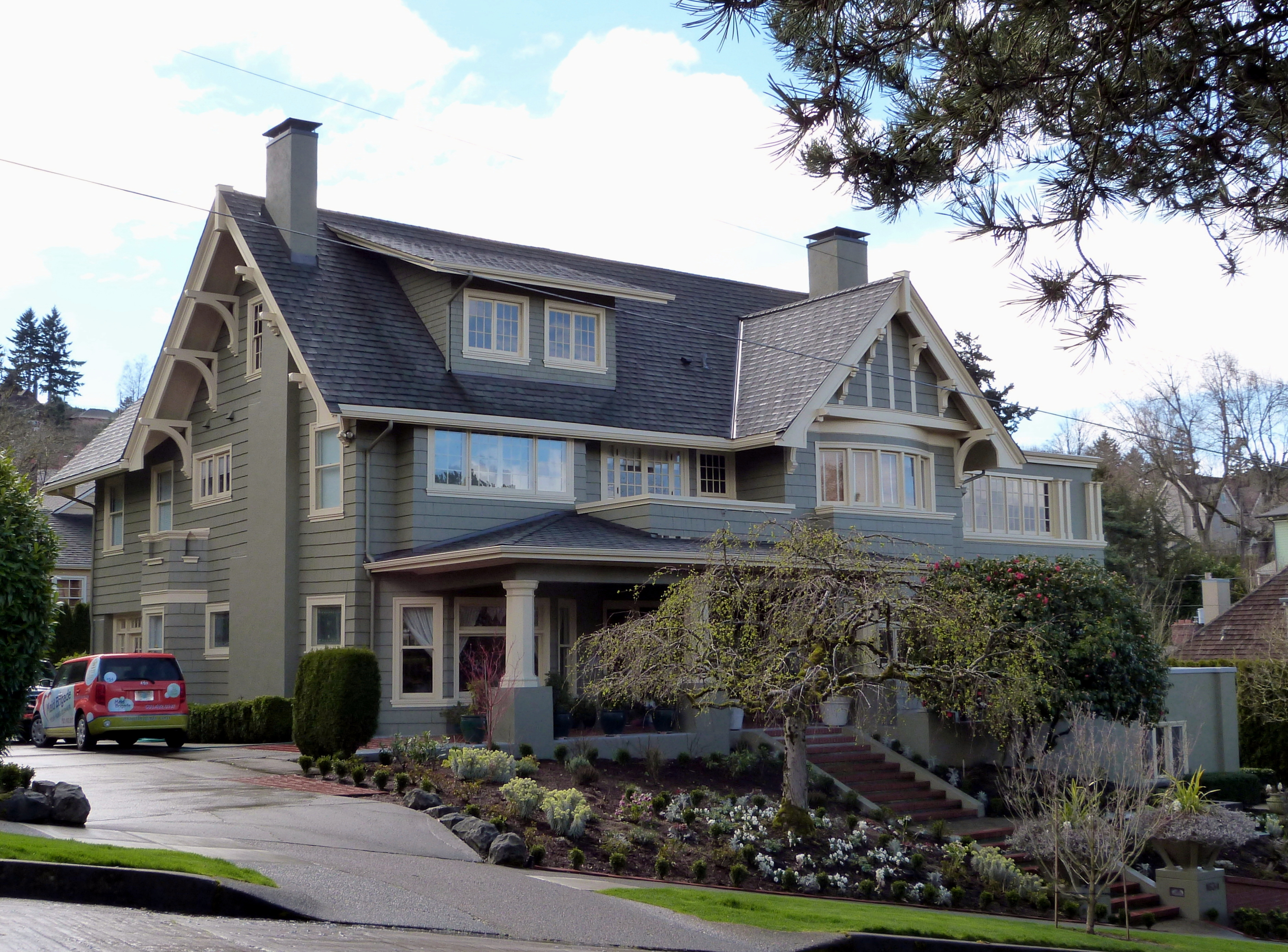

- Location within Portland, Oregon Location within Oregon Location within the United States
- Location: 1634 SW. Myrtle St. Portland, Oregon, U.S.
- Coordinates: 45.510192°N 122.694772°W
- Built: 1900
- Architect: John Virginius Bennes
- Architectural style: Tudor Revival
- NRHP reference No.: 89001866
- Added to NRHP: 1989

The L.B. Menefee House is a house located in the Portland Heights neighborhood of Portland, Oregon designed by prominent architect John Virginius Bennes. The house is registered on the National Register for Historic Places. The house was originally designated to house the archbishop of the Roman Catholic Archdiocese of Portland, Oregon.

== See also ==
- National Register of Historic Places listings in Southwest Portland, Oregon
