= Baker City Tower =

Historic building in Baker City, Oregon, United States

Baker Tower
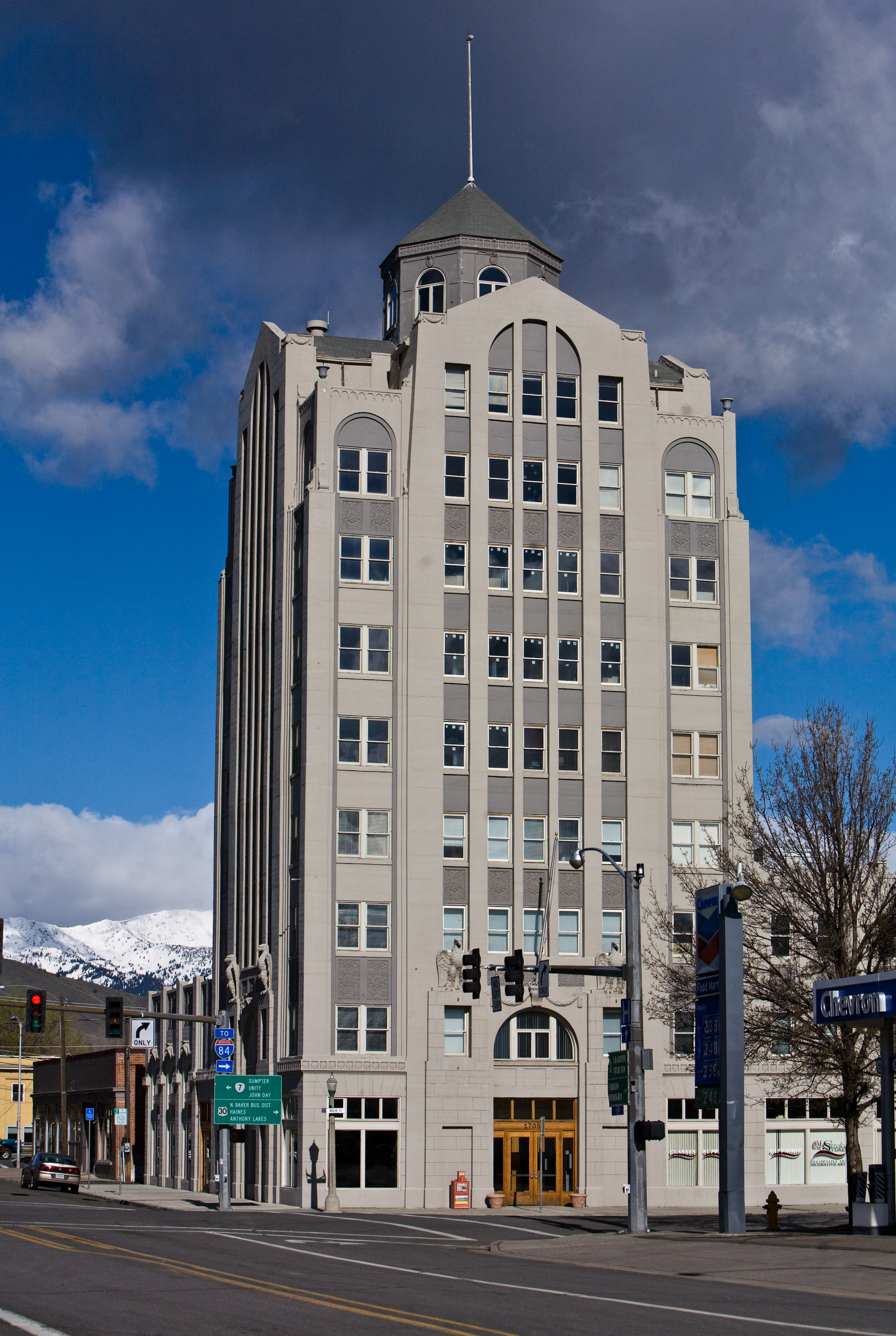
- The building's exterior in 2009
- Interactive map of the Baker Tower area
- Former names: Baker Community Hotel; Baker Hotel
- Alternative names: Baker City Tower

General information
- Opened: August 24, 1929
- Cost: $320,000

Height
- Height: 144 feet (44 m)

Technical details
- Floor count: Nine, plus basement and rooftop cupola

Website
- bakertower.com
- Baker Hotel
- U.S. Historic district – Contributing property
- Location within Oregon Location within the United States
- Location: 1701 Main Street; Baker City, Oregon
- Coordinates: 44°46′29.1″N 117°49′48.7″W
- Built: 1929
- Built by: John Almeter
- Architect: Tourtellotte & Hummel
- Architectural style: Art Deco
- Part of: Baker Historic District (ID78002277)
- Designated CP: December 14, 1978

Baker City Tower or Baker Tower (originally Baker Community Hotel, then Baker Hotel) is the tallest building east of the Cascade Range in the U.S. state of Oregon, located in Baker City. It was constructed in 1929 in the Art Deco style and is nine stories high. It is part of the Baker Historic District and listed in the National Register of Historic Places. It was designed by the Portland office of architectural firm Tourtellotte & Hummel. The general contractor was John Almeter of Portland and the roofing contractor was Cook & Emele of Baker City.

== Early history ==
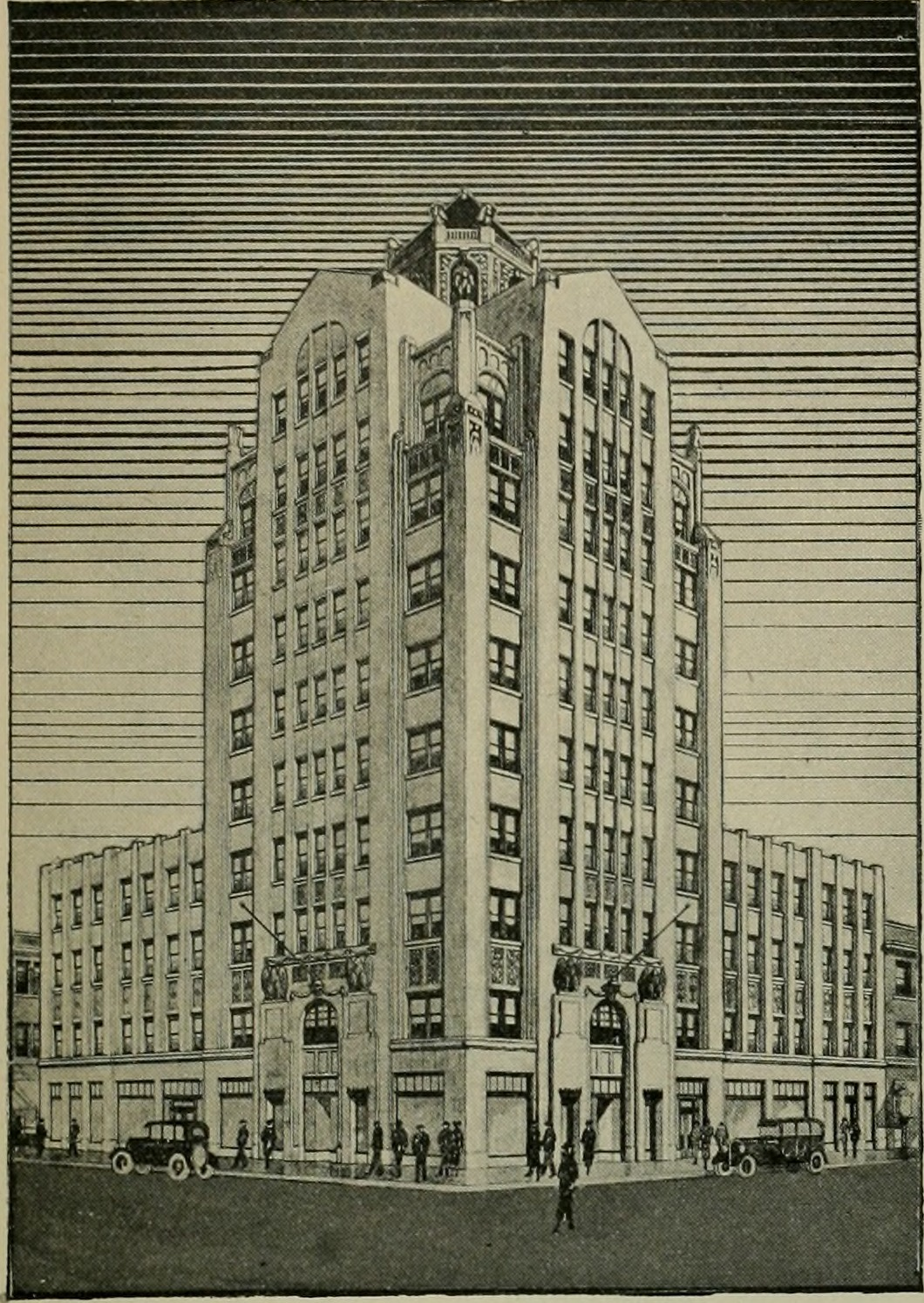
The building in 1930

An earlier building on the site housed the first livery stable in Baker, but it was demolished to make way for the hotel. The building is constructed of concrete and has its main entrance on Main Street, with an auxiliary entrance on Auburn Avenue. The roof is topped with an eight-sided cupola, with a matching octagonal hip roof with a flagpole. The cupola was designed as an observation center, from which the Powder River Basin and Elkhorn Mountains can be seen. The original windows were double-hung wood sashes. Decorative elements included concrete garlands and scrolls, pairs of 4-foot (1.2 m) terra cotta eagles at the entrances, and urns at the corners of the eighth floor.

The hotel was built to serve long-distance automobile travelers who were becoming common in the 1920s, and it did not need to be located near the railroad tracks. It was planned as a community hotel, both a community asset and an investment. Local ownership meant that the community was "financially and emotionally involved in the project's success". The hotel was originally owned by 300 local residents who purchased stock shares, priced affordably to be within reach of many residents, and survived the Great Depression without losses to the owners of their investment. It was near default on its mortgage obligations and petitioned for bankruptcy reorganization in 1936, but bond-holders rejected the plan. The debt was refinanced and reduced, in part with a loan from the Reconstruction Finance Corporation. Interest payments were reduced by 50 percent and the hotel remained solvent. National conventions were held in the hotel, which had a reputation as "the finest place to dine in eastern Oregon". The original stockholders sold the building in 1946 after more than 60 percent of them agreed to a sale, at which time the word "community" was dropped from the name.

== Conversion ==
The building was originally an 82-room hotel and operated as one from its opening on August 24, 1929, until the late 1960s before being closed and sold in a foreclosure auction. Its owner since 1961, A.C Lighthall, had sold it twice to owners who continued to operate it as a hotel, but both lost it by failing to make the payments. Lighthall then closed it on January 1, 1969. It remained vacant for almost two years, then was resold to a local investor who believed it was the "largest and finest building in all Baker". It was converted to restaurant/retail/office usage on the first, second, ninth and tenth floors and apartments on other floors in 1972. Eleven rooms on the second floor remained nightly rental hotel rooms. The remainder of the rooms were made into one or two bedroom apartments.

In 1992, the building was "run-down" and a $1.2 million restoration was performed to convert it to senior housing.

A 1999 renovation brought a new elevator, HVAC system, fire sprinklers, windows. Later work brought restoration of art deco detailing and fiber-optic wiring enabling it to be marketed as high-tech office space. After the 2001 renovation, the building was configured with retail and office space on floors one through five, with the upper floors residential condominiums.

== Other ==
Cast and crew of the 1969 musical film Paint Your Wagon, starring Lee Marvin and Clint Eastwood, stayed at the hotel during filming which occurred near Baker City. The hotel was nearly fully booked just before its permanent closure after the movie production ended.
