= William Bittle Wells House =

Historic building in Portland, Oregon, U.S.

- U.S. National Register of Historic Places
- Portland Historic Landmark
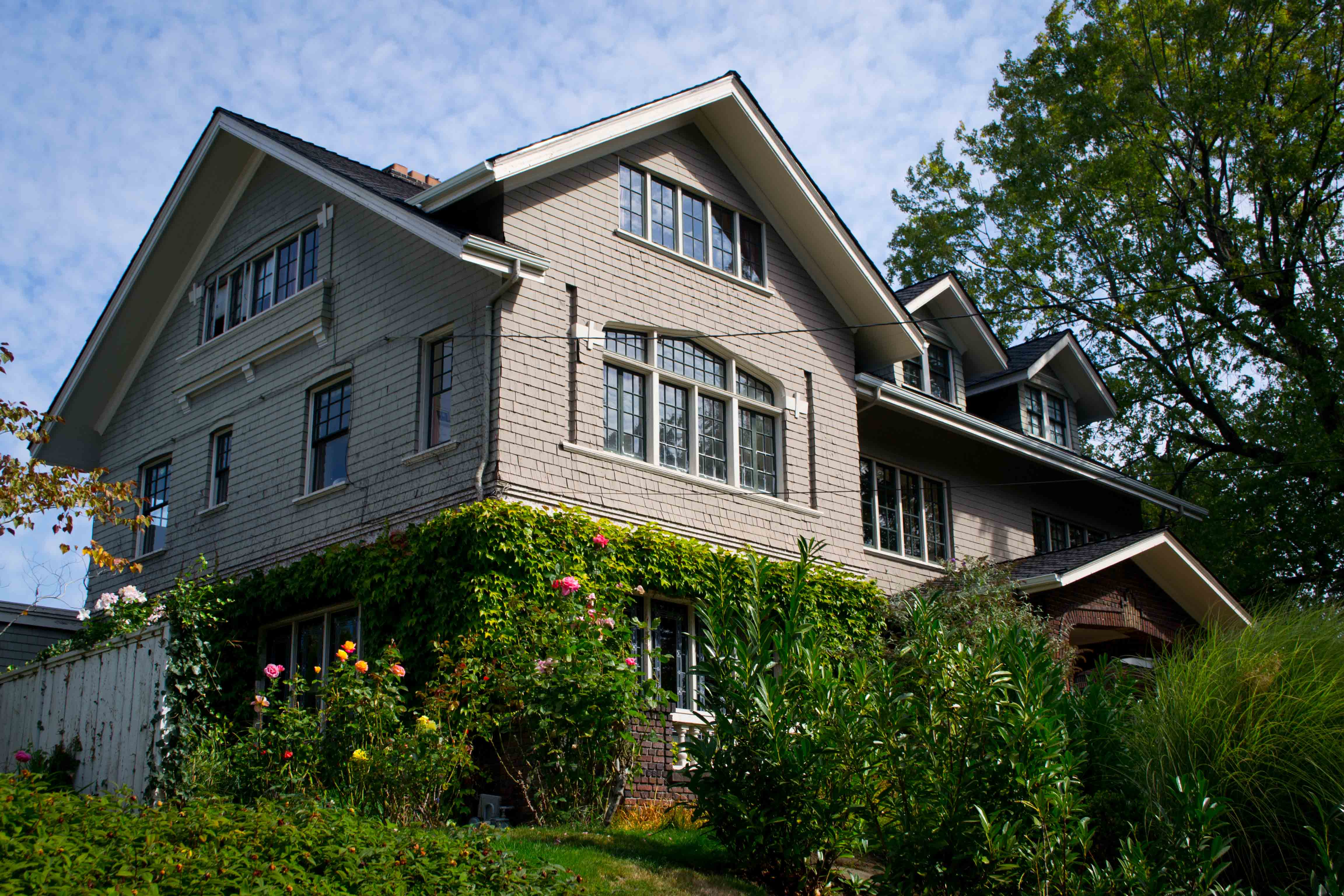
- The Wells House in 2012

- Location within Portland, Oregon
- Location: 1515 SW Clifton Street; Portland, Oregon
- Coordinates: 45°30′40″N 122°41′35″W
- Area: 0.3 acres (0.12 ha)
- Built: 1910
- Architect: Bennes, Hendricks & Thompson
- Architectural style: Bungalow/Craftsman
- NRHP reference No.: 89000519
- Added to NRHP: June 16, 1989

The William Bittle Wells House is a house located in southwest Portland, Oregon listed on the National Register of Historic Places.

Wells was the founder and editor of The Pacific Monthly until he sold it in 1906.

== See also ==
- National Register of Historic Places listings in Southwest Portland, Oregon
