= Inlow Hall (Eastern Oregon University) =

- Administration Building
- U.S. National Register of Historic Places
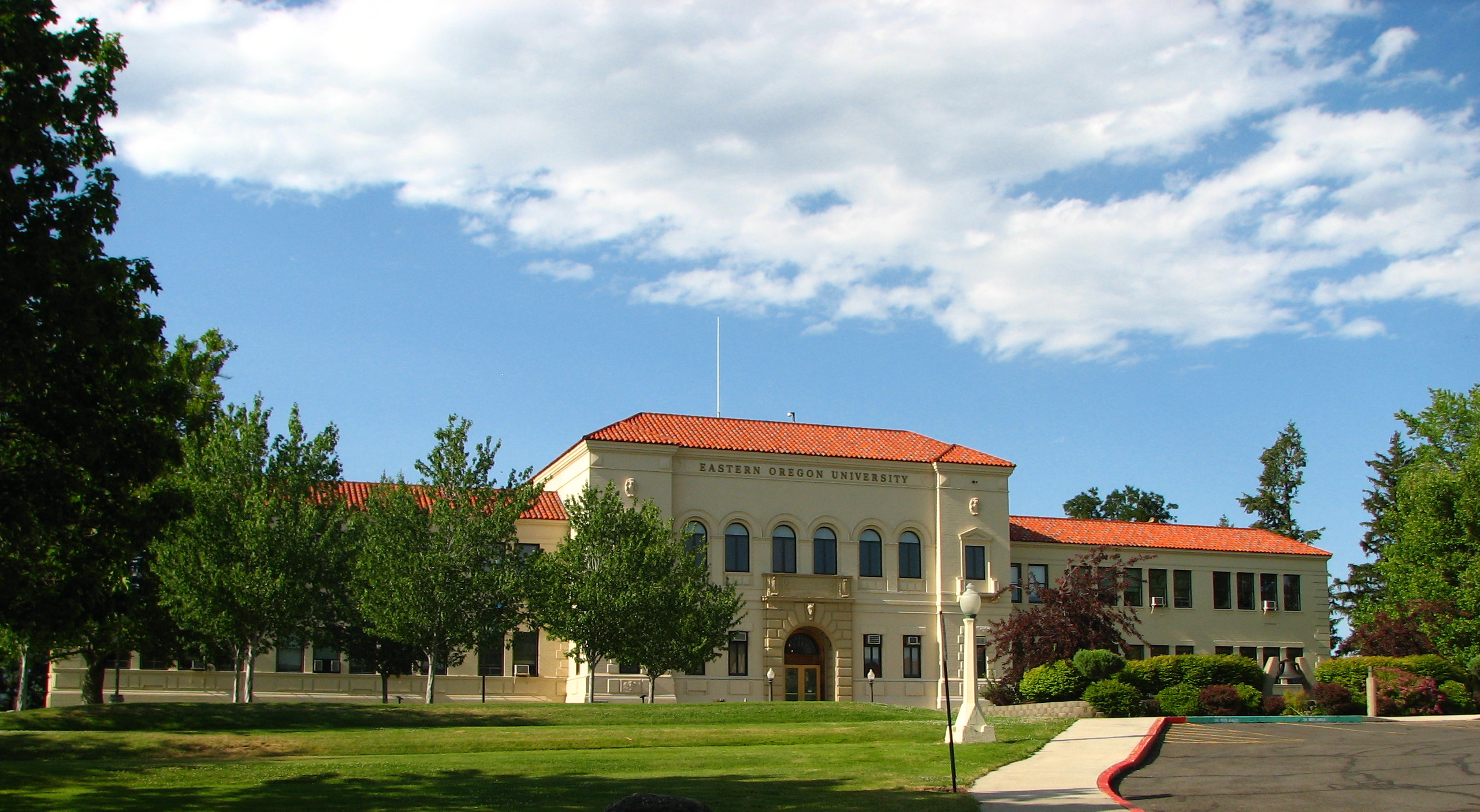
- South elevation of the Administration Building (Inlow Hall) in 2009.

- Location within Oregon
- Location: Eastern Oregon University campus, La Grande, Oregon
- Coordinates: 45°19′17″N 118°05′25″W
- Built: 1929
- Architect: John V. Bennes (Bennes & Herzog)
- Architectural style: Renaissance Revival
- NRHP reference No.: 80003384
- Added to NRHP: February 27, 1980

Inlow Hall, the administration building at Eastern Oregon University in La Grande, Oregon, United States, was built in 1929. It was listed on the National Register of Historic Places as the Administration Building in 1980.

It was built originally as the Eastern Oregon State Normal School. The building "is a modern adaptation of Italian Renaissance palatial architecture and includes a formal grand stair with overlook terrace. Originally,... it housed all functions appropriate to a teacher training institution until a separate unit, J. H. Ackerman Laboratory School, was added to the campus in 1935."

== See also ==
- National Register of Historic Places listings in Union County, Oregon
