= Geiser Grand Hotel =

- U.S. Historic district – Contributing property
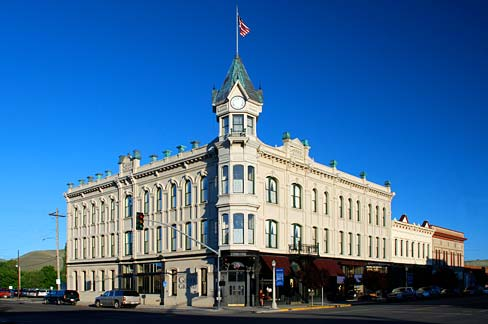
- Geiser Grand Hotel

- Location within Oregon Location within the United States
- Location: Main and Washington; Baker, Oregon, U.S.
- Coordinates: 44.77678°N 117.82936°W
- Built: 1889
- Architect: John Bennes
- Architectural style: Italianate Victorian architecture
- Part of: Baker Historic District (ID78002277)
- Added to NRHP: December 14, 1978

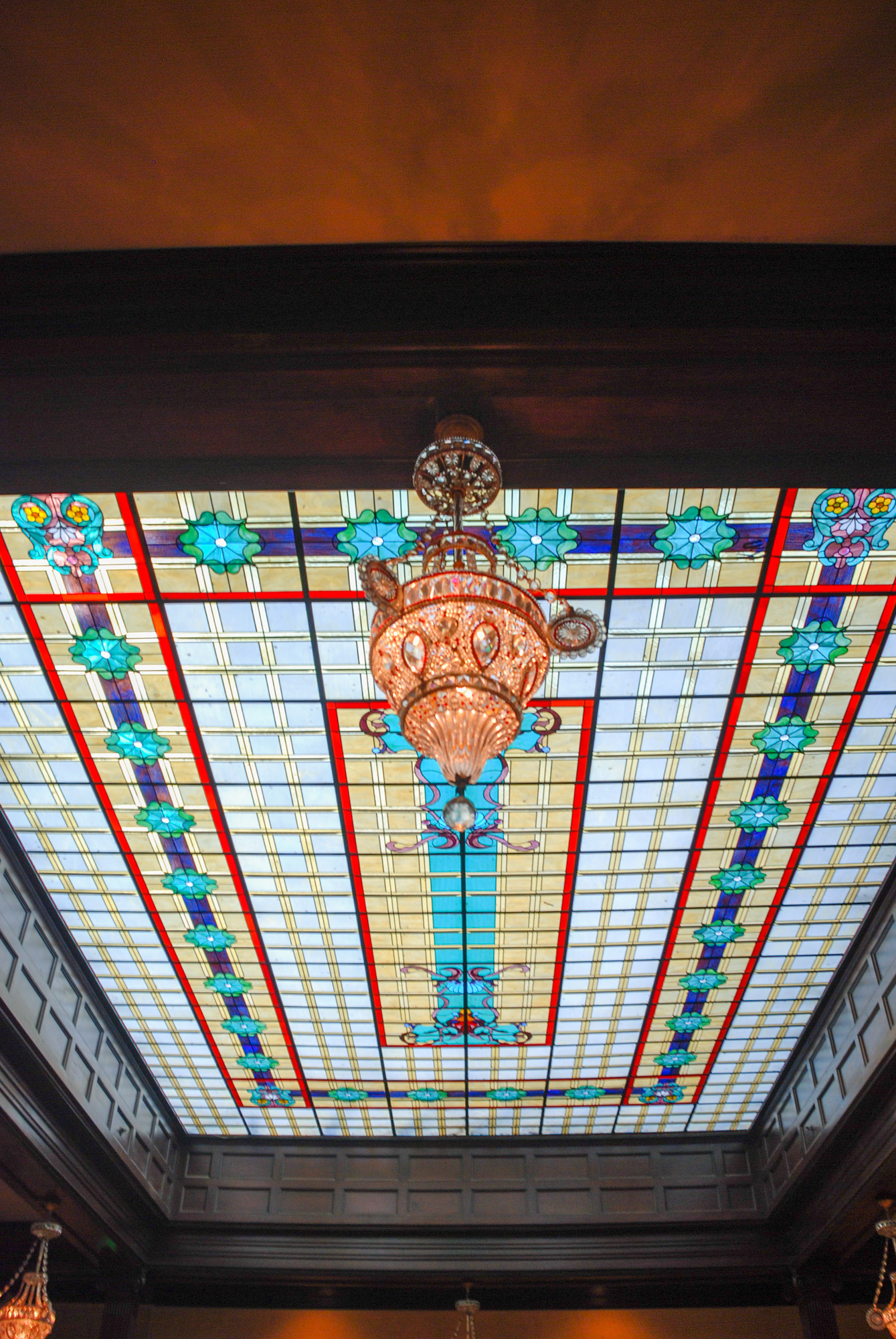
Stained glass skylight in Geiser Grand Hotel in Baker City. Baker County.

The Geiser Grand Hotel is a historic hotel in Baker City, Oregon, that opened in 1889. It received a restoration and reopened in 1993 after closing in 1968. Decorations include mahogany columns up to a high ceiling, Victorian-style chandeliers, and a stained glass ceiling. It was known as "the Queen of the Mines" during Gold Rush times and described as being the finest hotel between Portland, Oregon, and Salt Lake City, Utah, with the third elevator built west of the Mississippi River.

== Architecture ==
The hotel was built in an Italianate Victorian architecture style designed by architect John Bennes, and is listed on the National Register of Historic Places as a contributing property within the Baker Historic District. Originally named Hotel Warshauer for hotel proprietor Louis F Cook, the hotel opened in November 1889. According to Oregon Encyclopedia, Bennes made "modifications" to the hotel and didn't arrive in Baker until 1900. An original postcard of the hotel states that the hotel was built and owned by the Baker Brothers. According to the Oregonian newspaper, Mr. Geiser bought the hotel in 1900 and in 1901 planned "another story" (which obviously was not built), a reconstructed interior, and the installation of all the latest conveniences and appliances. The hotel was renamed and reopened on January 1, 1902, with the name Geiser Grand Hotel. Information on what modifications Bennes made has not been found, all sources give Bennes complete credit for the building.

== Hotel occurrences and stories ==
A 1906 story in the Reading Eagle titled Baker City Has No Poor gave an account with the hotel as a setting, with the story concluding that "Baker City was the most fortunate place in the country."

In 1959 a clerk helped apprehend a pair of robbers at the hotel by complaining of arthritis and getting the robbers to tie her up loosely and then freeing herself to call the police as they left. Country music singer Presley Wayne Spriet gave his last performance at the hotel the night before his death in 1997.

Based on various reported sightings, the hotel may be haunted.

Bennes is believed to have come from Bohemian stock, although he may have been born in Peru, Illinois, and came to Baker City from Chicago ca. 1900 and designed several other buildings in the area before moving to Portland.
