= Baker Historic District =

Historic district in Oregon, United States

- U.S. National Register of Historic Places
- U.S. Historic district
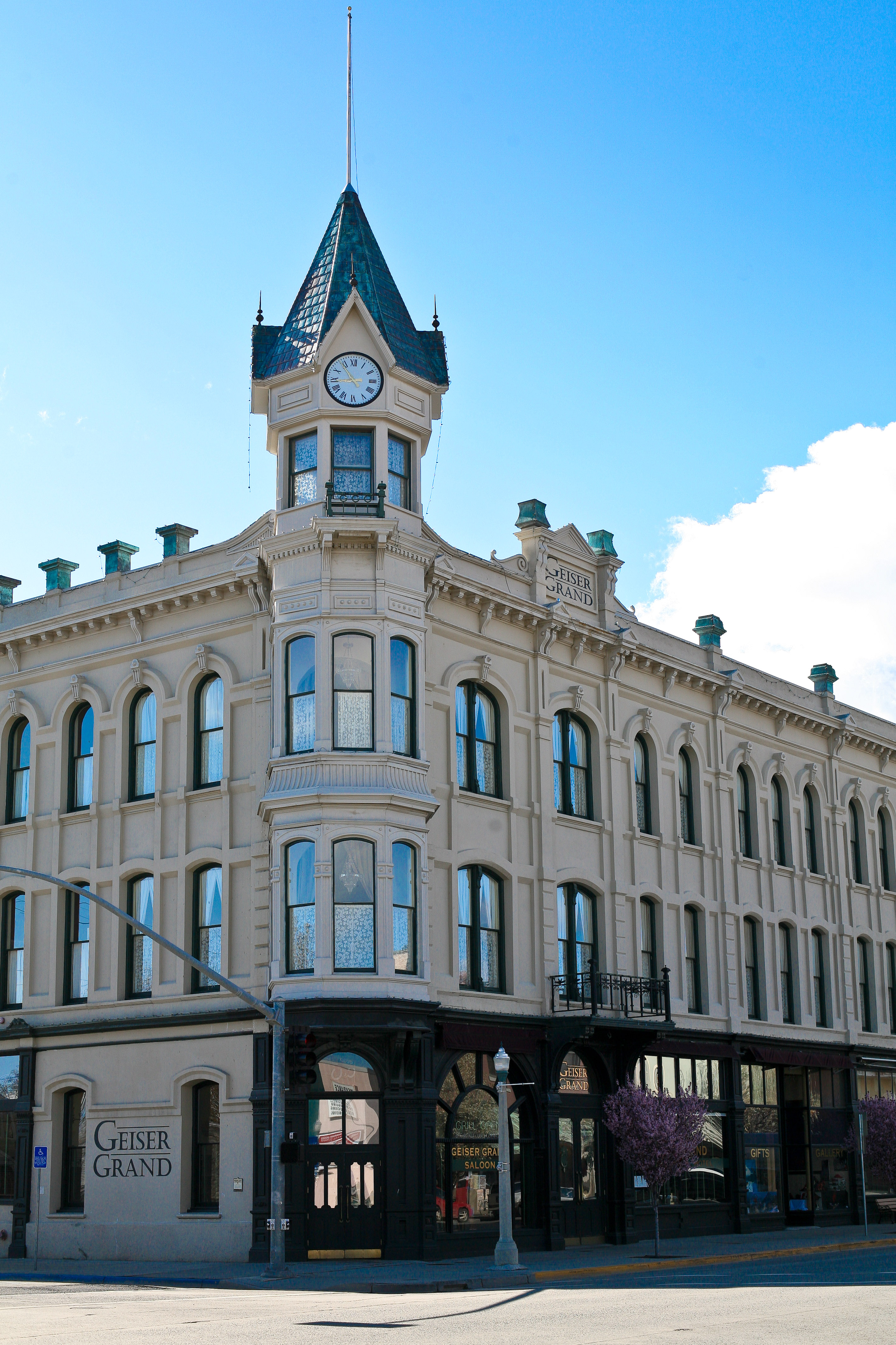
- Geiser Grand Hotel

- Location within Oregon Location within the United States

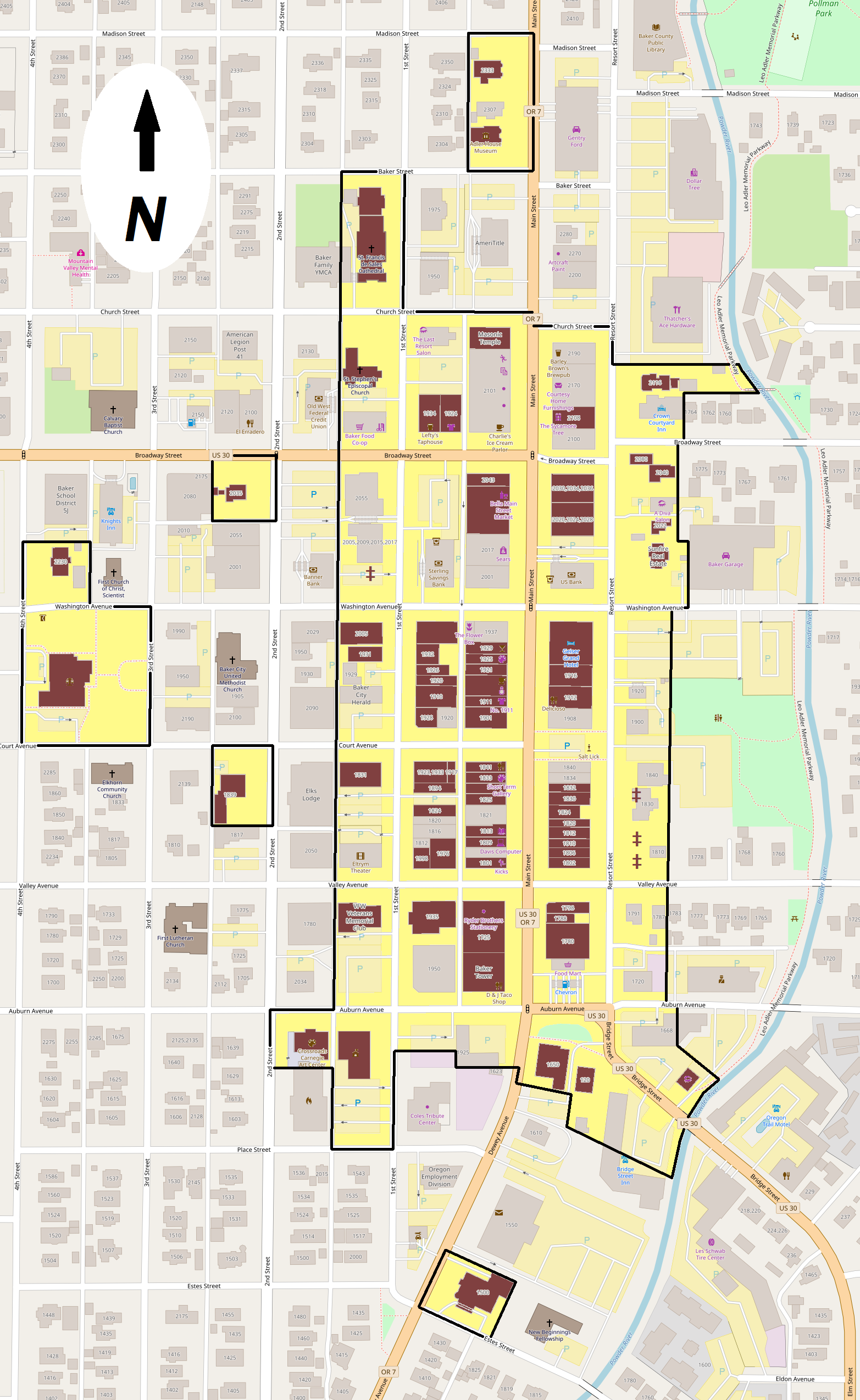
- The Baker Historic District boundaries in Baker City.
- Location: Irregular pattern along Main St. from Madison to Estes Sts., Baker, Oregon
- Coordinates: 44°46′30″N 117°49′49″W
- Area: 41.9 acres (17.0 ha)
- Built: 1870
- Architect: Multiple
- Architectural style: Late Victorian
- NRHP reference No.: 78002277
- Added to NRHP: December 14, 1978

The Baker Historic District, located in Baker City, Oregon, is listed on the National Register of Historic Places. Contributing properties include the former Baker Hotel and St. Francis de Sales Cathedral.

== See also ==
- National Register of Historic Places listings in Baker County, Oregon
