= Armstrong House =

Armstrong House, Armstrong Farm, or variations, may refer to:

- Armstrong Kessler Mansion (Savannah, Georgia), Savannah, Georgia
- A. Armstrong Farm, Newark, Delaware
- Armstrong-Walker House, Middletown, Delaware
- Armstrong House (Britt, Iowa)
- Armstrong House (Citra, Florida)
- Armstrong House (Lumpkin, Georgia)
- George and Susan Guiberson Armstrong House, Winterset, Iowa
- Robert and Esther Armstrong House, Cedar Rapids, Iowa
- Armstrong House (North Adams, Massachusetts)
- Joseph Armstrong House, Lapeer, Michigan
- John M. Armstrong House, St. Paul, Minnesota
- Armstrong-Lee House, Monticello, Mississippi, listed on the National Register of Historic Places
- Foster–Armstrong House, Montague Township, New Jersey, listed on the NRHP in Sussex County
- Louis Armstrong House, Queens, New York
- Porter Houses and Armstrong Kitchen, Whitakers, North Carolina
- Armstrong Farm (Crane Township, Wyandot County, Ohio), near Upper Sandusky, Ohio
- Joseph Armstrong Farm, Fredericksburg, Ohio
- Alfred J. and Georgia A. Armstrong House, Portland, Oregon
- Tannler–Armstrong House, Portland, Oregon
- Residencia Armstrong-Poventud, Ponce, Puerto Rico, also known as Armstrong-Toro House
- Armstrong House-Allen Academy, Bryan, Texas, listed on the National Register of Historic Places
- Armstrong-Adams House, Salado, Texas, listed on the National Register of Historic Places
- Armstrong House (Ripley, West Virginia)
- Francis Armstrong House, Salt Lake City, Utah
