= Otterbein Church =

Otterbein Church may refer to:

- Otterbein Church (Baltimore, Maryland), listed on the NRHP in Maryland
- Otterbein Church (Evans, West Virginia), listed on the NRHP in West Virginia
