= Springer Farm =

Springer Farm may refer to:

- Springer Farm (Newark, Delaware), listed on the NRHP in Delaware
- Springer Farm (Uniontown, Pennsylvania), listed on the NRHP in Pennsylvania
