= Olympic Apartment Building =

Historic building in Portland, Oregon, U.S.

- U.S. National Register of Historic Places
- U.S. Historic district – Contributing property
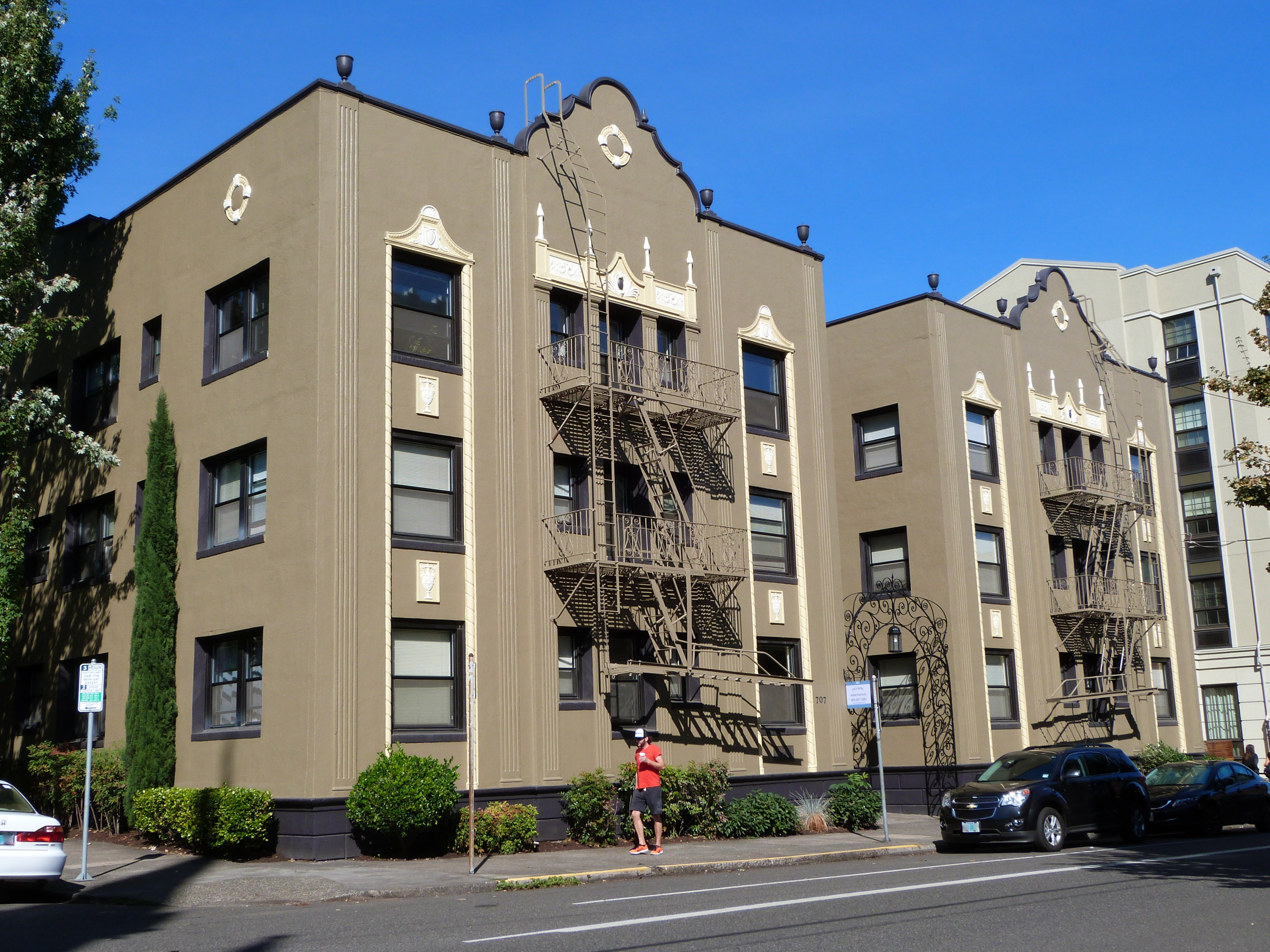
- The Olympic Apartment Building in 2015

- Location within Portland, Oregon Location within Oregon Location within the United States
- Location: 707 NW 19th Street; Portland, Oregon
- Coordinates: 45°31′41″N 122°41′27″W
- Built: 1928
- Architect: Elmer Feig
- Architectural style: Mission/Spanish Revival
- Part of: Alphabet Historic District (ID00001293)
- NRHP reference No.: 97000128
- Added to NRHP: February 21, 1997

The Olympic Apartment Building is a building located in northwest Portland, Oregon listed on the National Register of Historic Places.

== See also ==
- National Register of Historic Places listings in Northwest Portland, Oregon
