= Public School No. 29 =

- U.S. National Register of Historic Places
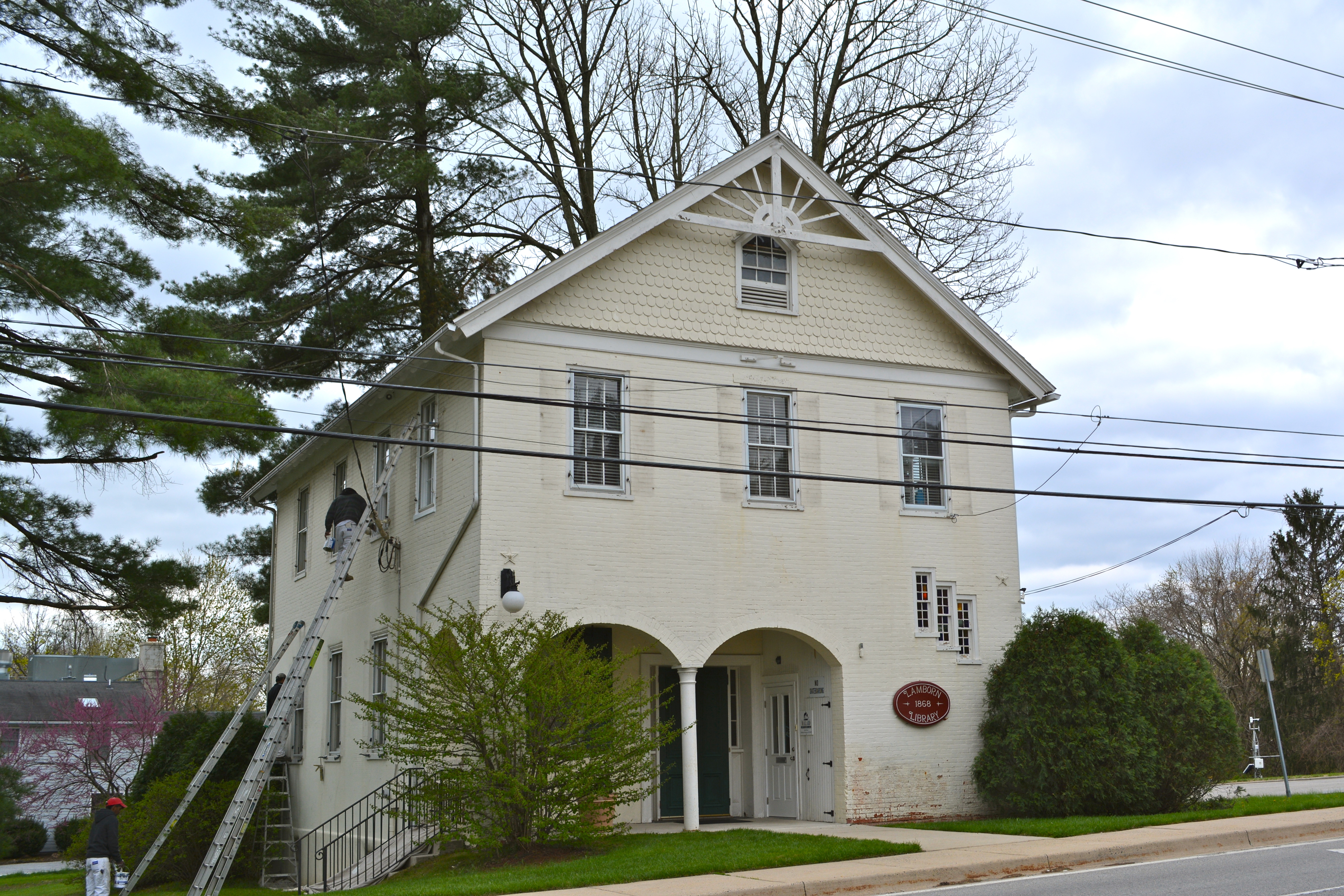

- Location within Delaware Location within the United States
- Location: 1041 Valley Rd., Hockessin, Delaware
- Coordinates: 39.78917°N 75.70052°W
- Area: less than one acre
- Built: 1870, c. 1890
- NRHP reference No.: 78000894
- Added to NRHP: May 22, 1978

Public School No. 29, also known as Lamborn Library, is a historic school building located at Hockessin, New Castle County, Delaware. It was built in 1870 as a one-room school; a second floor and classroom was added about 1890. is a two-story, brick building on a stone foundation with basement. It has a gable roof and features fish-scale shingles and Stick style detailing on the gable ends. The last owner of the building in the Lamborn family was Levis H. Lamborn. It was occupied by a school until 1932, after which it was used as a library and community center. The library moved to a new building in 1994.

It was listed on the National Register of Historic Places in 1978.

The building was gifted to the Hockessin Historical Society in 2014.
