= T. Pierson Farm =

- U.S. National Register of Historic Places
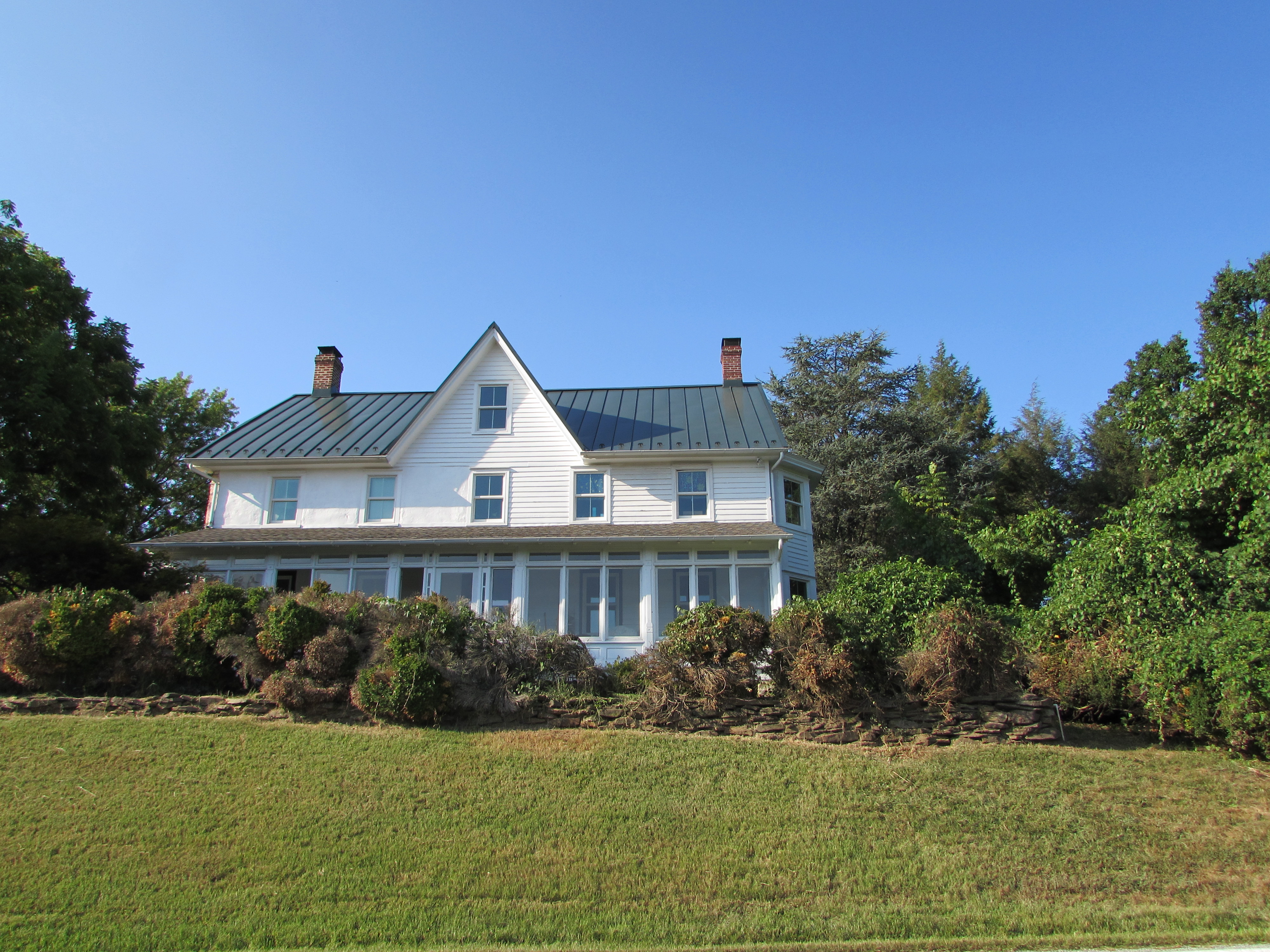
- Front of the Pierson farmhouse.

- Location within Delaware Location within the United States
- Location: 669 Southwood Rd., Hockessin, Delaware
- Coordinates: 39.787814°N 75.715642°W
- Area: 13.4 acres (5.4 ha)
- Built: 1816
- Architectural style: Late Victorian, Bi-level barn
- MPS: Agricultural Buildings and Complexes in Mill Creek Hundred, 1800-1840 TR
- NRHP reference No.: 86003101
- Added to NRHP: November 13, 1986

The T. Pierson Farm is a historic farm located at Hockessin, New Castle County, Delaware. The property includes three contributing buildings. They are a stone house (c. 1810) with late-19th century frame addition, a stone and frame bank barn (c. 1820), and a mid-19th century frame outbuilding. The house is a two-story, two-bay, gable-roofed building that is constructed with rubble fieldstone. It has a two-story, three-bay, frame wing to form a five-bay main facade. The barn features a pyramidal-roofed cupola with louvered sides atop the gable roof.

It was added to the National Register of Historic Places in 1986.
