= Hockessin Friends Meetinghouse =

Historic Quaker meetinghouse in Delaware, United States

- U.S. National Register of Historic Places
- U.S. Historic district
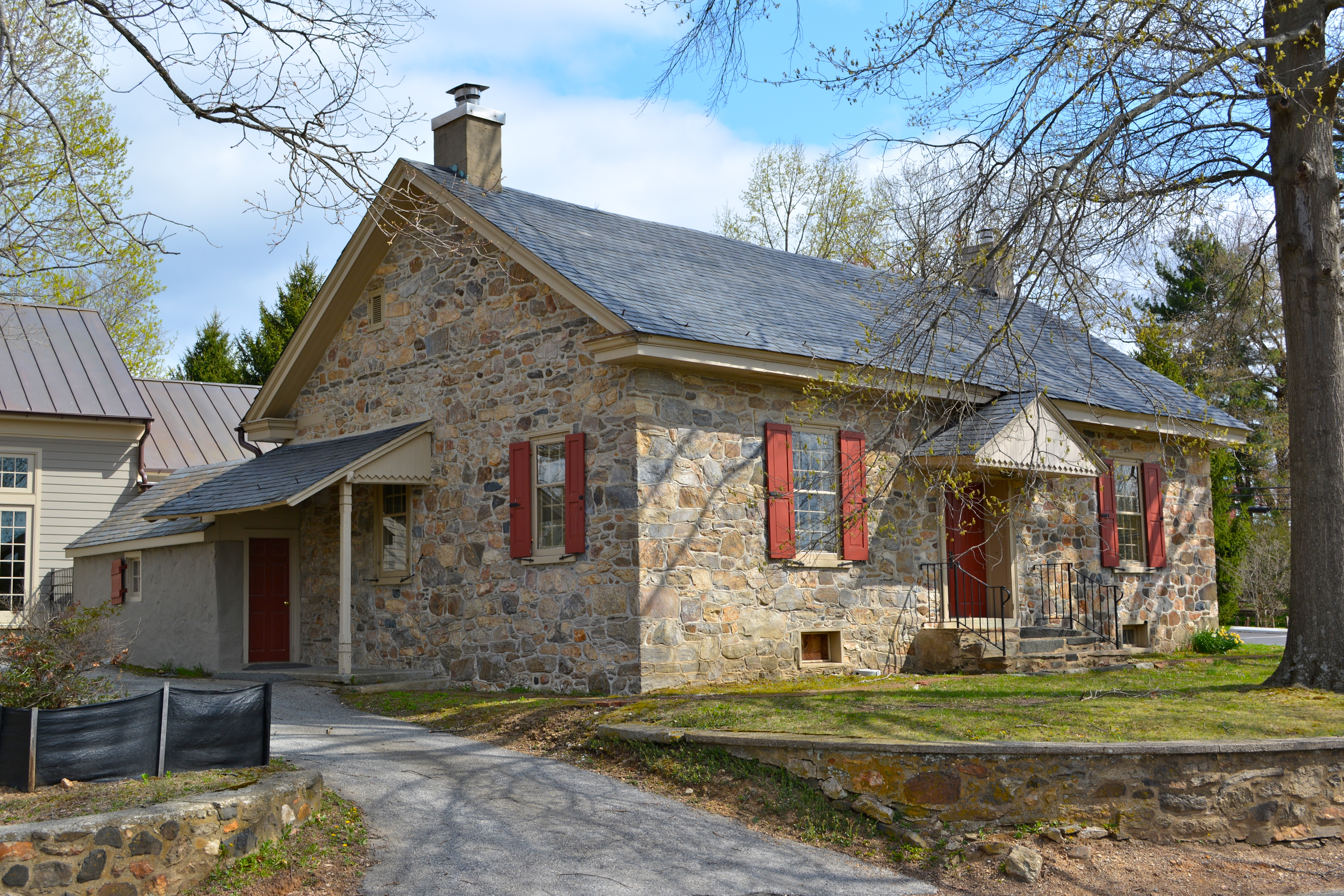
- View from the northwest in 2014

- Location within Delaware Location within the United States
- Location: 1501 Old Wilmington Rd., Hockessin, Delaware
- Coordinates: 39.792837°N 75.691009°W
- Area: 5 acres (2.0 ha)
- Built: 1738
- NRHP reference No.: 73000510
- Added to NRHP: March 20, 1973

Hockessin Friends Meetinghouse is a historic Quaker meeting house and national historic district located at 1501 Old Wilmington Road in Hockessin, New Castle County, in the U.S. state of Delaware. The district encompasses three contributing buildings and one contributing site. It was added to the National Register of Historic Places in 1973.

== History ==
The first meeting in the area was held at the home of William Cox, in Mill Creek Hundred, New Castle County in about 1730, but not regularly established until 1737. Some of the first members were Cox, John Baldwin and Henry and John Dixon. The origin of the name Hockessin is most likely not from an Indian word as previously though as the connection to local Native American language does not have merit. It was previously believed the name Hockessin was given from an Indian village formerly in the area. While the word Hockessin does look like a Native American word, the name Hockessin did not show up on any early maps until many years after the Hockessin Meeting House was built and what is now the Village of Hockessin was never settled by the Native Americans, while they did have a hunting camp nearby. There was no town name Hockessin and the area was referred to as Mill Creek Hundred. The actual name is believed to be derived from one of the first settled properties which was named Occasion and settled by William Cox in 1726 and also the location of the first Quaker meetings in the area before Hockessin Meeting House was built a few years later. The earliest known use of the word Occasion was in 1734 in a property deed for this property. And the road to the Hockessin Meeting House, currently Old Wilmington Road, was written as Ockession Road on a map in 1808.

While unsupported by documentation it is believed that the meetinghouse operated as the only school in the area from the late 1700s to the early 1800s. The meetinghouse was also the site of a British troop campsite on September 9, 1777 while troops under the command of Lord Cornwallis headed towards the Battle of the Brandywine.

== Structure ==
The meeting house was built in 1738 and enlarged in 1745. In 1973 it was a one-story, white plastered stone building with a gable roof. Photographs taken in 2014 show the plaster has been removed from the stone. It has a gable roof with projecting cornice and a crown moulding at the roof line. The other contributing buildings are a stable and a frame storehouse and a stone house dated to 1817. The contributing site is the cemetery.

== Gallery ==
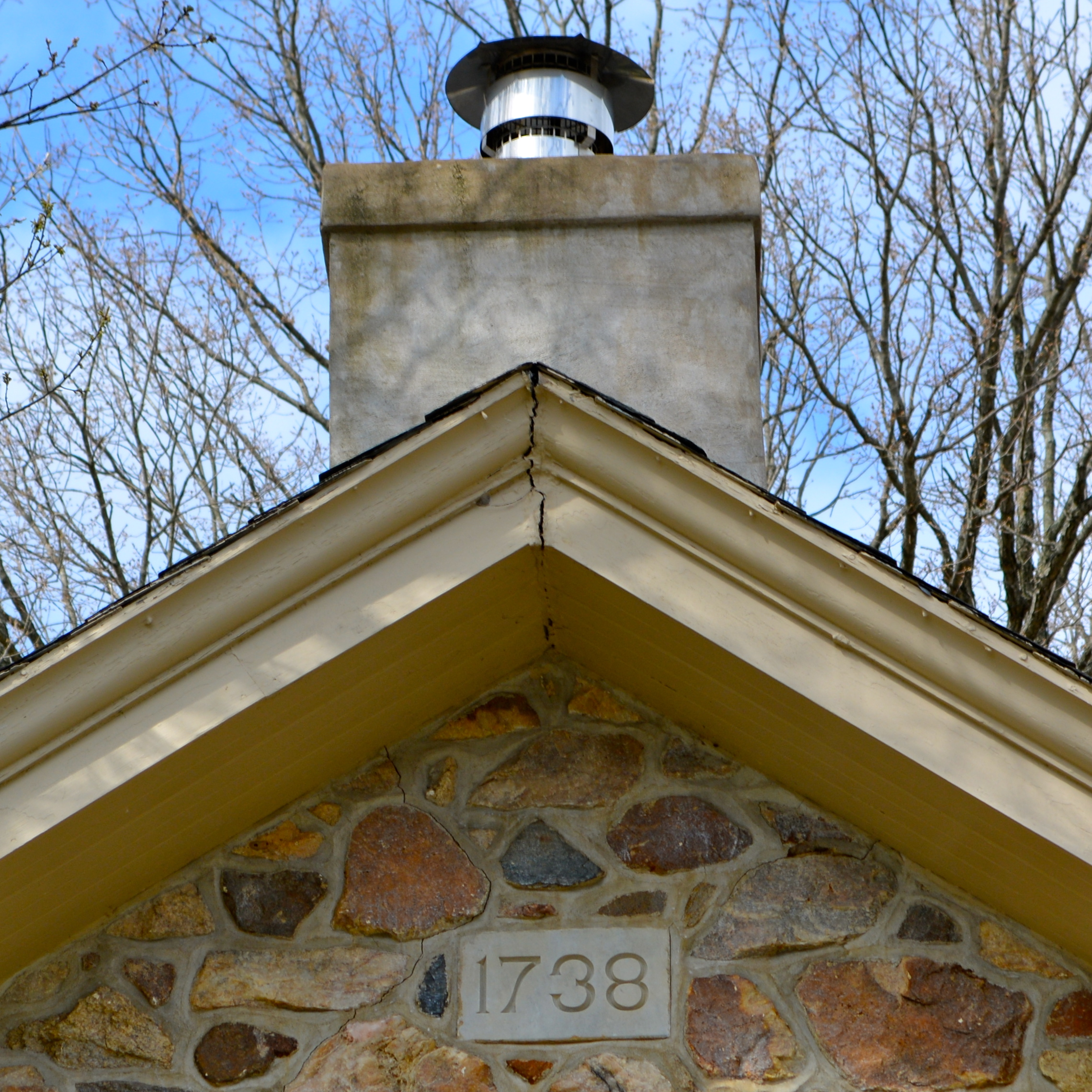
1738 datestone

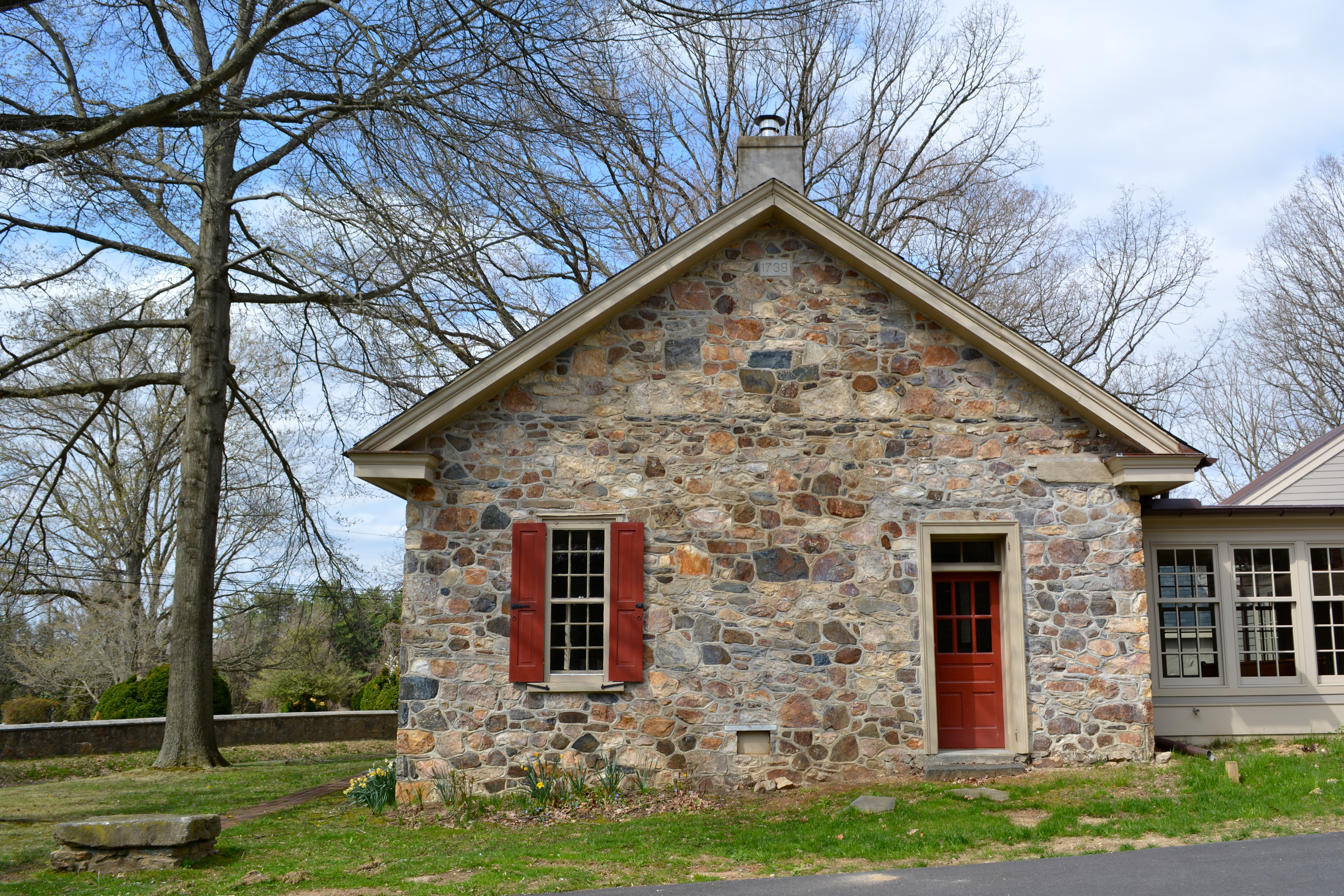
View from the south, 2014
