= Hockessin, Delaware =

Census-designated place in Delaware, United States

- CDP
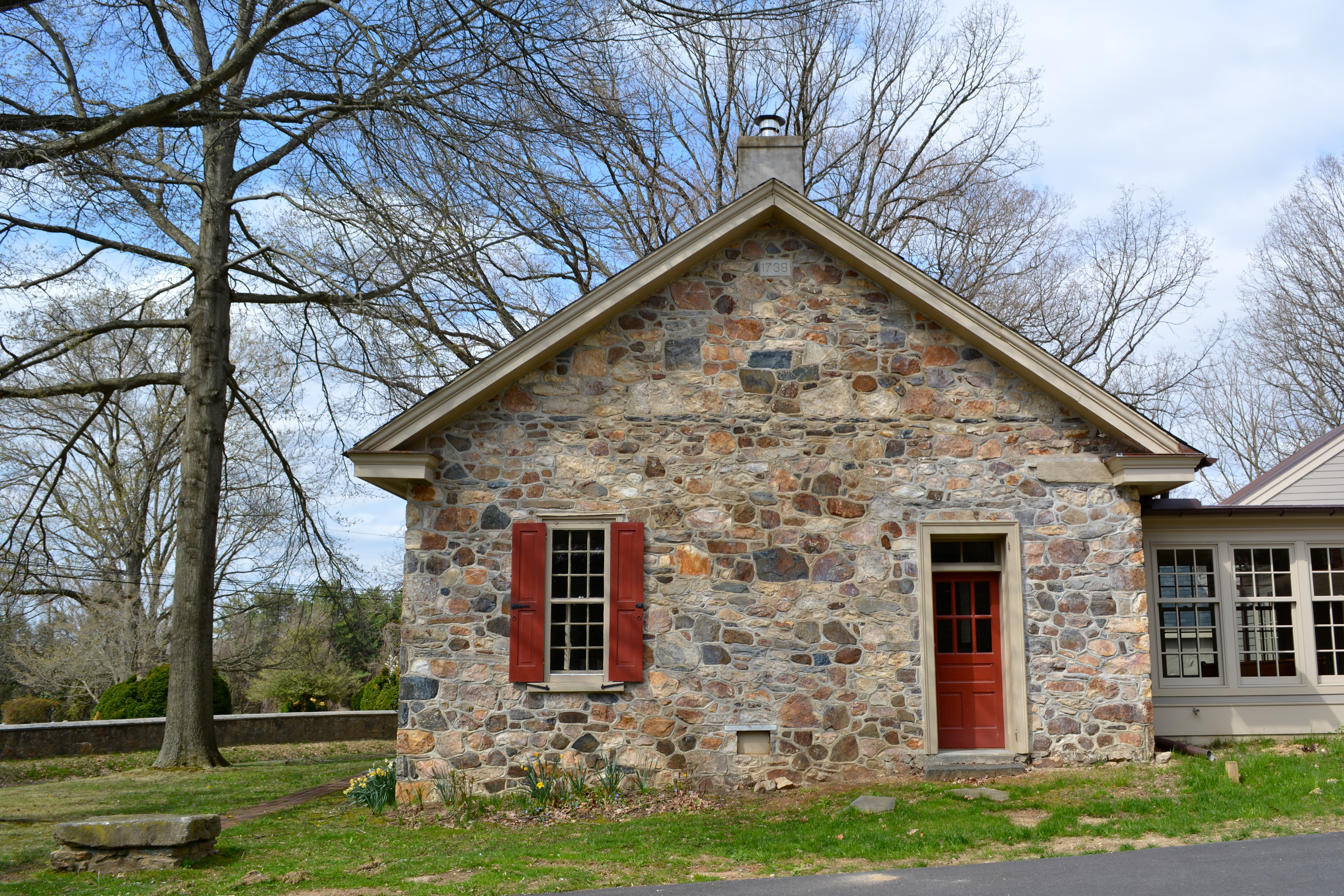
- Hockessin Friends Meetinghouse

- Location in New Castle County and the state of Delaware.

- Location within the state of Delaware Hockessin (the United States)
- Coordinates: 39°47′15″N 75°41′48″W
- Country: United States
- State: Delaware
- County: New Castle

Area
  - Total: 10.05 sq mi (26.02 km^{2})
  - Land: 10.04 sq mi (26.01 km^{2})
  - Water: 0.0077 sq mi (0.02 km^{2})
- Elevation: 259 ft (79 m)

Population (2020)
  - Total: 13,478
  - Density: 1,342.3/sq mi (518.26/km^{2})
- Time zone: UTC-5 (Eastern (EST))
  - Summer (DST): UTC-4 (EDT)
- ZIP code: 19707
- Area code: 302
- FIPS code: 10-35850
- GNIS feature ID: 214099

Hockessin (/ˈhoʊkɛsɪn/) is a census-designated place (CDP) in New Castle County, Delaware, United States. The population was 13,478 at the 2020 Census.

== History ==
Hockessin came into existence as a little village in 1688 when several families settled in the area. The village was named after the Lenape word hokes, meaning good bark or good bark hill. There is a second and more likely origin for the name. While the word Hockessin does look like a Native American word, the name Hockessin did not show up on any early maps until many years after the Hockessin Meeting House was built and what is now the Village of Hockessin was never settled by the Native Americans, while they did have a hunting camp nearby. There was no town name Hockessin and the area was referred to as Mill Creek Hundred. The actual name is believed to be derived from one of the first settled properties which was named Occasion and settled by William Cox in 1726 and also the location of the first Quaker meetings in the area before Hockessin Meeting House was built a few years later. The earliest known use of the word Occasion was in 1734 in a property deed for this property. And the road to the Hockessin Meeting House, currently Old Wilmington Road, was written as Ockession Road on a map in 1808. The first Roman Catholic church in Delaware was located in Hockessin. Missionary priests from Maryland established the Coffee Run Mission in 1790.

The A. Armstrong Farm, Coffee Run Mission Site, Hockessin Friends Meetinghouse, T. Pierson Farm, Public School No. 29, Springer Farm, and Wilmington and Western Railroad are listed on the National Register of Historic Places in 1978. More recently added sites to the National Register of Historic Places include: Tweed's Tavern, the home of Negro league baseball player James "Nip" Winters, Colored School #107C, St. John the Evangelist Church, the Daniel Nichols house, and the Cox/Phillips/Mitchell Agricultural Complex.

== Geography ==
The community is near the northwestern border of Delaware, within 1.2 mi (1.9 km) of the Pennsylvania border on the east bank of Mill Creek.

According to the United States Census Bureau, the CDP has a total area of 10.0 square miles (26 km^{2}), of which 10.0 square miles (26 km^{2}) is land and 0.10% is water.

== Demographics ==
Historical population
Census	Pop.	Note	%±
1990	10,051		—
2000	12,902		28.4%
2010	13,527		4.8%
2020	13,478		−0.4%

=== 2020 census ===
As of the 2020 census, Hockessin had a population of 13,478. The median age was 49.5 years. 19.8% of residents were under the age of 18 and 26.2% of residents were 65 years of age or older. For every 100 females, there were 93.4 males, and for every 100 females age 18 and over, there were 93.0 males age 18 and over.

98.1% of residents lived in urban areas, while 1.9% lived in rural areas.

There were 4,938 households in Hockessin, of which 30.4% had children under the age of 18 living in them. Of all households, 69.2% were married-couple households, 9.5% were households with a male householder and no spouse or partner present, and 17.6% were households with a female householder and no spouse or partner present. About 17.4% of all households were made up of individuals, and 12.0% had someone living alone who was 65 years of age or older.

There were 5,113 housing units, of which 3.4% were vacant. The homeowner vacancy rate was 0.6%, and the rental vacancy rate was 7.3%.

Racial composition as of the 2020 census
Race	Number	Percent
White	10,217	75.8%
Black or African American	423	3.1%
American Indian and Alaska Native	13	0.1%
Asian	1,832	13.6%
Native Hawaiian and Other Pacific Islander	4	0.0%
Some other race	166	1.2%
Two or more races	823	6.1%
Hispanic or Latino (of any race)	555	4.1%

=== 2000 census ===
As of the census of 2000, there were 12,902 people, 4,464 households, and 3,731 families residing in the CDP. The population density was 1,286.7 inhabitants per square mile (496.8/km^{2}). There were 4,575 housing units at an average density of 456.3 per square mile (176.2/km^{2}). The racial makeup of the CDP was 88.8% White, 2.7% African American, 0.2% Native American, 7.2% Asian, <0.1% Pacific Islander, 0.5% from other races, and 0.8% from two or more races. Hispanic or Latino of any race were 2.0% of the population.

There were 4,464 households, out of which 40.1% had children under the age of 18 living with them, 77.3% were married couples living together, 4.5% had a female householder with no husband present, and 16.4% were non-families. 13.9% of all households were made up of individuals, and 8.9% had someone living alone who was 65 years of age or older. The average household size was 2.83, and the average family size was 3.13.

In the CDP, the population was spread out, with 26.9% under the age of 18, 4.7% from 18 to 24, 24.5% from 25 to 44, 28.7% from 45 to 64, and 15.3% who were 65 years of age or older. The median age was 42 years. For every 100 females, there were 95.6 males. For every 100 females age 18 and over, there were 91.9 males.

The median income for a household in the CDP was $100,844, and the median income for a family was $108,784. Males had a median income of $76,617 versus $46,988 for females. The per capita income for the CDP was $40,516. About 1.0% of families and 1.7% of the population were below the poverty line, including 2.0% of those under age 18 and 1.3% of those age 65 or over.

=== Demographic estimates ===
From 1990 to 2016, the population of Hockessin grew by about 35%.

== Economy ==
Although Hockessin is primarily a bedroom community, there are several mushroom farms operating in the area.

Hockessin contains the Lantana Square Shopping Center, and the Hockessin Athletic Club, which contains a pool, indoor gym, and walking trail.

== Arts and culture ==
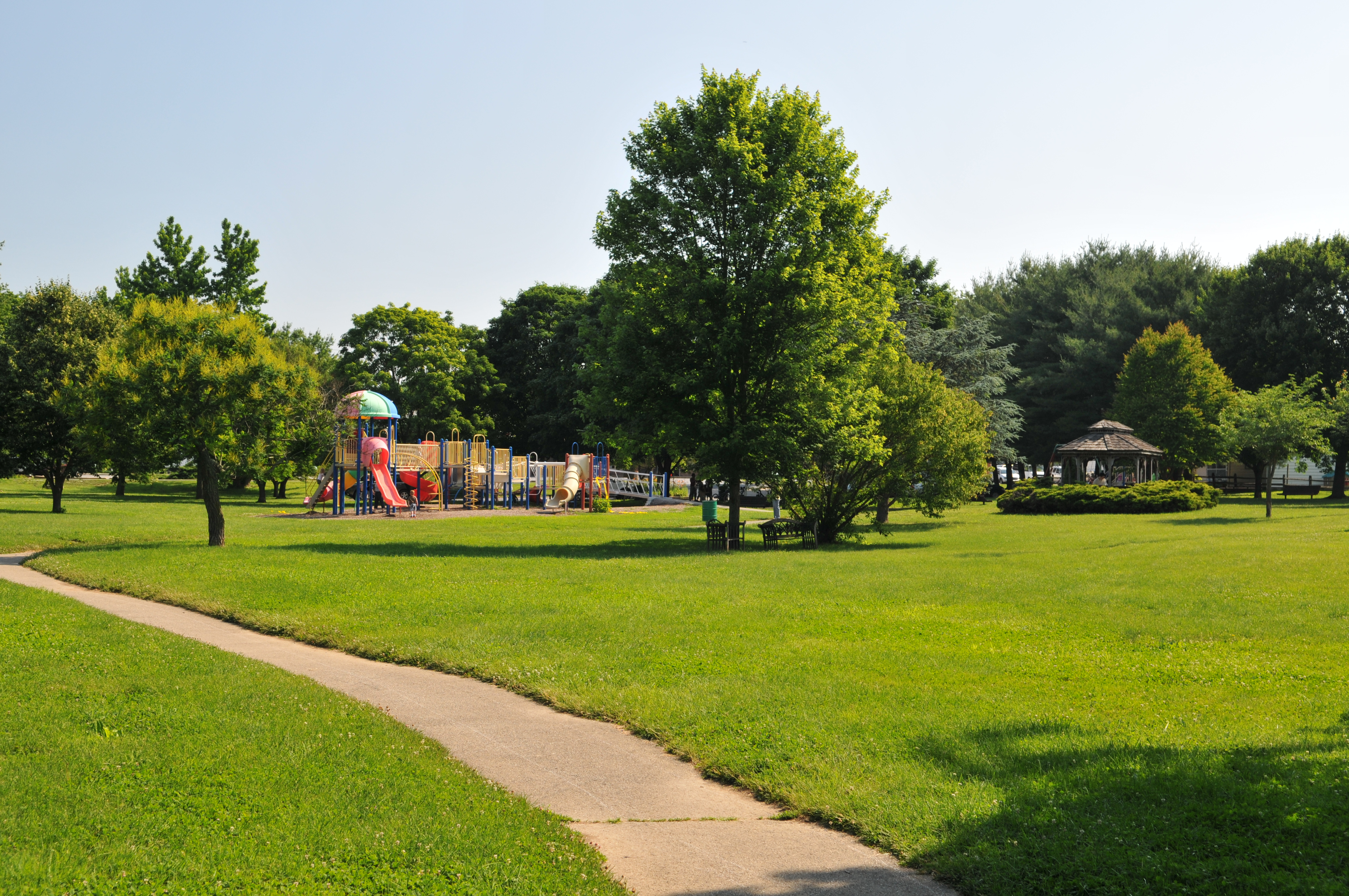
Swift Memorial Park in Hockessin

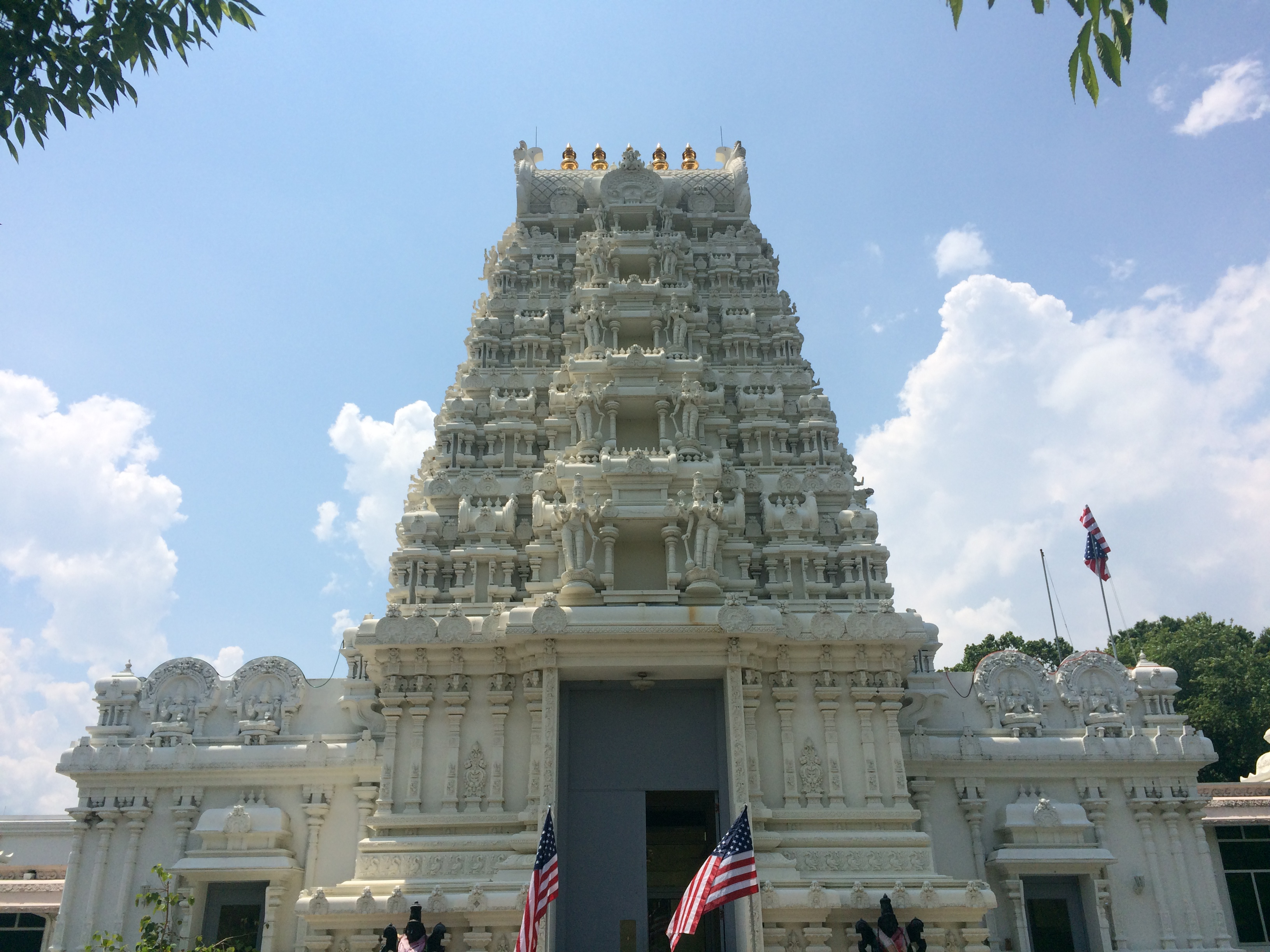
Hindu Temple of Delaware in Hockessin

Hockessin hosts several Fourth of July activities for the area residents. Local groups parade down Old Lancaster Pike, neighborhoods compete in different athletic events, and there is a fireworks display in the evening in Swift Park.

== Education ==
Hockessin is served by the Red Clay Consolidated School District for public education.

Elementary schools serving Hockessin for grades K through 5 include Cooke Elementary School and North Star Elementary School. Public school students in grades 6 through 8 are zoned to Henry B. duPont Middle School. Students in grades 9 through 12 in Hockessin are zoned to Thomas McKean High School to the south of Hockessin or Alexis I. duPont High School in Greenville, with students in the western part of Hockessin attending John Dickinson High School in Pike Creek. Cab Calloway School of the Arts and Conrad Schools of Science are magnet schools that take middle and high school students.

Private schools in Hockessin include CACC (Chinese American Community Center) Montessori School, Hockessin Montessori School, Sanford School, and Wilmington Christian School.

Hockessin School District 29 and Hockessin School District 107 merged into the Alexis I. DuPont Special School District effective April 24, 1958 and March 5, 1959, respectively. The Alexis DuPont Special school district was reorganized on July 1, 1969, as the Alexis I. DuPont School District. The Alexis I. DuPont district merged into the New Castle County School District in 1978. That district was divided into four districts, among them the Red Clay district, in 1981.

In the era of de jure educational segregation in the United States (before circa 1970), there was the Hockessin Colored Elementary School for African-American students.

New Castle County Library maintains the Hockessin Library.

== Infrastructure ==
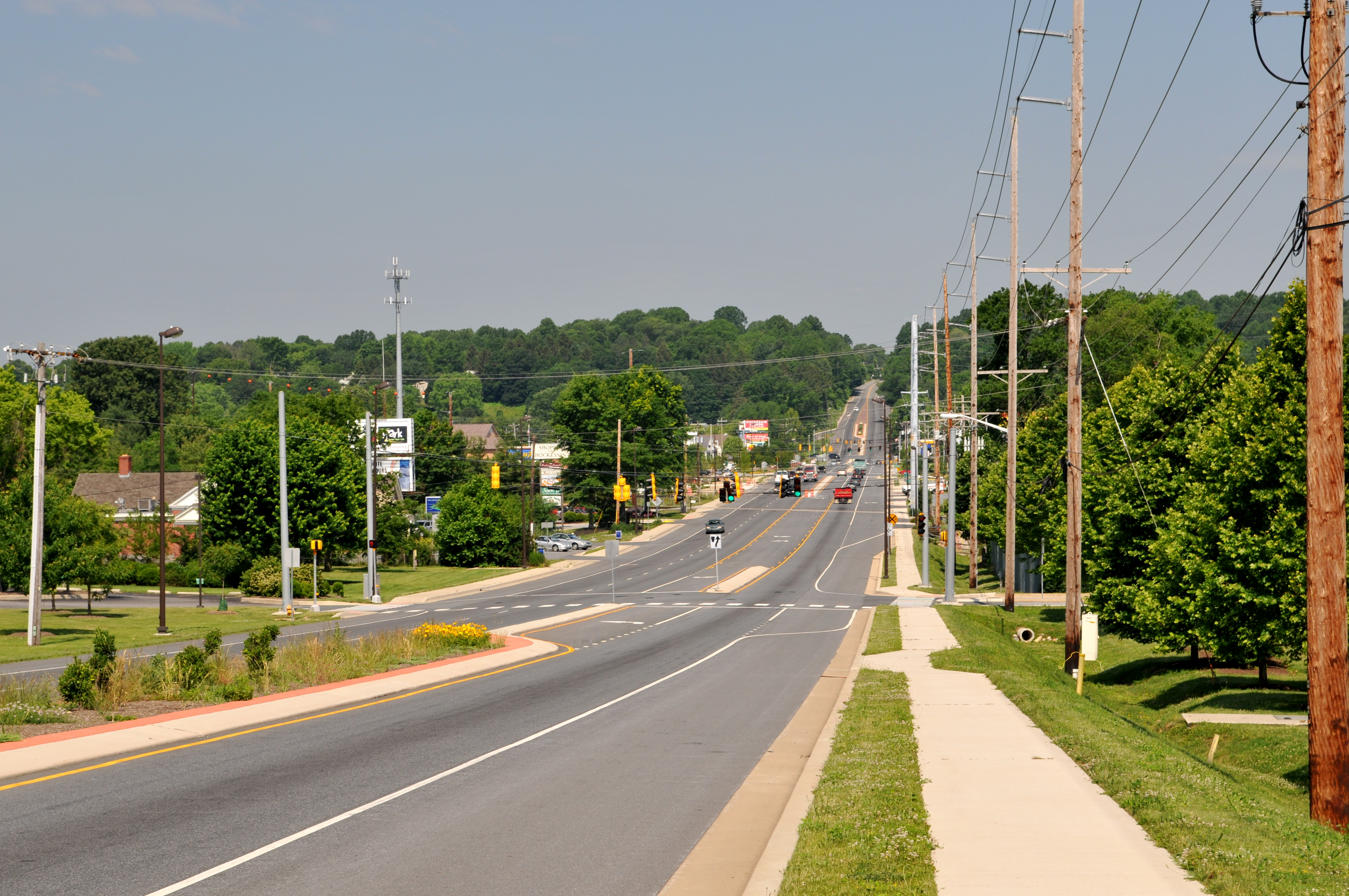
Lancaster Pike (Route 41) in Hockessin, facing north towards the business/retail area

=== Transportation ===
The main road through Hockessin is Delaware Route 41 (Lancaster Pike) which heads southeast toward Wilmington and northwest toward the Pennsylvania border, where it becomes Pennsylvania Route 41 and continues toward Lancaster. South of Hockessin, Delaware Route 48 splits from DE 41 to follow Lancaster Pike to Wilmington while DE 41 continues along Newport Gap Pike to Prices Corner. Delaware Route 7 passes through the western part of Hockessin along Limestone Road, heading north to the Pennsylvania border and south toward Pike Creek and Christiana. The northern terminus of the Wilmington and Western Railroad, a tourist railroad, is in Hockessin; the railroad follows the Red Clay Creek valley south to Greenbank. DART First State provides bus service to Hockessin along Route 20, which follows Lancaster Pike to Wilmington and ends at the Wilmington station served by Amtrak and SEPTA Regional Rail's Wilmington/Newark Line. DART First State's Route 20 bus serves park and ride lots located at Hockessin Memorial Hall and the Wells Fargo bank.

== Notable people ==
- Delsworth Buckingham, Delaware state representative
- Chris Coons, US Senator from Delaware
- Matt Denn, Lieutenant Governor of Delaware
- Trevon Duval, basketball player for the Duke Blue Devils
- Tony Graffanino, Major League Baseball player
- Bernard Hopkins, professional boxer
- Kent A. Jordan, Federal Judge on the United States Court of Appeals for the Third Circuit
