= Tannler–Armstrong House =

Historic building in Portland, Oregon, U.S.

- U.S. National Register of Historic Places
- Portland Historic Landmark
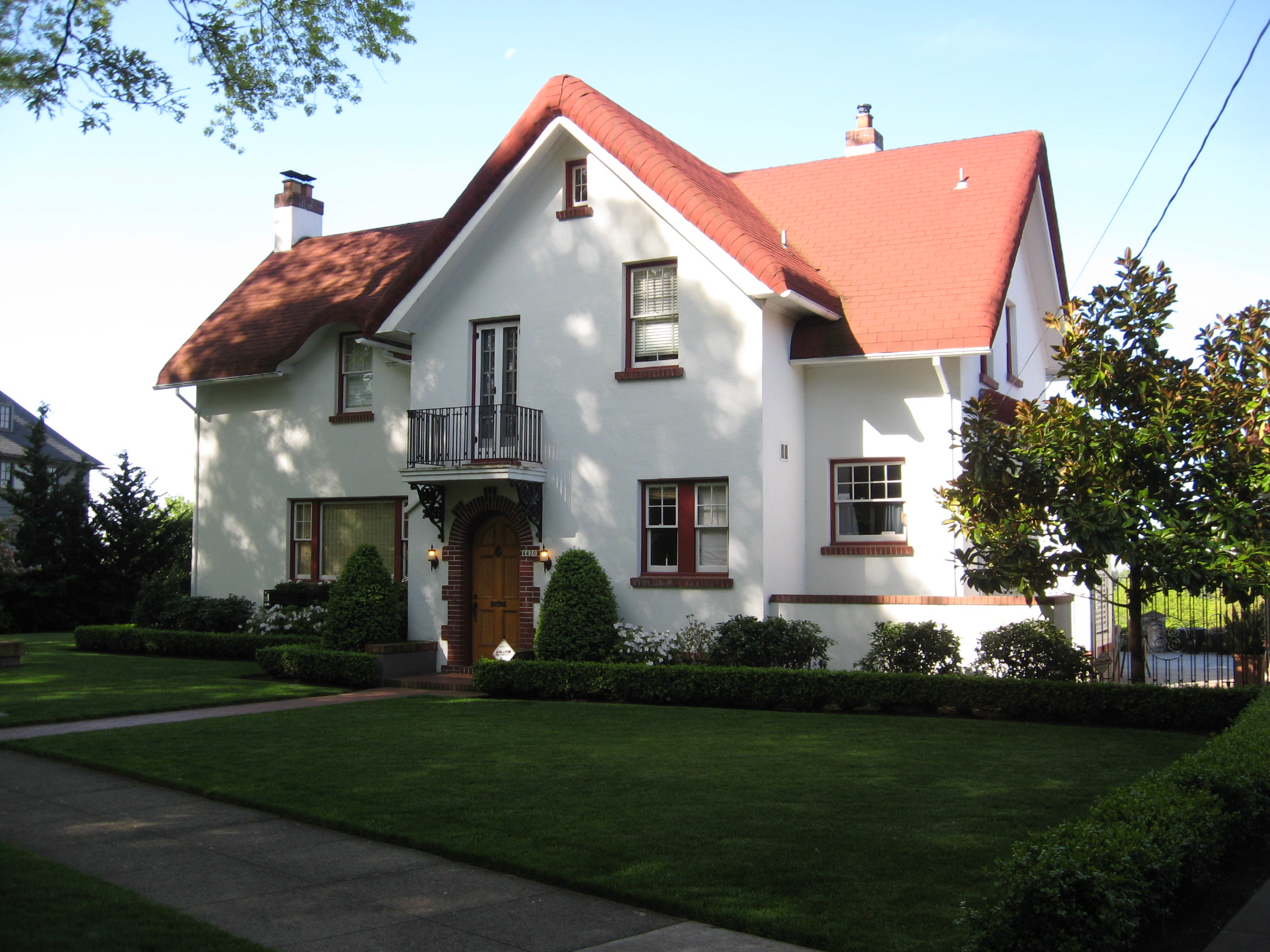
- The Tannler–Armstrong House in 2009

- Location within the United States Location within Oregon Location within Portland, Oregon
- Location: 4420 NE Alameda Street; Portland, Oregon
- Coordinates: 45°32′36″N 122°37′05″W
- Built: 1924
- Architect: Ronald M. Hopkins
- Architectural style: English Cottage
- NRHP reference No.: 02000948
- Added to NRHP: September 6, 2002

The Tannler–Armstrong House is a historic residence in Portland, Oregon, United States. It is a well-preserved and locally distinct example of the English Cottage style. Built in 1924, it was designed during a period when the style was very popular for new homes in Northeast Portland. Between 1920 and 1935, over fifty homes were built in this style in the Northeast quadrant. (Note: See also Edward H. and Bertha R. Keller House.) The house exhibits many of the defining characteristics of the English Cottage style, including rolled eaves to imitate a thatched roof, eyebrow dormers, intersecting roof lines, stucco walls, narrow, paired windows, and arched doorways.

The house was entered on the National Register of Historic Places in 2002.

== See also ==
- National Register of Historic Places listings in Northeast Portland, Oregon
