= Joseph Armstrong House =

Historic house in Michigan, United States

- U.S. National Register of Historic Places
- Michigan State Historic Site
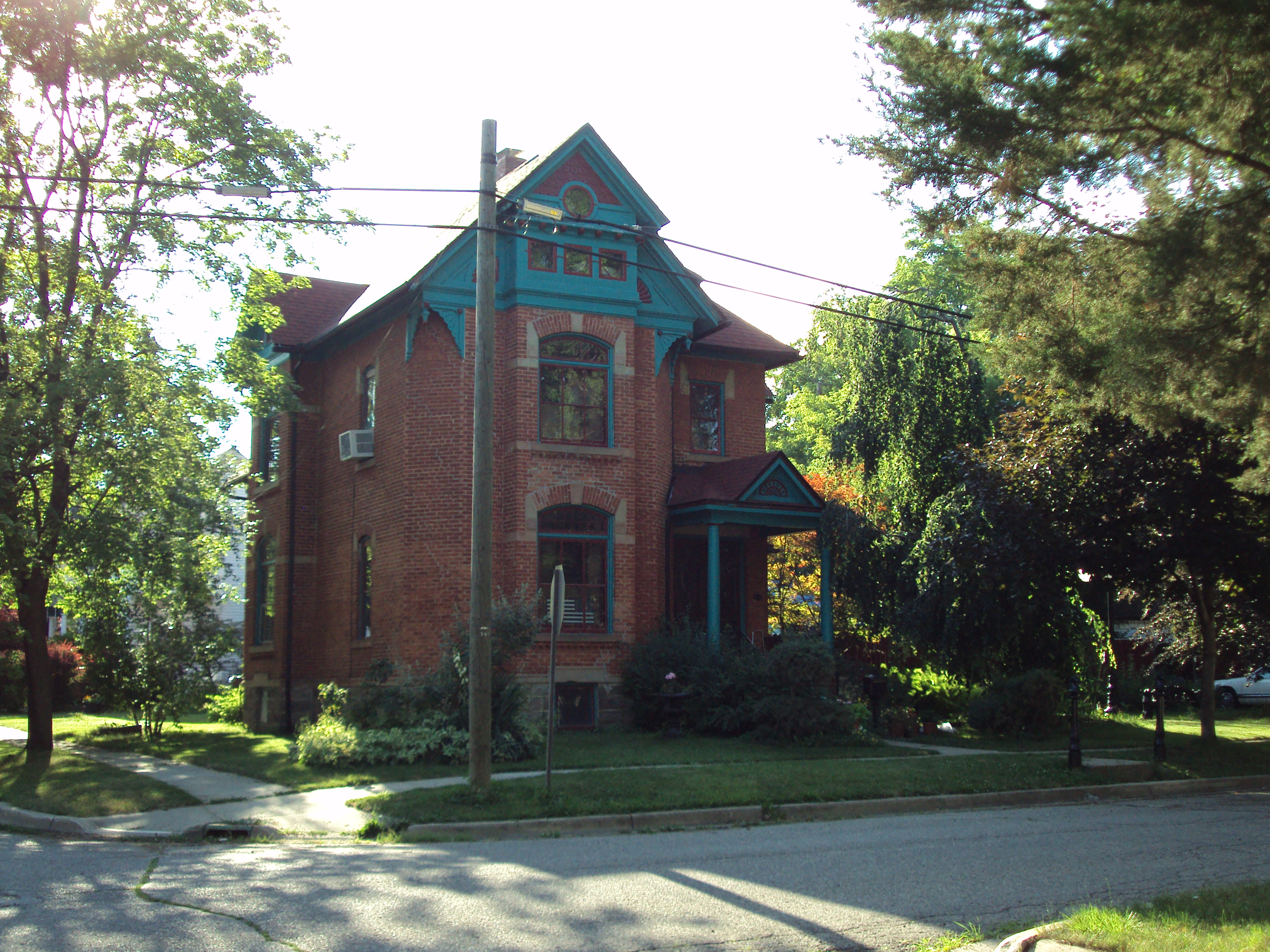

- Location within Michigan Location within the United States
- Interactive map
- Location: 707 Monroe Street; Lapeer, Michigan
- Coordinates: 43°03′20″N 83°18′58″W
- Built: 1887–1888
- Architect: Robert T. Bacon
- Architectural style: Queen Anne, Late Victorian
- MPS: Lapeer MRA
- NRHP reference No.: 85001625

Significant dates
- Added to NRHP: July 26, 1985
- Designated MSHS: July 26, 1985

The John Armstrong House is a private residential structure located at 707 Monroe Street in the city of Lapeer in Lapeer County, Michigan. It was designated as a Michigan State Historic Site and also added to the National Register of Historic Places on July 26, 1985.

== Description ==
Built in 1887–1888, the 2½-story house was built in the architectural mix of Queen Anne and Late Victorian style. The house features an irregular floor plan with a variety of window shapes. It was constructed with a combination of stone, brick, and wood for the various features. The interior design of the structure has remained unchanged since its original construction, including a second floor cistern. Between 1888 and 1892, a two-story addition was built on the back. In 1917, the dormer on the third floor was removed after a fire. In 1941, the porches were altered, and one was removed.

== History ==
The house was built for prominent local businessman Joseph Armstrong, who moved to the United States from Ireland in 1871. In 1872, he moved to Lapeer in part due to the expanding railroad in the area. He opened a dry goods store that he operated for the next 37 years before retiring. He purchased the site of his home in 1886 and contracted a local carpenter, Robert T. Bacon, to construct the house and other smaller structures on the property within the next two years.

Following Joseph Armstrong's death, the property passed to his son, Jay Armstrong. Jay died in 1956. His wife, Evelyn, lived alone in the house until her death in 1981 when the house was sold.
