= Armstrong House (North Adams, Massachusetts) =

Historic house in Massachusetts, United States

- U.S. National Register of Historic Places
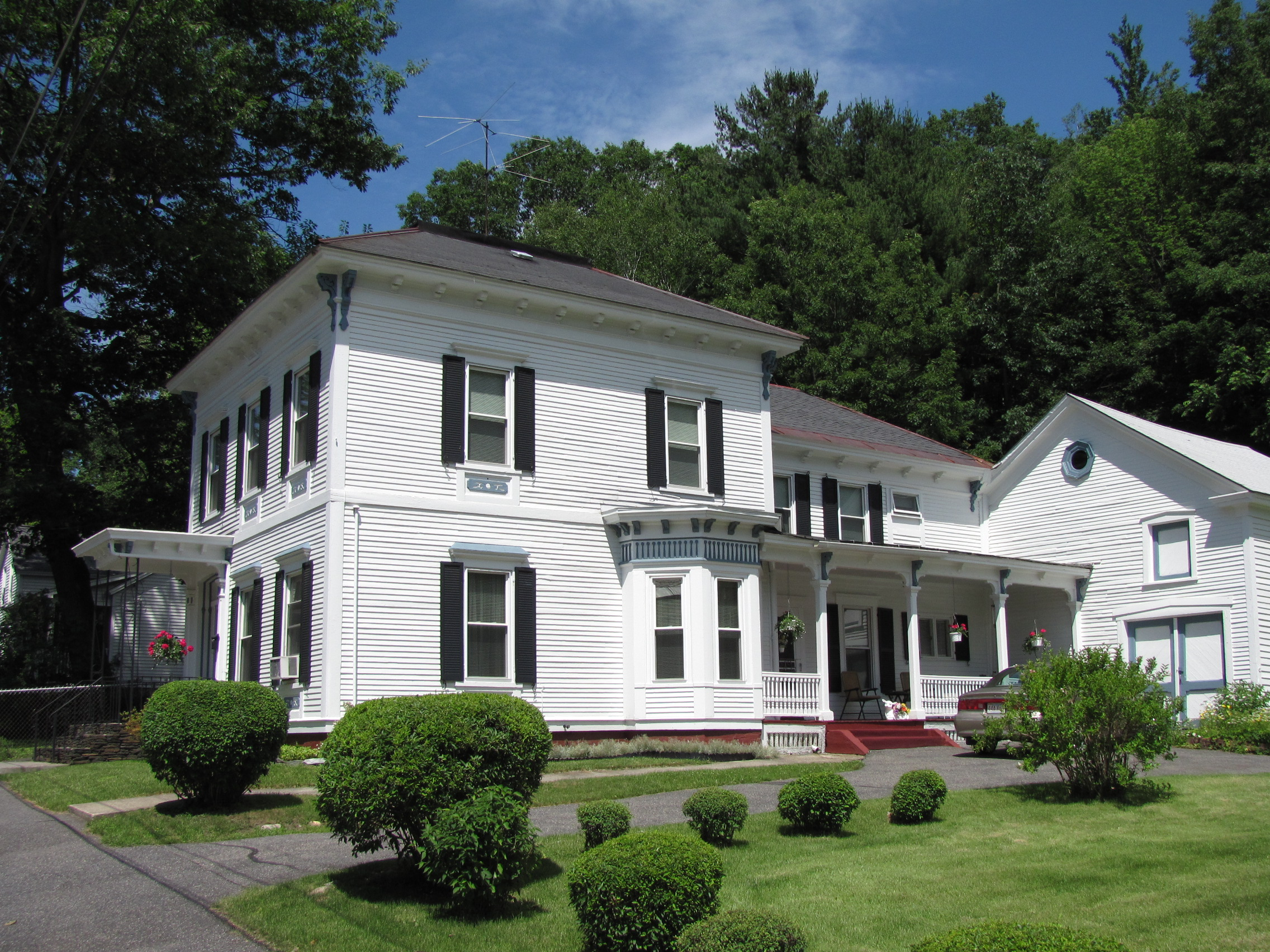
- (2010)

- Location within Massachusetts Location within the United States
- Location: 60 Brooklyn St., North Adams, Massachusetts
- Coordinates: 42°42′26″N 73°6′44″W
- Area: less than one acre
- Built: c. 1875
- Architectural style: Italianate
- MPS: North Adams MRA
- NRHP reference No.: 85003394
- Added to NRHP: October 25, 1985

The Armstrong House is a historic house located in North Adams, Massachusetts. Built about 1875, it is a well-preserved example of a locally idiosyncratic Italianate style. It was listed on the National Register of Historic Places on October 25, 1985.

== Description and history ==
The Armstrong House is located on a residential street on the north side of North Adams, on the east side of Brooklyn Street. It is a two-story wood-frame structure, three bays wide, with a low hip roof supported by decorative brackets at the corners and studded with modillion blocks. Its main entrance is in the leftmost bay, with a portico that is also bracketed, with 20th-century columns and balustrade that are sympathetic to its Italianate style. A single-story polygonal bay projects from the right side of the main block. A two-story ell extends to the rear, connecting the house to a barn that is of the same vintage as the house, with an oculus window in its gable end. Extending across the ell's side is a bracketed shed-roof porch.

The house was built in 1875, during North Adams' industrial boom time. Its combination of features are a locally distinctive variant of the Italianate style, which is found repeated elsewhere in the community. The house was built for W. W. Armstrong, a worker at the Arnold Print Works, and is considered one of North Adams' best-preserved Italianate houses.

== See also ==
- National Register of Historic Places listings in Berkshire County, Massachusetts
