= Armstrong-Walker House =

Historic house in Delaware, US

- U.S. National Register of Historic Places
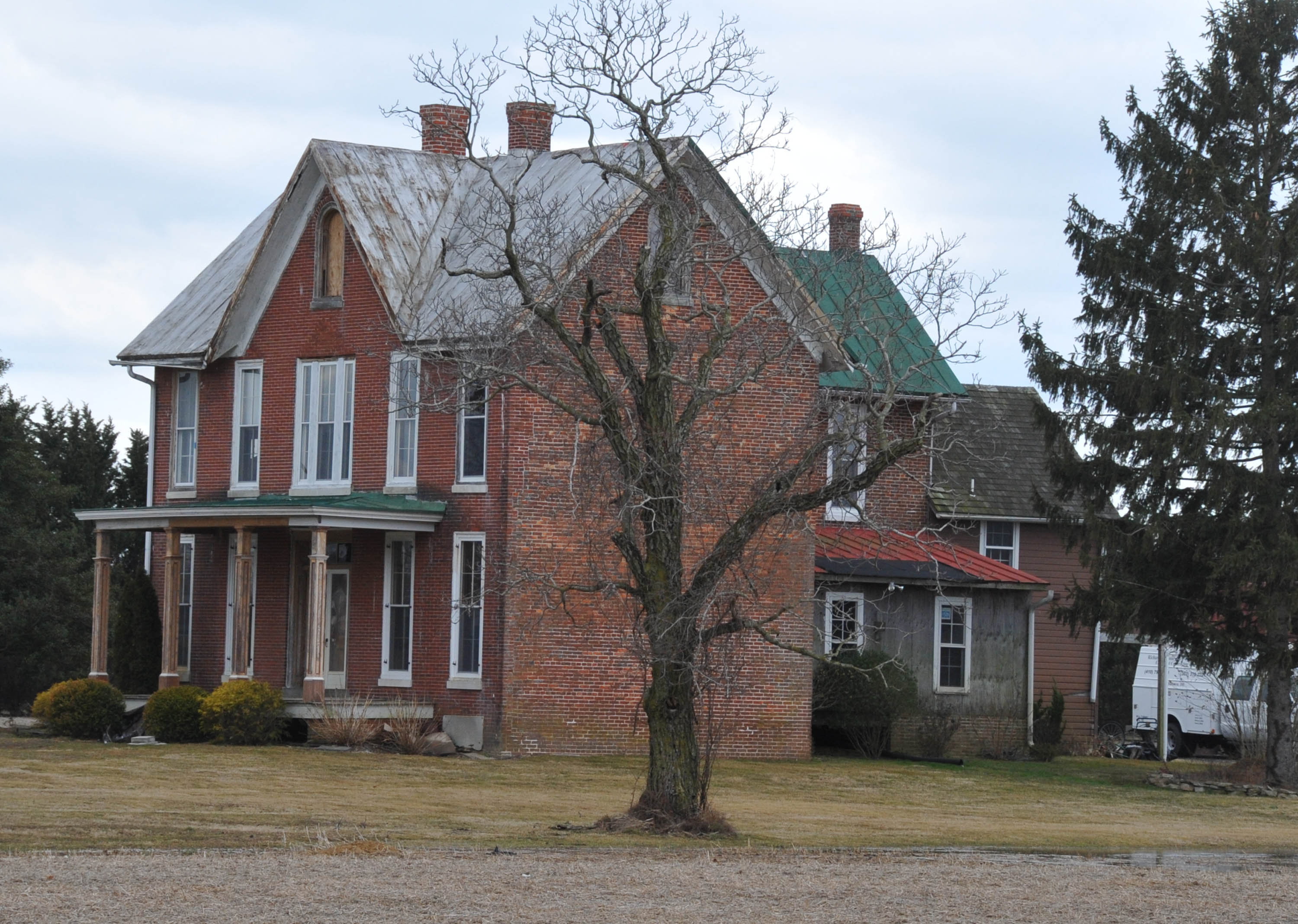

- Location within Delaware Location within the United States
- Location: 5036 Summit Bridge Road in St George's Hundred, near Middletown, Delaware
- Coordinates: 39°28′41″N 75°43′16″W
- Area: 5 acres (2.0 ha)
- Built: 1870
- Built by: Walker, Martin E.
- Architectural style: Late Victorian, Greek Revival, Federal
- MPS: Rebuilding St. Georges Hundred 1850--1880 TR
- NRHP reference No.: 85002103
- Added to NRHP: September 13, 1985

Armstrong-Walker House is a historic home located near Middletown in New Castle County, Delaware, United States. It was built about 1870, and consists of a 2 1/2-story, five bay brick main block with a service ell and later frame kitchen addition. The house features an open front porch with square, paneled posts. Also on the property is a contributing braced frame stable.

It was listed on the National Register of Historic Places in 1985.
