= Edward H. and Bertha R. Keller House =

Historic building in Portland, Oregon, U.S.

- U.S. National Register of Historic Places
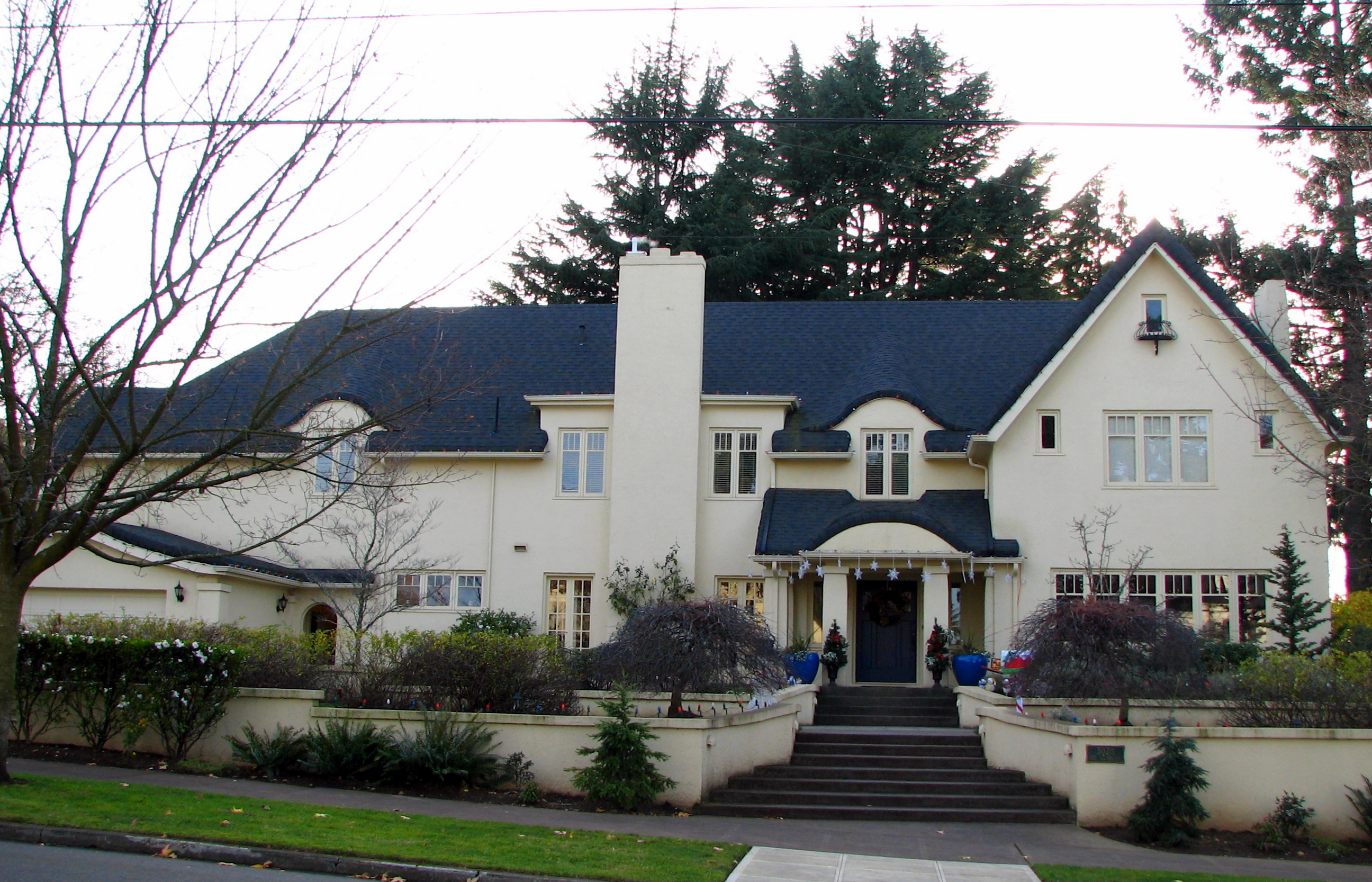
- Front exterior of the house in 2009

- Location within Portland, Oregon
- Location: 3028 NE Alameda Street; Portland, Oregon
- Coordinates: 45°32′59″N 122°38′06″W
- Area: less than one acre
- Built: 1924
- Built by: Clement Clark
- Architect: Elmer Feig
- Architectural style: English Cottage
- NRHP reference No.: 09000943
- Added to NRHP: November 20, 2009

The Edward H. and Bertha R. Keller House is a house located in northeast Portland, Oregon, in the United States, listed on the National Register of Historic Places.

An early example of the work of Elmer Feig and one of only seven known single-family residences designed by Feig, the house is an English Cottage Revival structure with a steep roof and rolled eaves meant to simulate a thatched roof, punctuated by eyebrow dormer windows. The house is considered the finest example of English Cottage Revival in the Alameda Neighborhood of northeast Portland. Feig estimated construction costs at $23,000.

== See also ==
- National Register of Historic Places listings in Northeast Portland, Oregon
