= A. Armstrong Farm =

Historic farm in Delaware, US

- U.S. National Register of Historic Places
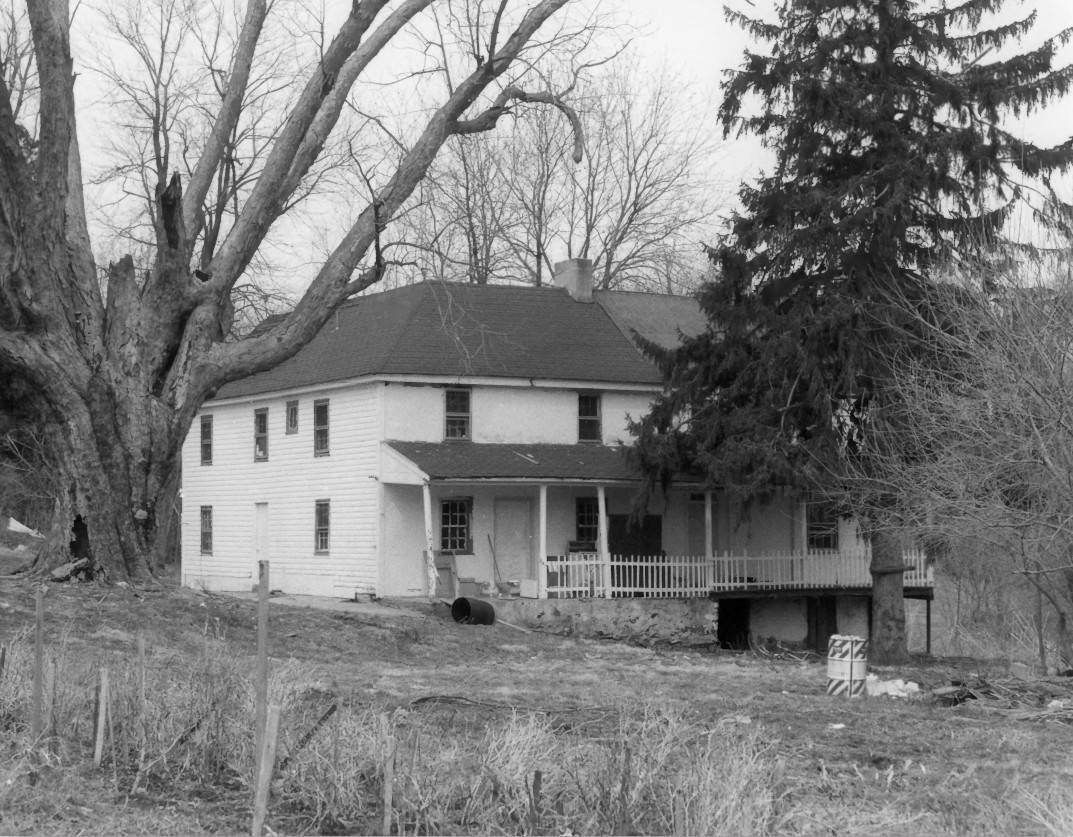

- Location within Delaware Location within the United States
- Location: Old Wilmington Rd. W of Brackenville Rd., Hockessin, Delaware
- Coordinates: 39°47′11″N 75°40′28″W
- Area: 5.1 acres (2.1 ha)
- Built: c. 1835
- Architectural style: Tri-level barn
- MPS: Agricultural Buildings and Complexes in Mill Creek Hundred, 1800-1840 TR
- NRHP reference No.: 86003083
- Added to NRHP: November 13, 1986

The A. Armstrong Farm was a historic farm located at Hockessin, Delaware, United States. The property included two contributing buildings. They were a log house with a stone addition added in the 1830s, and a frame tri-level stone and frame barn (c. 1830s). The stuccoed log section was three bays wide, and it had a two-story, two bay stone wing. The farm house and barn were demolished before 2002.

It was added to the National Register of Historic Places in 1986.
