= Robert and Esther Armstrong House =

Historic house in Iowa, United States

- U.S. National Register of Historic Places
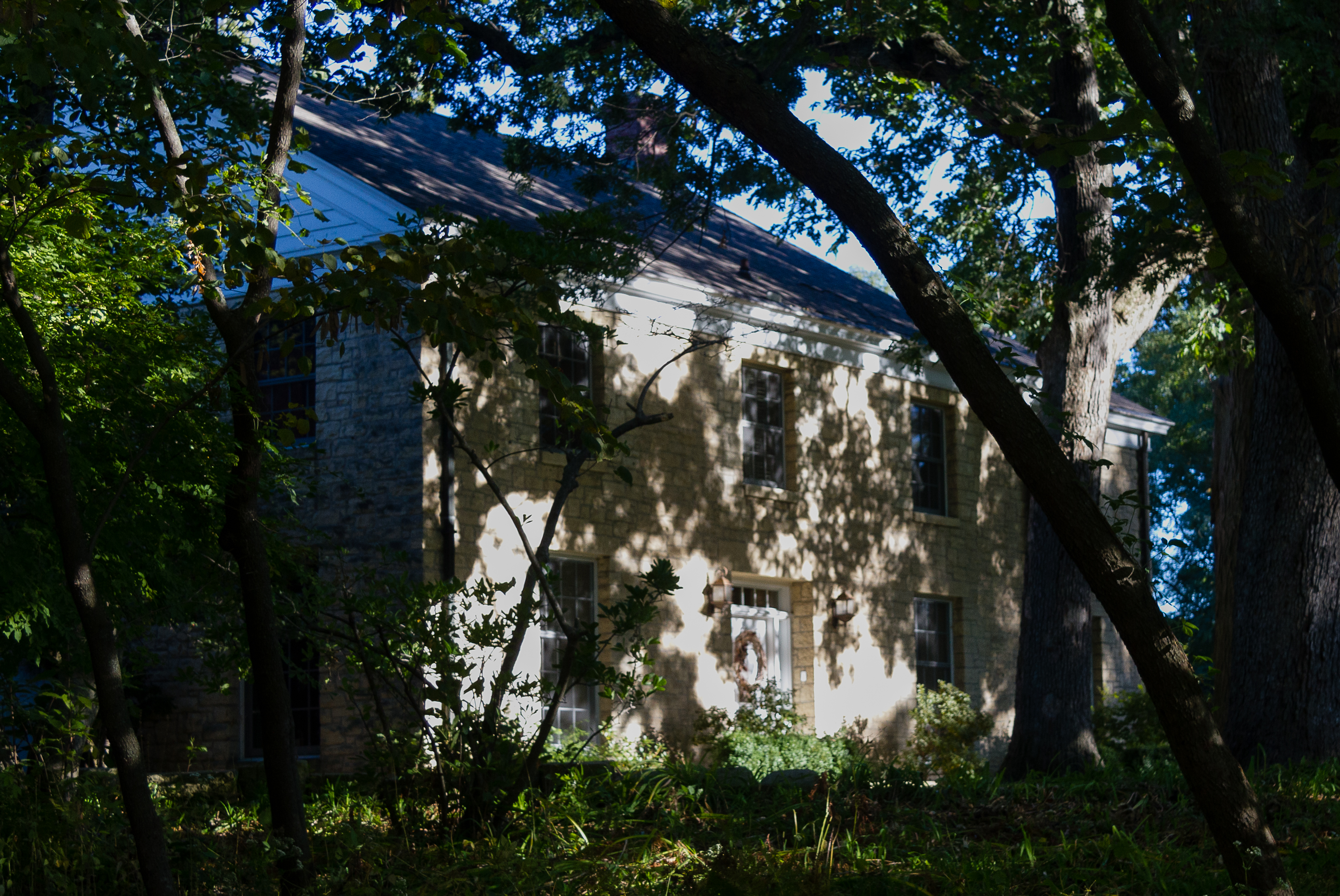

- Location within Iowa Location within the United States
- Location: 370 34th St., SE; Cedar Rapids, Iowa
- Coordinates: 41°59′5.3″N 91°37′2.7″W
- Area: 3.09 acres (1.25 ha)
- Built: 1933
- Architect: Grant Wood
- NRHP reference No.: 89002009
- Added to NRHP: November 16, 1989

The Robert and Esther Armstrong House, also known as Pleasant Hill, is a historic building located in Cedar Rapids, Iowa, United States. This is the last of two documented houses that regionalist artist Grant Wood designed in its entirety in the city. There are 14 documented houses that he designed, at least in part, between 1925 and 1933. He took on the work to help support himself and his mother. Like his artwork, his house designs evolved from more classical styles to the more simpler lines of vernacular forms. In addition, he used local materials to construct the house, including the exterior limestone quarried at Stone City for this house. In addition, Esther Armstrong, local builder Bruce McKay and Wood scoured the countryside looking for design ideas. They settled on two Pennsylvania-style fieldstone structures, from which Wood designed this home. He also served as interior decorator as well. The house was listed on the National Register of Historic Places in 1989.
