= Armstrong House (Britt, Iowa) =

1896 home in Britt, Iowa, United States

Coordinates: 43°05′43″N 93°47′54″W

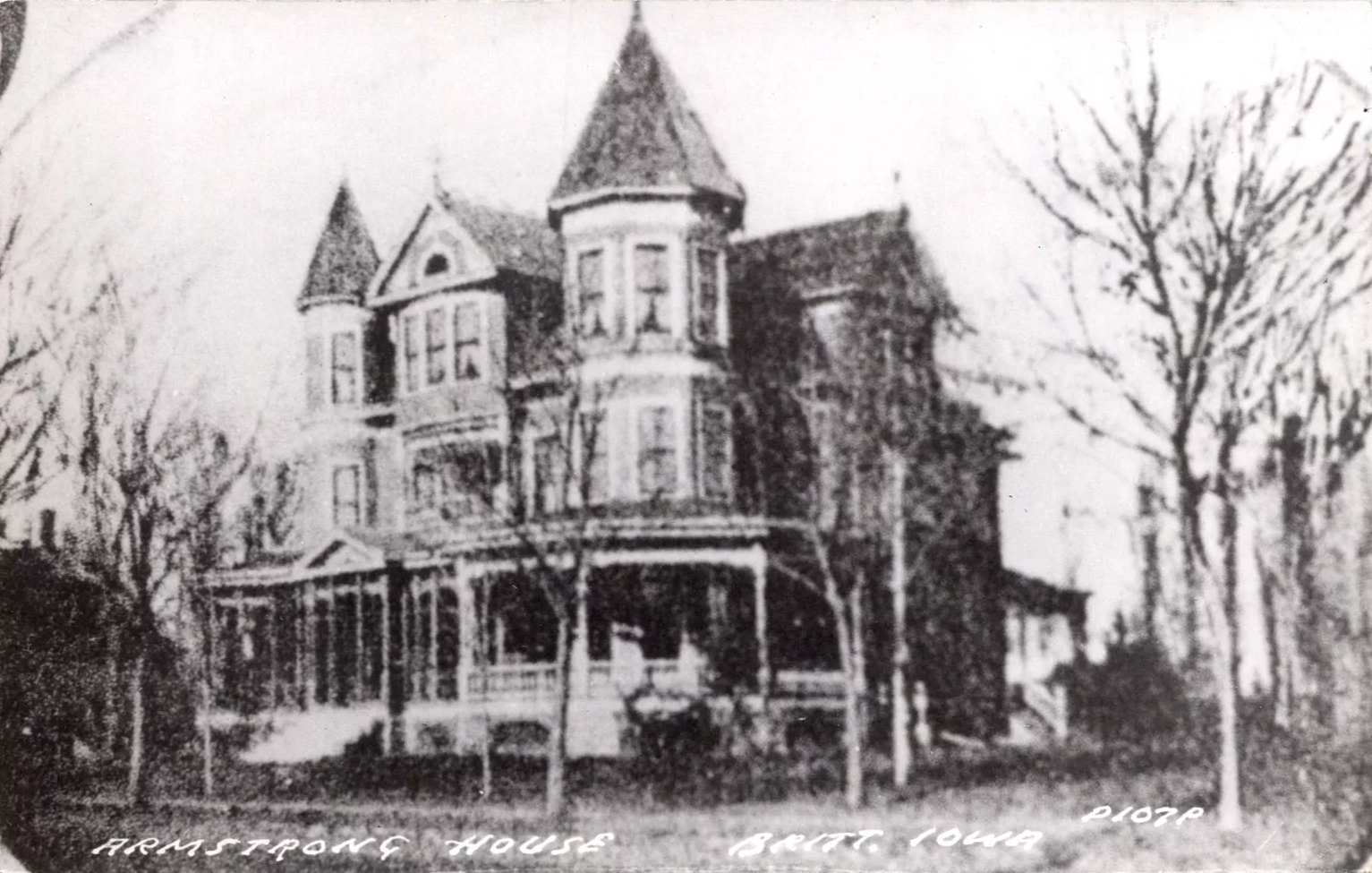
Early twentieth century postcard showing the house

The Armstrong House is an 1896 home in Britt, Iowa, United States. Commissioned by First National Bank president Lewis Larson and built by John Victoria, the historic house combines Colonial Revival and Queen Anne style architecture. The multistory home has two towers, a wraparound porch, hand-carved woodwork, and stained glass windows. The building was purchased by another bank president, H. C. Armstrong, whose family later donated it to the Hancock County Historical Society. The house has operated as a museum since 1970. Its rooms contain furniture from the Victorian era, cabinets made by H. C Armstrong, and a desk and chairs that belonged to Iowa Governor John Hammill.

== History ==
First National Bank president Lewis Larson commissioned John Victoria to construct the house for $15,000 ($581,000 today), and Victoria completed the building by 1896. Larson was a Norwegian immigrant and hired Norwegian maids who immigrated to Iowa for the position. The maids shared a small bedroom on the second floor near private staircases that led directly down into the kitchen and up into the attic. Along with a butler's pantry (a transitional room between the cooking and dining areas), the staircases allowed the maids to work discreetly while the Larsons hosted guests. H. C. Armstrong purchased Larson's bank and his house in 1914. Armstrong's sons donated the house to the Hancock County Historical Society in 1969 to be converted into a museum. One year later, the Hancock County Memorial Museum opened to the public. The historical society has spent thousands of dollars to preserve the home. They recreated the original turrets for both of the house's towers at a cost of $15,000 in 2011. In 2019, the historical society celebrated the 50th anniversary of its acquisition of the house by hosting an open house and a murder mystery event based in the time of prohibition.

== Contents ==
The multistory house combines elements of Colonial Revival and Queen Anne style architecture. The building has two towers, a wraparound porch, and balconies. Its staircases and heavy doors are hand-carved from yellow pine and oak. The museum preserved cabinets Armstrong himself built for the house. Some upper windows are stained glass. The hall sink and Swedish-glazed fireplace are marble. Rainwater drains to a cistern in the basement, where there are also coal and fruit cellars.

Since conversion to a museum, the rooms feature various local antiques, memoirs, and historical accounts. Victorian-era furniture is used throughout the house. The library features a desk, chairs, and a Victor Talking Machine phonograph from former Iowa Governor John Hammill. The kitchen features a vintage wall telephone and a butter churn. The parlor features an organ, floor lamps made by Armstrong, and "Battenberg lace made by Mrs. Larson." In the attic, the museum displays miniature replicas of a rural school and church. In the basement, there is a foot-operated dental drill, vintage wooden frames to dry curtains, hay knives, and antique woodworking hand tools. Also on display is a "soap kettle and machines for cutting seed potatoes, making rope, and sharpening saw blades".
