= Armstrong House-Allen Academy =

- U.S. National Register of Historic Places
- Location within Texas
- Location: 1200 Ursuline, Bryan, Texas
- Coordinates: 30°40′35″N 96°21′43″W
- Area: 3.5 acres (1.4 ha)
- Built: c.1910
- Architectural style: Classical Revival
- MPS: Bryan MRA
- NRHP reference No.: 87001606
- Added to NRHP: September 25, 1987

The Armstrong House-Allen Academy, at 1200 Ursuline in Bryan, Texas, was built around 1910. It was listed on the National Register of Historic Places in 1987.

It is a two-and-a-half-story frame house with weatherboard siding. It has Classical Revival details.
