= Armstrong House (Ripley, West Virginia) =

Historic house in West Virginia, United States

- U.S. National Register of Historic Places
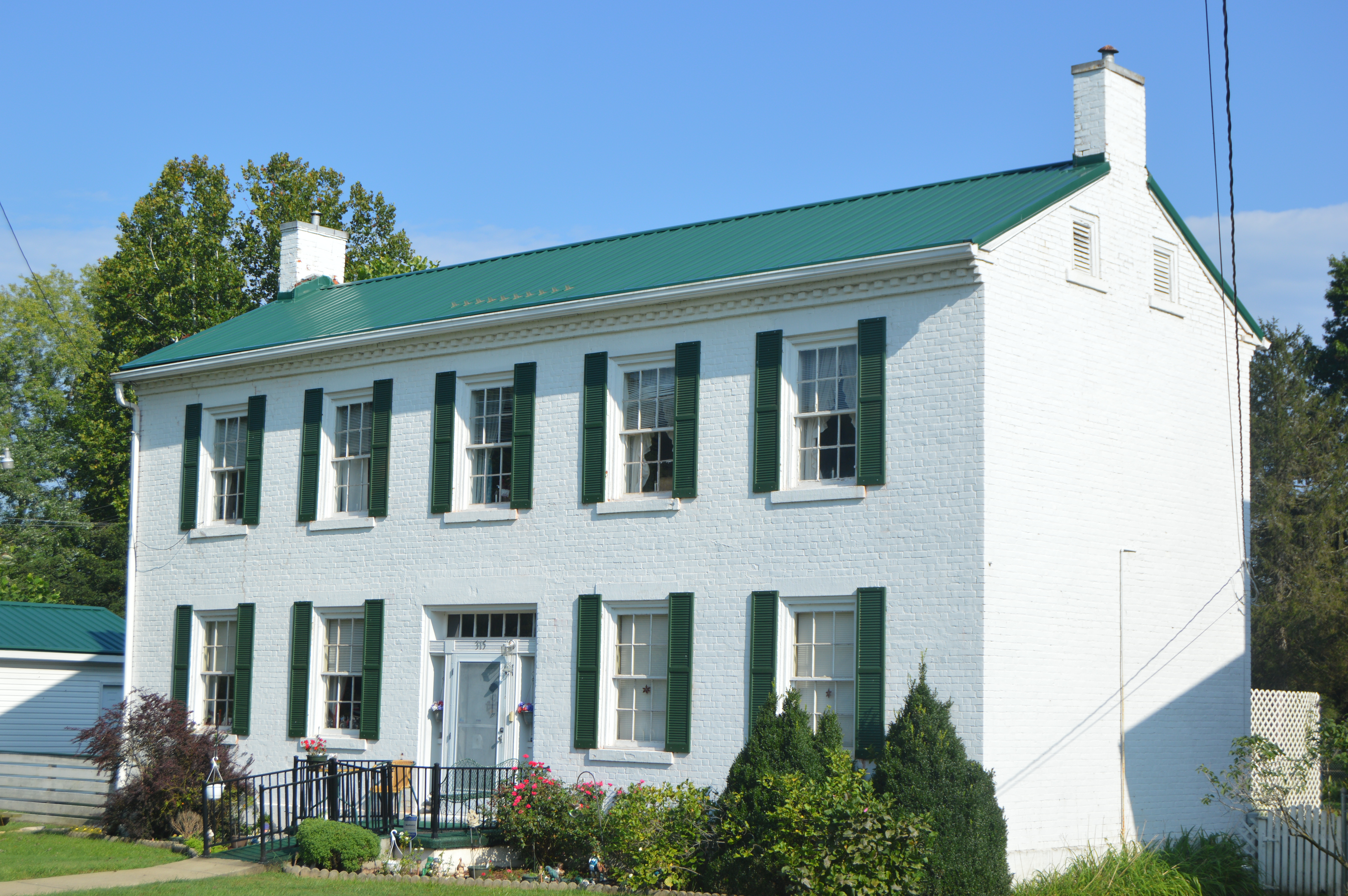
- Front and eastern side

- Location within West Virginia Location within the United States
- Location: 315 North St., Ripley, West Virginia
- Coordinates: 38°49′12″N 81°42′51″W
- Area: 0.3 acres (0.12 ha)
- Built: c. 1848
- Architectural style: Greek Revival
- NRHP reference No.: 80004023
- Added to NRHP: February 12, 1980

Armstrong House is a historic home located at Ripley, Jackson County, West Virginia. It was built about 1848, and is a two-story brick rectangle with a two-story ell (modified "T") in the Greek Revival style. It is the oldest house in Ripley.

It was listed on the National Register of Historic Places in 1980.
