= Elmer Feig =

American unlicensed architect

- Born: May 9, 1897; Atwater, Minnesota
- Died: October 20, 1968 (aged 71); Newberg, Oregon
- Education: University of Oregon
- Occupation: Architect
- Practice: Architectural Services Bureau, Portland, Oregon
- Buildings: Blackstone Apartments, Keller House
- Projects: Northwest District, Portland, Oregon
- Design: Egyptian Revival, Art Deco, Spanish Colonial

Elmer Edward Feig (May 9, 1897 - October 20, 1968) was an American unlicensed architect credited with designing over 81 apartment buildings between 1925 and 1931 in Portland, Oregon. Feig also designed single-family residences. Many of Feig's designs survived urban renewal and have become a central feature of Portland neighborhoods. Some of Feig's buildings are listed on the National Register of Historic Places.

== Early years ==
Elmer Edward Feig was born May 9, 1897, in Atwater, Minnesota. Within a few years, the family moved to Barnes County, North Dakota, where Elmer's father worked as a hardware store clerk. The family settled in Portland in 1910.

Feig's first job was as a draftsperson with the Portland firm of Fenner Redicut Homes in 1914. He began working as a structural and mechanical architect in Vancouver, Washington, for G. M. Standifer Construction Company in 1916 where he remained for three years. From 1919 to 1927, Feig worked as an inspector and plans examiner at the Portland City Bureau of Buildings, a forerunner of the Planning and Sustainability Commission. Feig designed the Keller House while working for the Bureau of Buildings.

Elmer Feig's first wife was Gladys Kunich, and they had two children. The Feigs divorced in the 1930s. Feig married his second wife, Dora, later in the 1930s.

== Architecture ==
In 1928, Feig started the Architectural Services Bureau and began working as a full-time architect, although he referred to himself as a building designer. One of his first commercial clients was Harry Mittleman, who constructed several apartment buildings from designs provided by Feig, including Blackstone Apartments. Blackstone is an Egyptian Revival structure cited as a key example of Feig's work. A typical Feig design included a raised basement, three to five stories, a flat roof, and parapets raised higher at the middle and the corners. Feig experimented with various revival styles where exotic motifs were applied to ordinary apartment structures, often including relief panels and cast stone decorations. The building form was also important to Feig, and he experimented with courtyards and gardens attached to U-shapes and L-shaped forms.

From the late-1920s to the early-1930s, Feig designed over 81 apartment buildings and at least seven houses. Normally working alone, Feig collaborated with Harry Herzog of the firm Bennes & Herzog on at least one design but at separate times.

== Later years ==
Little else is known of Elmer Feig. His work in Florida has not been documented, and his legacy will remain in the Portland neighborhoods where his buildings are cherished.

He returned to Oregon in 1965 and retired in Newberg. Elmer Feig died October 20, 1968.

== List of buildings ==
Many of Elmer Feig's designs have been demolished, but the following list from the Oregon Historic Sites Database and other sources includes at least most of those left standing.

Photograph	Year	Name	Address
	1931	Morland Apartments	1530 NE 10th Ave; Portland, Oregon
	1930	Marquam Manor	3211 SW 10th Ave; Portland, Oregon
	1928	Olympic Apartments	707 NW 19th Ave; Portland, Oregon
	1929	Worthington Apartments	708 NW 19th Ave; Portland, Oregon
	1929	Zenabe Court Apartments	708 NW 20th Ave; Portland, Oregon
	1928	Estelle Court Apartments	730 NW 20th Ave; Portland, Oregon
	1930	El Capitan Apartments	1620 NE 24th Ave; Portland, Oregon
	1932	Mt Tabor Park Apartments	911 SE 60th Ave; Portland, Oregon
	1930	Maravilla Apartments	2310 NE 8th Ave; Portland, Oregon
	1930	Blackstone Apartments	1831 SW 9th Ave; Portland, Oregon
	1924	Edward Keller House	3028 NE Alameda St; Portland, Oregon
	1927	Volunteers Of America Building	538 SE Ash St; Portland, Oregon
	1929	Laurelhurst Christian Church	1244 NE Cesar E Chavez Blvd; Portland, Oregon
	1931	Manhattan Apartments	2209 NW Everett St; Portland, Oregon
	1930	Premier Apartments	1983 NW Flanders St; Portland, Oregon
	1930	Eugene Apartments	2030 NW Flanders St; Portland, Oregon
	1929	The Rasmussen on Flanders	2509 NE Flanders St; Portland, Oregon
	1928	McKinney Apartments	2125 NW Glisan St; Portland, Oregon
	1928	Tallynor Apartments	2267 NW Glisan St; Portland, Oregon
	1929	The Rasmussen on Glisan	2512 NE Glisan St; Portland, Oregon
	1928	Santa Barbara Apartments	2052 SE Hawthorne Blvd; Portland, Oregon
	1929	Associated Oil Building	1801-1817 NW Irving St; Portland, Oregon
	1929	Loomis and Day House	1929 NW Irving St; Portland, Oregon
	1929	Walters Apartments	1943 NW Irving St; Portland, Oregon
	1928	Barcelona Apartments	1953 NW Irving St; Portland, Oregon
	1928	Edlefsen House	1963 NW Irving St; Portland, Oregon
	1927	Nordel Apartments	2166 NW Irving St; Portland, Oregon
	1929	Teshnor Manor	1944 NW Johnson St; Portland, Oregon
	1927	Kurdy Apartments	2355 NW Johnson St; Portland, Oregon
	1928	Harry Mittleman House	1631 NE Klickitat St; Portland, Oregon
	1930	Arenson Court Apartments	2533 NW Marshall St; Portland, Oregon
	1925	Ben Phillips House	1422 SE Palm St; Portland, Oregon
	1928	Queen Anne Apartments	2503 NW Raleigh St; Portland, Oregon
	1930	Lindquist Apartments	711 NE Randall St; Portland, Oregon
	1929	Rockaway Apartments	1410-1418 NE Schuyler St; Portland, Oregon
	1931	Broadmoor Golf Course Clubhouse	3509 NE Columbia Blvd; Portland, Oregon
	1928	Grieg Lodge/Norse Hall	111 N.E. 11th Ave; Portland, Oregon

== See also ==
- Architecture of Portland, Oregon
