= Springer Farm (Newark, Delaware) =

- U.S. National Register of Historic Places
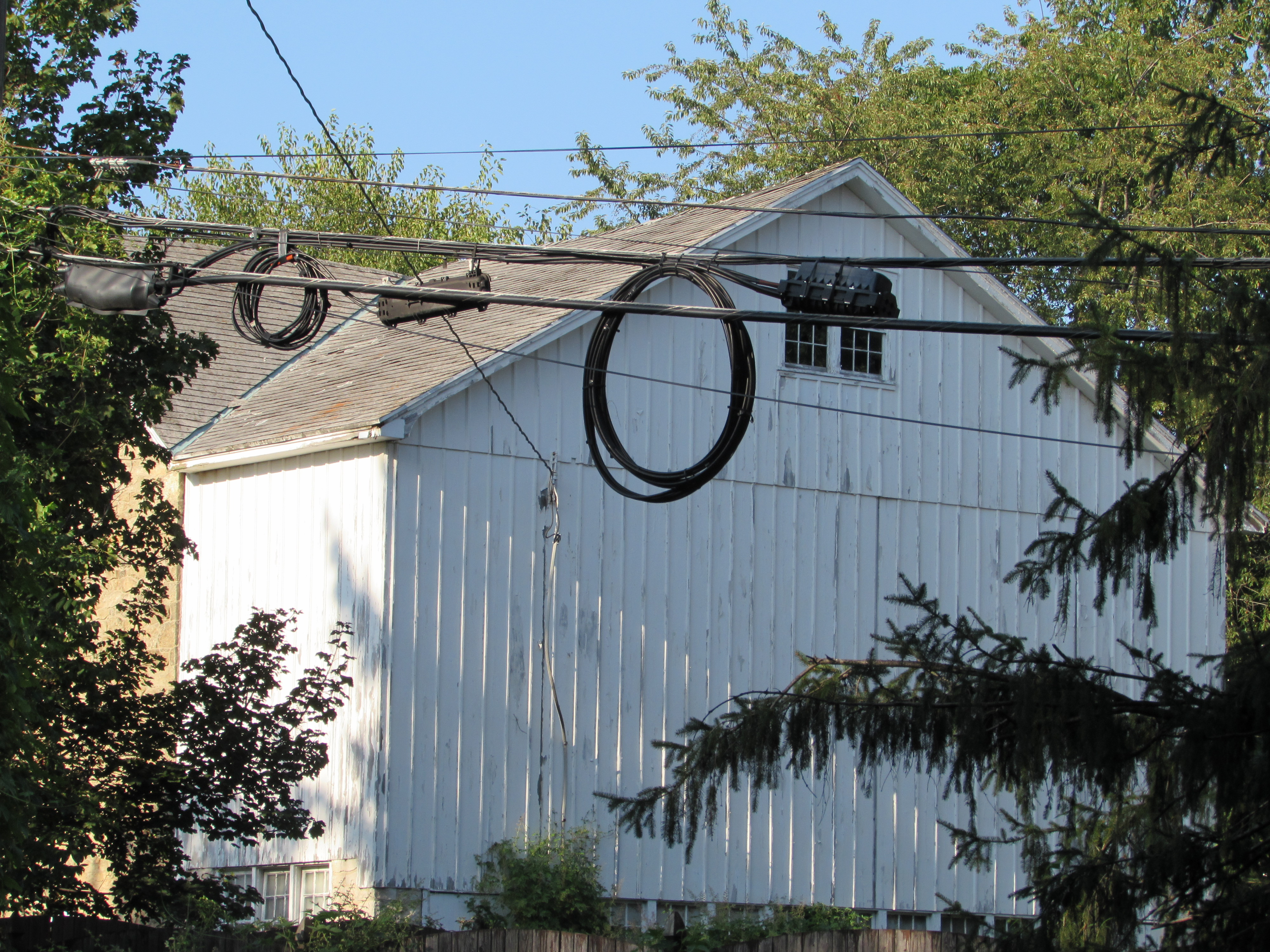
- Frame straw shed addition to the barn at the Springer Farm.

- Location within Delaware Location within the United States
- Location: 6621 Limestone Rd., Hockessin, Delaware
- Coordinates: 39.785733°N 75.724313°W
- Area: 19.3 acres (7.8 ha)
- Built: c. 1798
- Architectural style: Bi-level barn
- MPS: Agricultural Buildings and Complexes in Mill Creek Hundred, 1800--1840 TR
- NRHP reference No.: 86003103
- Added to NRHP: November 13, 1986

The Springer Farm is a historic farm located at Hockessin in New Castle County, Delaware, United States. The property includes four contributing buildings. They are a stone house (c. 1798), a stone and frame bank barn (c. 1820), a stone spring house, and a braced frame corn crib, both dated to the 19th century. The house is a two-story, gable-roofed, fieldstone structure on a coursed fieldstone foundation.

It was added to the National Register of Historic Places in 1986.
