= Alfred J. and Georgia A. Armstrong House =

Historic building in Portland, Oregon, U.S.

- U.S. National Register of Historic Places
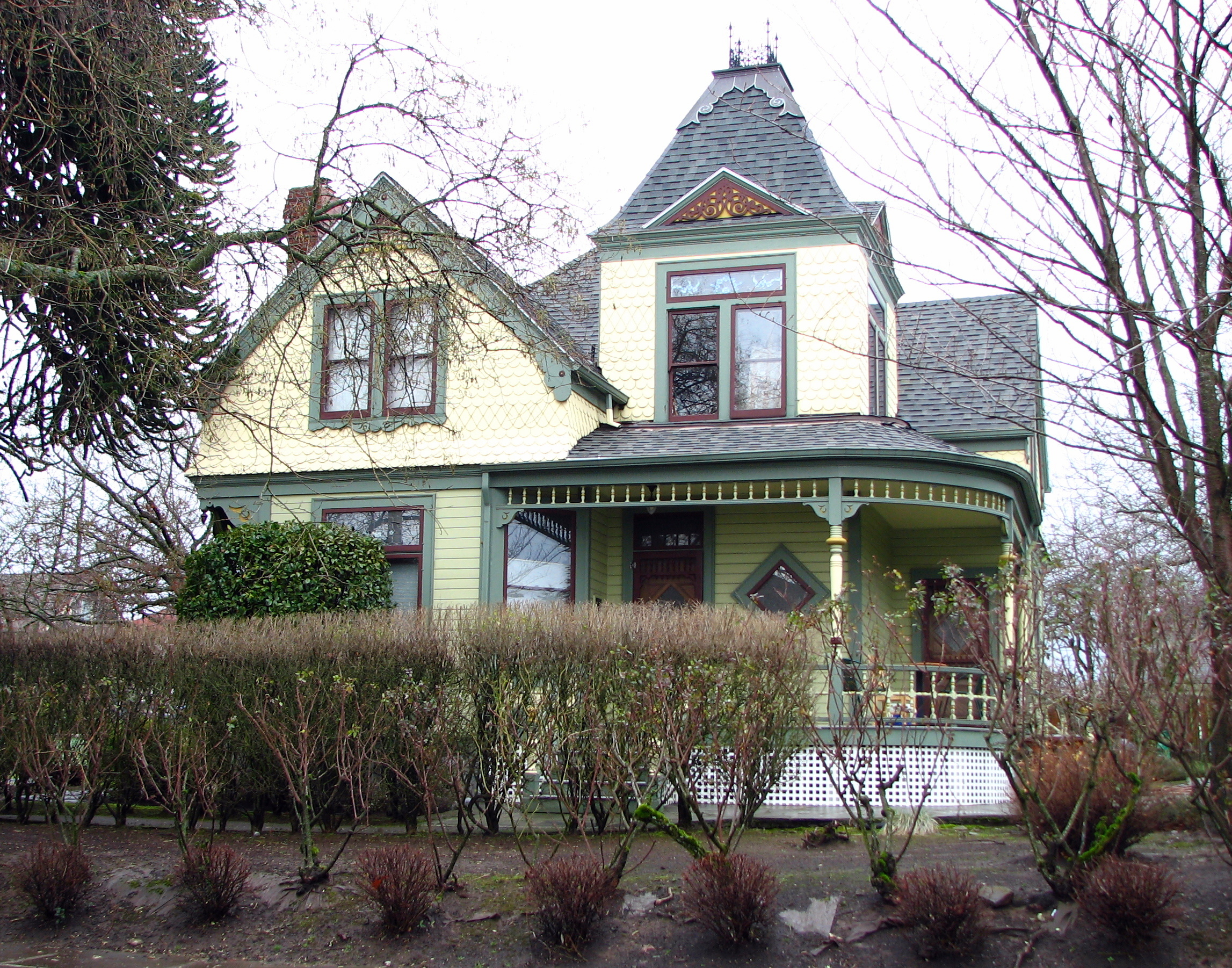
- Alfred J. and Georgia A. Armstrong House in 2010

- Location within the United States Location within Oregon Location within Portland, Oregon
- Location: 509 NE Prescott Street; Portland, Oregon
- Coordinates: 45°33′21″N 122°39′37″W
- Built: 1894–1895
- Architect: John T. Ferris
- Architectural style: Queen Anne
- NRHP reference No.: 02001017
- Added to NRHP: September 14, 2002

The Alfred J. and Georgia A. Armstrong House is a historic house in Portland, Oregon, United States. A modest but elaborate Queen Anne house built in 1894, it is one of very few intact examples of its type remaining from the early years of development in the King neighborhood. Likely constructed by one of its original occupants, a skilled carpenter, it exhibits more defining Queen Anne characteristics than other nearby houses of the same period, including a tower and the large quantity of jigsawed ornamentation. It was entered on the National Register of Historic Places in 2002.

== See also ==
- National Register of Historic Places listings in Northeast Portland, Oregon
