= Otterbein Church (Evans, West Virginia) =

Historic church in West Virginia, United States

- U.S. National Register of Historic Places
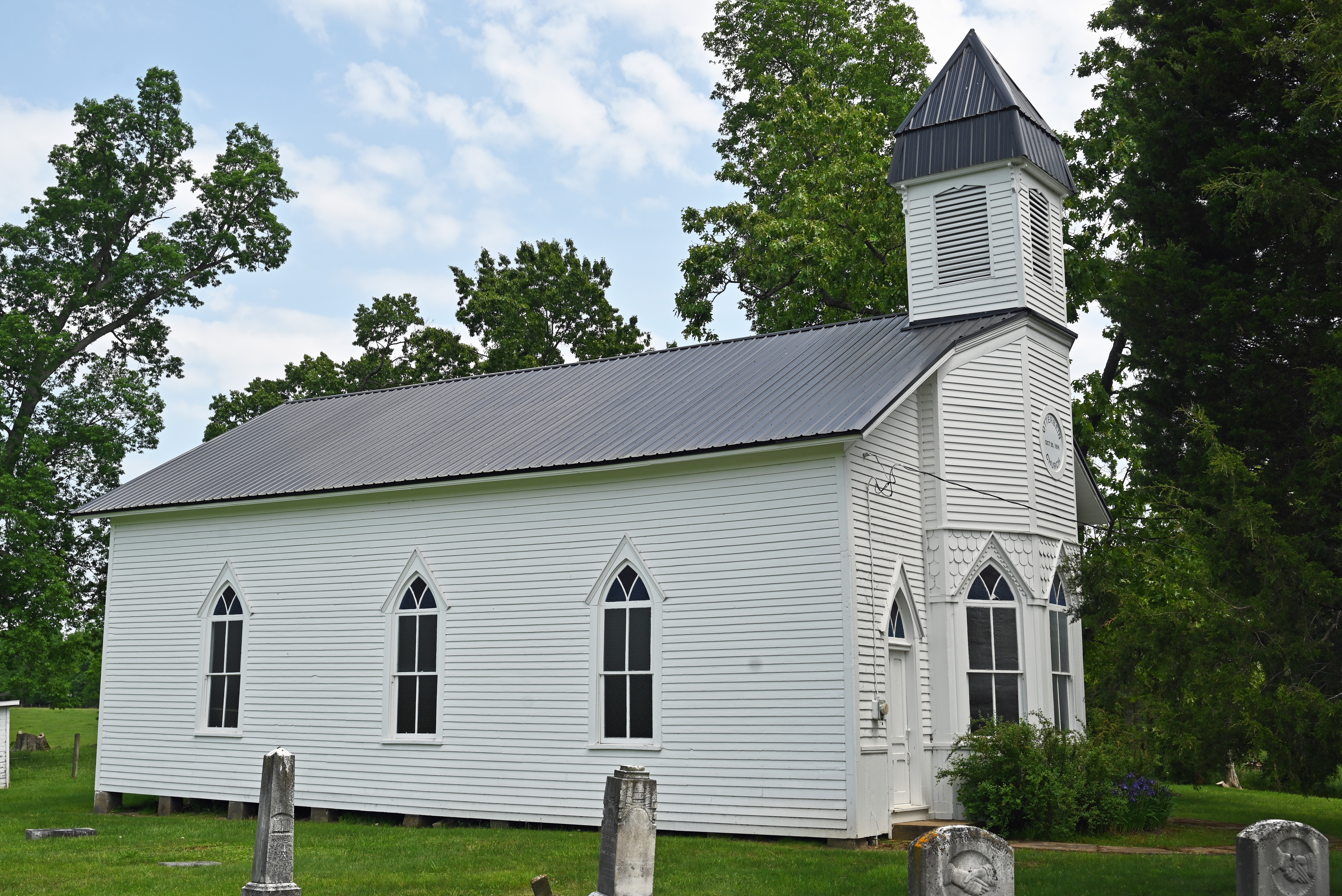
- Church in 2023

- Location within West Virginia Location within the United States
- Location: County Route 87/11, near junction with County Route 5, near Evans, West Virginia
- Coordinates: 38°49′54″N 81°47′36″W
- Area: 1 acre (0.40 ha)
- Built: 1896
- Architectural style: Late Gothic Revival
- NRHP reference No.: 98000286
- Added to NRHP: April 1, 1998

Otterbein Church, also known as Otterbein United Brethren Church, is a historic Methodist church near Evans, Jackson County, West Virginia. It was built in 1896, and is a single-story frame building sheathed in clapboard with a vertical wainscoting in the Late Gothic Revival-style. It features a square tower with rectangular vents on each side, small brackets, and a hipped-pyramidal roof. Also on the property is the church cemetery dating to roughly 1864.

It was listed on the National Register of Historic Places in 1998.
