= National Register of Historic Places listings in Atchison County, Kansas =

Location of Atchison County in Kansas

This is a list of the National Register of Historic Places listings in Atchison County, Kansas.

This is intended to be a complete list of the properties and districts on the National Register of Historic Places in Atchison County, Kansas, United States. The locations of National Register properties and districts for which the latitude and longitude coordinates are included below, may be seen in a map.

There are 52 properties and districts listed on the National Register in the county.

This National Park Service list is complete through NPS recent listings posted June 26, 2026.

== Current listings ==
	Name on the Register	Image	Date listed	Location	City or town	Description
1	Atchison Santa Fe Freight Depot	Atchison Santa Fe Freight Depot	October 11, 2001 (#01001090)	200 S. Tenth St. 39°33′36″N 95°07′36″W	Atchison	Today the Santa-Fe Depot Rail Museum
2	Atchison's Black Business District		August 12, 2025 (#100012099)	1118 North 7th Street; 39°34′27″N 95°07′18″W	Atchison	
3	Atchison County Courthouse	Atchison County Courthouse	April 16, 1975 (#75000704)	Southwestern corner of 5th and Parallel Sts. 39°33′58″N 95°07′10″W	Atchison	
4	Atchison County Memorial Hall	Atchison County Memorial Hall	April 18, 2007 (#07000317)	819 Commercial St. 39°33′44″N 95°07′27″W	Atchison	
5	Atchison Post Office	Atchison Post Office	March 16, 1972 (#72000484)	621 Kansas Ave. 39°33′48″N 95°07′18″W	Atchison	
6	Atchison YMCA	Atchison YMCA	April 13, 2020 (#100004203)	325 Commercial St. 39°33′43″N 95°07′02″W	Atchison	
7	Francis and Harriet Baker House	Francis and Harriet Baker House	August 28, 2003 (#03000838)	823 N. 5th St. 39°34′13″N 95°07′10″W	Atchison	
8	Benedictine College North Campus Historic Complex	Benedictine College North Campus Historic Complex	March 17, 1982 (#82002651)	2nd and Division Sts. 39°34′21″N 95°06′52″W	Atchison	
9	George T. and Minnie Searles Bolman House	George T. and Minnie Searles Bolman House	May 17, 2006 (#06000385)	418 N. 4th St. 39°33′57″N 95°07′03″W	Atchison	
10	Henry Braun House	Henry Braun House	May 17, 2006 (#06000387)	1307 Division St. 39°34′20″N 95°07′51″W	Atchison	
11	J. P. Brown House	J. P. Brown House	April 14, 1975 (#75000705)	805 N. 4th St. 39°34′10″N 95°07′05″W	Atchison	
12	Burnes Rental Houses Historic District	Burnes Rental Houses Historic District	December 6, 2005 (#05001361)	615, 617, and 621 N. 3rd St. 39°34′05″N 95°06′59″W	Atchison	
13	Campbell Chapel AME Church	Campbell Chapel AME Church	January 17, 2003 (#02001701)	715 Atchison St. 39°33′55″N 95°07′21″W	Atchison	
14	Central School	Central School	May 9, 2022 (#100007702)	215 North 8th St. 39°33′49″N 95°07′25″W	Atchison	
15	Chicago, Burlington & Quincy Railroad Freight Depot	Chicago, Burlington & Quincy Railroad Freight Depot	January 4, 2023 (#100008521)	118 South 2nd St. 39°33′39″N 95°06′55″W	Atchison	
16	John Drimmel, Sr. Farm	John Drimmel, Sr. Farm	May 20, 2004 (#04000452)	16339 290th Rd. 39°34′24″N 95°11′03″W	Atchison	
17	Amelia Earhart Birthplace	Amelia Earhart Birthplace	April 16, 1971 (#71000302)	223 N. Terrace; 39°33′50″N 95°06′52″W	Atchison	
18	Amelia Earhart Historic District	Amelia Earhart Historic District	February 1, 2002 (#01001543)	115-125, 200-227, 302-315, 318, 324 2nd St., 203-305 North Terrace, 124, 200, 300 3rd St., and 205, 112, and 224 Santa Fe St. 39°34′05″N 95°06′53″W	Atchison	
19	Ebenezer Baptist Church	Ebenezer Baptist Church	November 30, 2005 (#05001343)	826 Riley; 39°34′09″N 95°07′28″W	Atchison	
20	James M. Edmiston House	James M. Edmiston House	May 17, 2006 (#06000386)	311 S. 7th St. 39°33′33″N 95°07′18″W	Atchison	
21	First Presbyterian Church of Atchison		April 13, 2026 (#100012908)	302 N. 5th St. 39°33′51″N 95°07′09″W	Atchison	
22	Glancy/Pennell House	Glancy/Pennell House	August 26, 1983 (#83000416)	519 N. 5th St. 39°34′02″N 95°07′10″W	Atchison	
23	Glick-Orr House	Glick-Orr House	February 26, 1992 (#92000060)	503 N. Second St. 39°33′59″N 95°06′56″W	Atchison	
24	A. J. Harwi Hardware Company Building	A. J. Harwi Hardware Company Building	June 7, 2021 (#100006615)	832 Commercial Street; 39°33′43″N 95°07′30″W	Atchison	
25	A. J. Harwi House	A. J. Harwi House	May 6, 1975 (#75000706)	1103 Atchison St. 39°33′56″N 95°07′47″W	Atchison	
26	Hausner House	Hausner House	December 6, 2005 (#05001358)	400 N. 3rd St. 39°33′55″N 95°06′57″W	Atchison	
27	W. W. Hetherington House	W. W. Hetherington House	July 12, 1974 (#74000818)	805 N. 5th St. 39°33′49″N 95°07′08″W	Atchison	
28	Michael J. and Mattie Horan House	Michael J. and Mattie Horan House	May 17, 2006 (#06000384)	822 N. 4th St. 39°34′13″N 95°07′02″W	Atchison	
29	Frank Howard House	Frank Howard House	October 15, 1984 (#84000141)	305 N. Terrace; 39°33′51″N 95°06′52″W	Atchison	
30	Edgar W. Howe House	Edgar W. Howe House	June 7, 2021 (#100006616)	20045 266th Rd. 39°31′26″N 95°06′19″W	Atchison	
31	Edgar W. Howe House	Edgar W. Howe House	March 16, 1972 (#72000485)	1117 N. 3rd St. 39°34′28″N 95°07′01″W	Atchison	
32	Jansen House	Jansen House	December 6, 2005 (#05001360)	806 N. 3rd St. 39°34′12″N 95°06′58″W	Atchison	
33	Julius Kuhn Block		November 24, 2023 (#100009552)	731-733 Commercial Street, 106-110 North 8th Street; 39°33′43″N 95°07′25″W	Atchison	
34	Lanphear-Mitchell House	Lanphear-Mitchell House	December 6, 2005 (#05001359)	417 N. 4th St. 39°33′57″N 95°07′05″W	Atchison	
35	Lincoln School	Lincoln School	June 7, 2006 (#06000469)	801 Division St. 39°34′18″N 95°07′25″W	Atchison	
36	John A. Martin Grade School	John A. Martin Grade School	June 23, 2016 (#16000403)	507 Division St. 39°34′19″N 95°07′12″W	Atchison	
37	McInteer Villa	McInteer Villa	March 26, 1975 (#75000707)	1301 Kansas Ave. 39°33′48″N 95°08′01″W	Atchison	
38	Mount St. Scholastica Convent	Mount St. Scholastica Convent	April 13, 1972 (#72000486)	801 S. 8th St. 39°33′09″N 95°07′27″W	Atchison	
39	Mount Vernon Cemetery	Mount Vernon Cemetery	July 29, 2024 (#100010558)	6920 Rawlins Road; 39°32′30″N 95°08′33″W	Atchison	
40	H. E. Muchnic House	H. E. Muchnic House	July 12, 1974 (#74000819)	704 N. 4th St. 39°34′07″N 95°07′02″W	Atchison	
41	Anna & Richard Avery Park Mansion		August 12, 2025 (#100012100)	517 Parallel Street; 39°33′59″N 95°07′12″W	Atchison	
42	Robert L. Pease House	Robert L. Pease House	August 26, 1983 (#83000417)	203 N. 2nd St. 39°33′47″N 95°06′56″W	Atchison	
43	Price Villa	Price Villa	March 16, 1972 (#72000487)	801 S. 8th St. 39°33′13″N 95°07′30″W	Atchison	
44	Ronald and Dorcas Ramsay House	Ronald and Dorcas Ramsay House	June 7, 2006 (#06000470)	1415 Riverview Dr. 39°32′44″N 95°06′51″W	Atchison	
45	St. Patrick's Catholic Church	St. Patrick's Catholic Church	November 25, 1998 (#98001358)	234th Rd., 2 miles west of U.S. Route 73; 39°28′10″N 95°07′17″W	Atchison	
46	Schmitt House	Schmitt House	November 30, 2005 (#05001342)	1110 W. Division St. 39°34′18″N 95°07′51″W	Atchison	
47	Frederick W. Stein House	Frederick W. Stein House	January 14, 2004 (#03001391)	324 Santa Fe; 39°33′50″N 95°07′03″W	Atchison	
48	Stranger Creek Warren Truss Bridge	Stranger Creek Warren Truss Bridge	October 12, 2004 (#04001139)	On Haskell Rd., 0.8 miles south of the junction with 262 Rd., 0.5 miles south of Farmington; 39°30′41″N 95°18′36″W	Farmington	
49	Trinity Episcopal Church	Trinity Episcopal Church	April 4, 1985 (#85000692)	300 S. 5th St. 39°33′33″N 95°07′06″W	Atchison	
50	B. P. Waggener House	B. P. Waggener House	May 3, 1974 (#74000820)	819 N. 4th St. 39°34′13″N 95°07′04″W	Atchison	
51	Balie P. Waggener House	Balie P. Waggener House	May 17, 2006 (#06000388)	415 W. Riley St. 39°34′11″N 95°07′06″W	Atchison	
52	Wherrett-Mize Drug Company Building	Wherrett-Mize Drug Company Building	July 6, 2010 (#10000432)	201 Main St. 39°33′40″N 95°06′56″W	Atchison	

== See also ==
- List of National Historic Landmarks in Kansas
- National Register of Historic Places listings in Kansas
