= Stein House =

Stein House may refer to:

in the United States (by state, then city)

- Misty Mountain, Los Angeles, California
- Stein House (Ashland, Kansas), listed on the National Register of Historic Places
- Frederick W. Stein House, Atchison, Kansas, NRHP-listed
- Daniel Stein House, Farmerville, Louisiana, NRHP-listed
- David Bachrach House, also known as Gertrude Stein House, Baltimore, Maryland, NRHP-listed
- Earl Stein House, Midland, Michigan, NRHP-listed

== See also ==
- Stine House (disambiguation)
