= B. P. Waggener House =

Historic house in Kansas, United States

- U.S. National Register of Historic Places
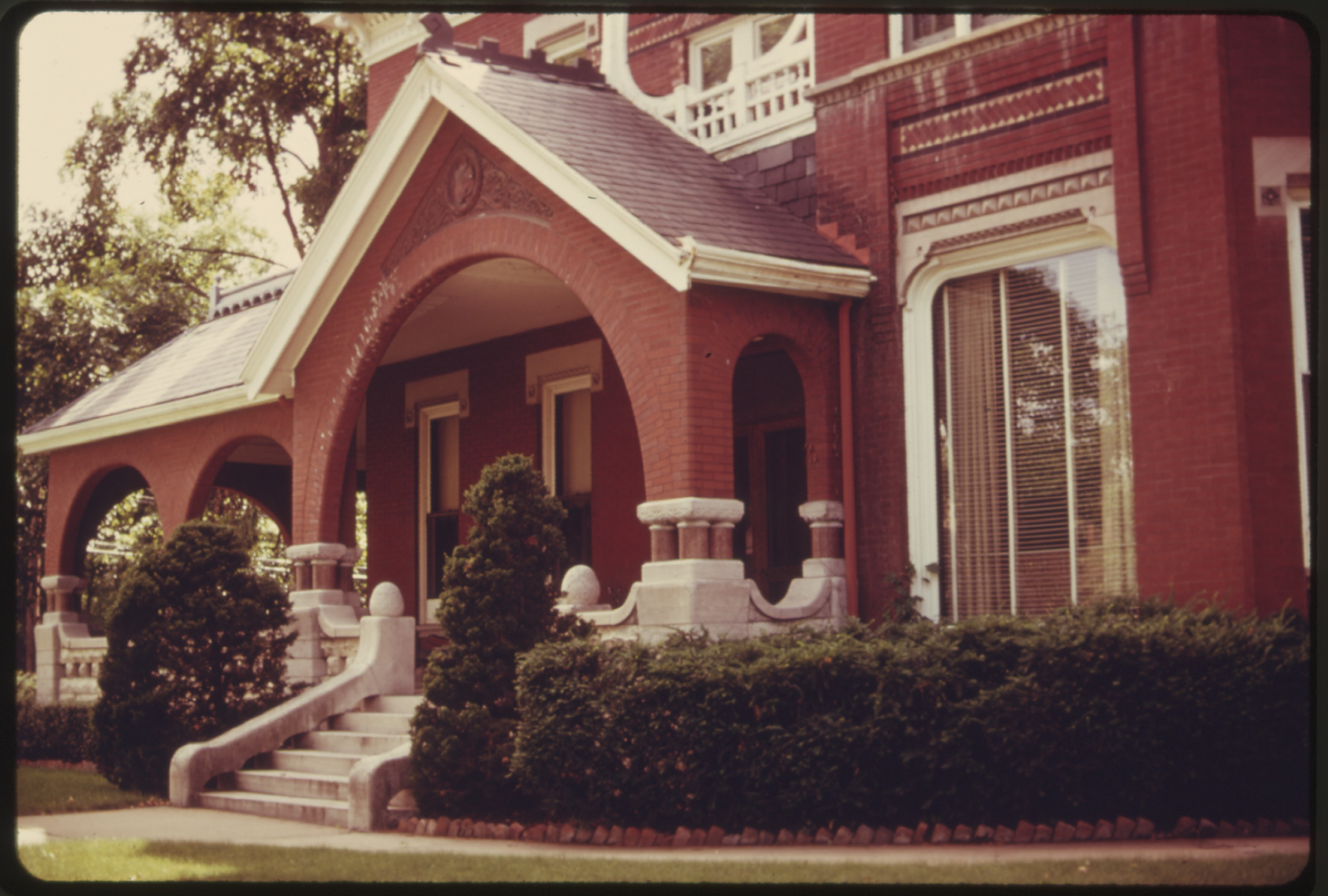

- Location within Kansas
- Location: 819 North 4th Street, Atchison, Kansas
- Coordinates: 39°34′13″N 95°07′04″W
- Area: 1 acre (0.40 ha)
- Built: 1884
- Architectural style: Late Victorian
- NRHP reference No.: 74000820
- Added to NRHP: May 3, 1974

The B. P. Waggener House is a historic three-story house in Atchison, Kansas. It was built in 1884 for Bailie P. Waggener, the general counsel of the Missouri Pacific Railroad. It was sold out of the Waggener family in the 1950s.

The house was designed in the Victorian architectural style. It has been listed on the National Register of Historic Places since May 3, 1974.
