= Stine House =

Stine House may refer to:

- L.L. Stine House, in Woodward, Oklahoma, listed on the National Register of Historic Places (NRHP)
- Stine House, predecessor to Dacres Hotel in Walla Walla, Washington

== See also ==
- Stine and McClure Undertaking Company Building, Kansas City, Missouri, NRHP-listed
- Stine Building, Alva, Oklahoma, NRHP-listed
- Stein House (disambiguation)
