= Frank Howard House =

Historic house in Kansas, United States

- U.S. National Register of Historic Places
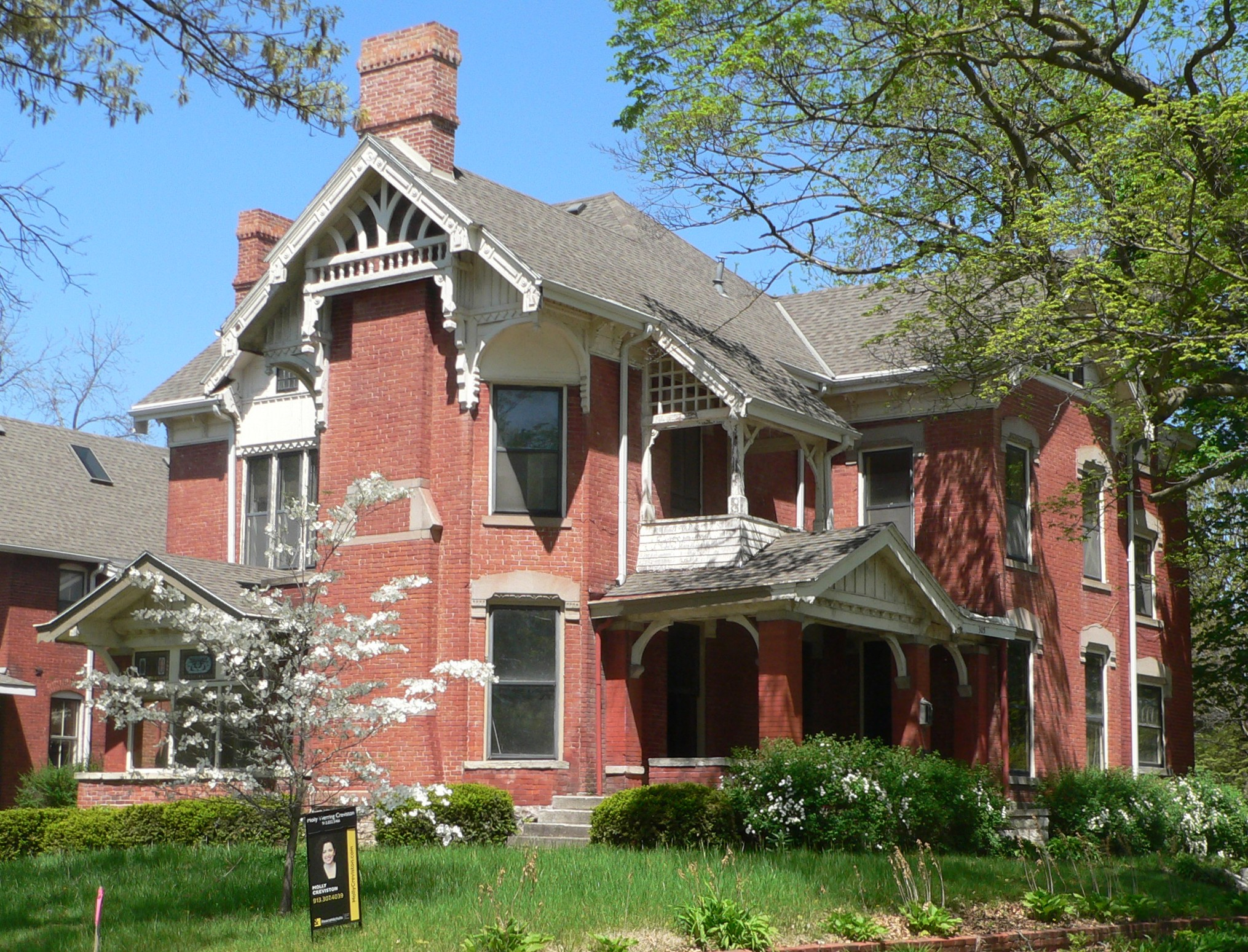

- Location within Kansas
- Location: 305 North Terrace, Atchison, Kansas
- Coordinates: 39°33′51″N 95°06′52″W
- Area: less than one acre
- Built: 1884
- Architect: H. B. Prudden
- Architectural style: Stick/eastlake
- NRHP reference No.: 84000141
- Added to NRHP: October 15, 1984

The Frank Howard House is a historic house in Atchison, Kansas. It was built in 1884-1885 for Frank Howard, a dry goods merchant and clothing manufacturer.

The house was designed by H. B. Prudden in the Stick-Eastlake architectural style. It has been listed on the National Register of Historic Places since October 15, 1984.
