= McInteer Villa =

Historic house in Kansas, United States

- U.S. National Register of Historic Places
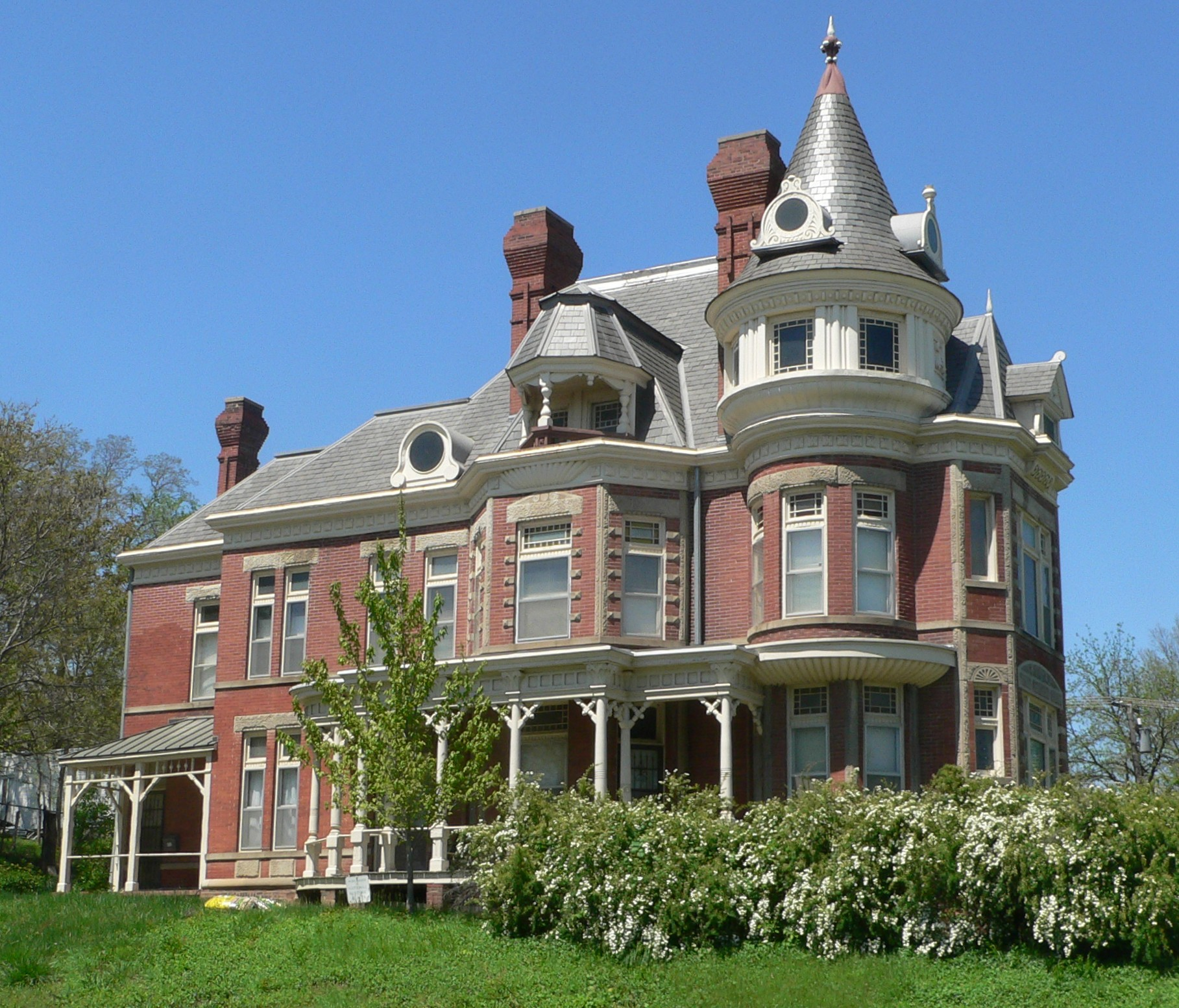
- The McInteer Villa in 2015

- Location within Kansas
- Location: 1301 Kansas Street, Atchison, Kansas
- Coordinates: 39°33′48″N 95°08′00″W
- Area: 1.5 acres (0.61 ha)
- Built: 1889
- Architectural style: Late Victorian
- NRHP reference No.: 75000707
- Added to NRHP: March 26, 1975

The McInteer Villa is a historic house in Atchison, Kansas. It was built in 1889-1890 for an Irish immigrant. It is listed on the National Register of Historic Places.

== History ==
The house was built in 1889-1890 for John McInteer, an Irish immigrant who made a fortune from selling harnesses and saddles. McInteer married twice, and the house was inherited after his death by his second wife, whose brother was Judge Charles J. Conlon. It was later acquired by Isabel Altus, "a retired professional violinist and an eccentric."

== Architectural significance ==
The house was designed in the Victorian architectural style. It has been listed on the National Register of Historic Places since March 26, 1975.
