= Robert L. Pease House =

Historic house in Kansas, United States

- U.S. National Register of Historic Places
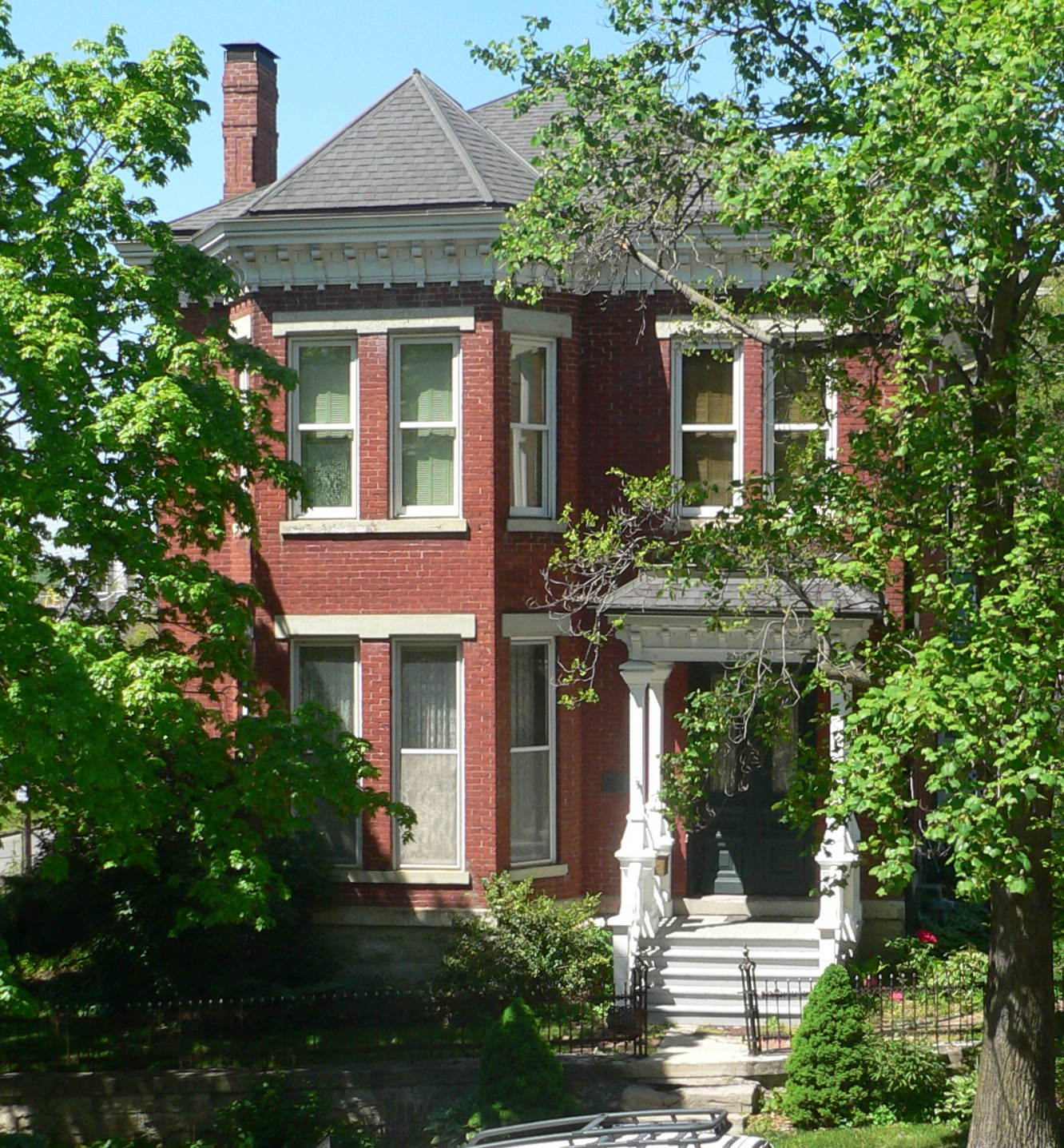
- The Robert L. Pease House in 2015

- Location within Kansas
- Location: 203 North 2nd Street, Atchison, Kansas
- Coordinates: 39°33′47″N 95°06′55″W
- Area: less than one acre
- Built: 1879
- Architectural style: Italianate
- NRHP reference No.: 83000417
- Added to NRHP: August 26, 1983

The Robert L. Pease House is a historic house in Atchison, Kansas. It was built in 1879 for Robert L. Pease, the cashier of the Bank of the State of Kansas. He later worked for the National Mail Company. Pease lived in the house with his wife, Amanda Van Atta Skidmore.

The house was designed in the Italianate architectural style. It has been listed on the National Register of Historic Places since August 26, 1983.

== History ==
The Robert L. Pease House was constructed for Mr. Pease and his bride in late 1879-1880. Pease was a prominent Atchisonian, involved with a variety of commercial ventures in his approximately 40 years there. His house, built in one man's version of the Italianate style, was indicative of his status in the community. Robert L. Pease arrived in Atchison in 1857 at the age of 25, three years after the town was founded. Atchison was a hub of transportation activity. Early in its history it was the eastern terminus of the overland wagon freighting industry. It did not take long for it to become a thriving railroad center supporting numerous wholesale and retail businesses. Upon his arrival in Atchison, Pease surveyed the vicinity of Atchison and platted several townsites in the county in partnership with one John J. Pratt. By 1860, Pease was agent for four national fire insurance companies, was selling real estate, and had completed a set of abstract books from the records at the U.S. Land Office in Leavenworth. He had been elected to the position of the City Register in September of 1858. The Kansas Territorial Legislature chartered the Kansas Valley Bank of Leavenworth in 1857. Intended in this charter were a headquarters bank in Leavenworth with branches at Atchison, Doniphan, Fort Scott, Lecompton, and Shawnee. Only the "branch" at Atchison ever materialized.

On January 25, 1861, the Legislature changed the name of the Atchison bank to the Bank of the

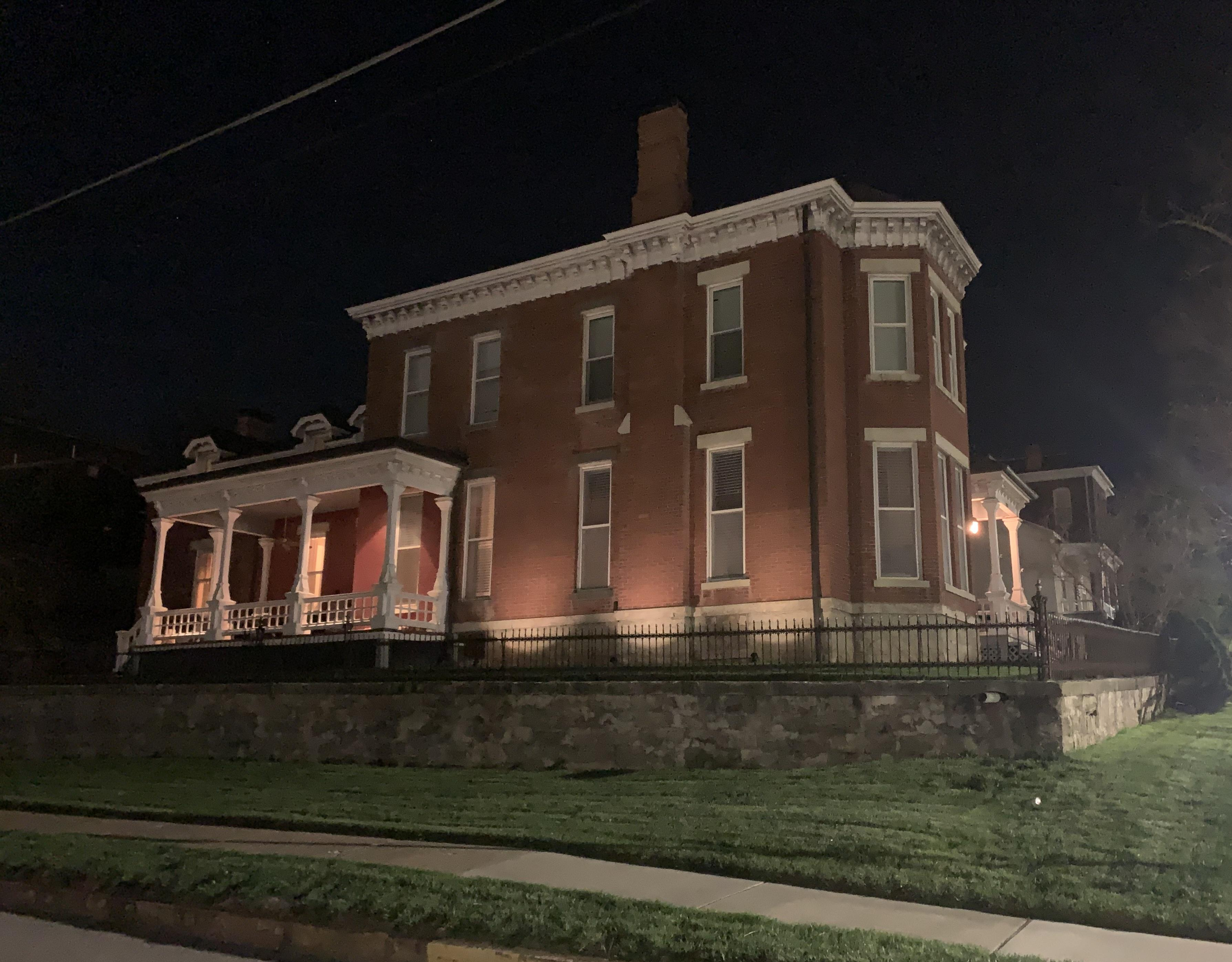

State of Kansas. Around that time Pease was named cashier. In 1862, Pease went to Denver to manage the office of the Overland State Line. He returned to Atchison in 1864 and reassumed his position as cashier of the bank. On March 16, 1866, Pease sold the capital stock of the bank at auction. The purchaser was William Hetherington, a dry goods merchant and private banker in town.

In 1868, Pease joined James Parker in the National Mail Company. This company, organized in 1867 by Parker and his father, was prime contractor for delivery of the U.S. mail west out of Atchison. The association with Parker lasted until 1886 when Pease was joined by his brothers Vashni and Albert. Pease retired from the company in 1897.

On October 19, 1878 Pease married Mrs. Amanda Van Atta Skidmore. The couple moved into the new home on Second street in early 1880. Their home was one of the social centers of the city in the 1880s and 1890s. A history of Northeastern Kansas published in 1900 noted that: "Mr. and Mrs. Pease occupy an enviable position in the social circles, and their home is celebrated for its hospitality, which is enjoyed by many of the best people in Atchison and this section of the state. The large Pease home was adapted to a long narrow city lot in a traditional side-hall parlor plan. Stylistically it tends toward the Italianate with its strong verticality, long narrow ground floor windows, two-story projecting bay and bracketed roof and porch cornices.
