= Balie P. Waggener House =

Historic house in Kansas, United States

- U.S. National Register of Historic Places
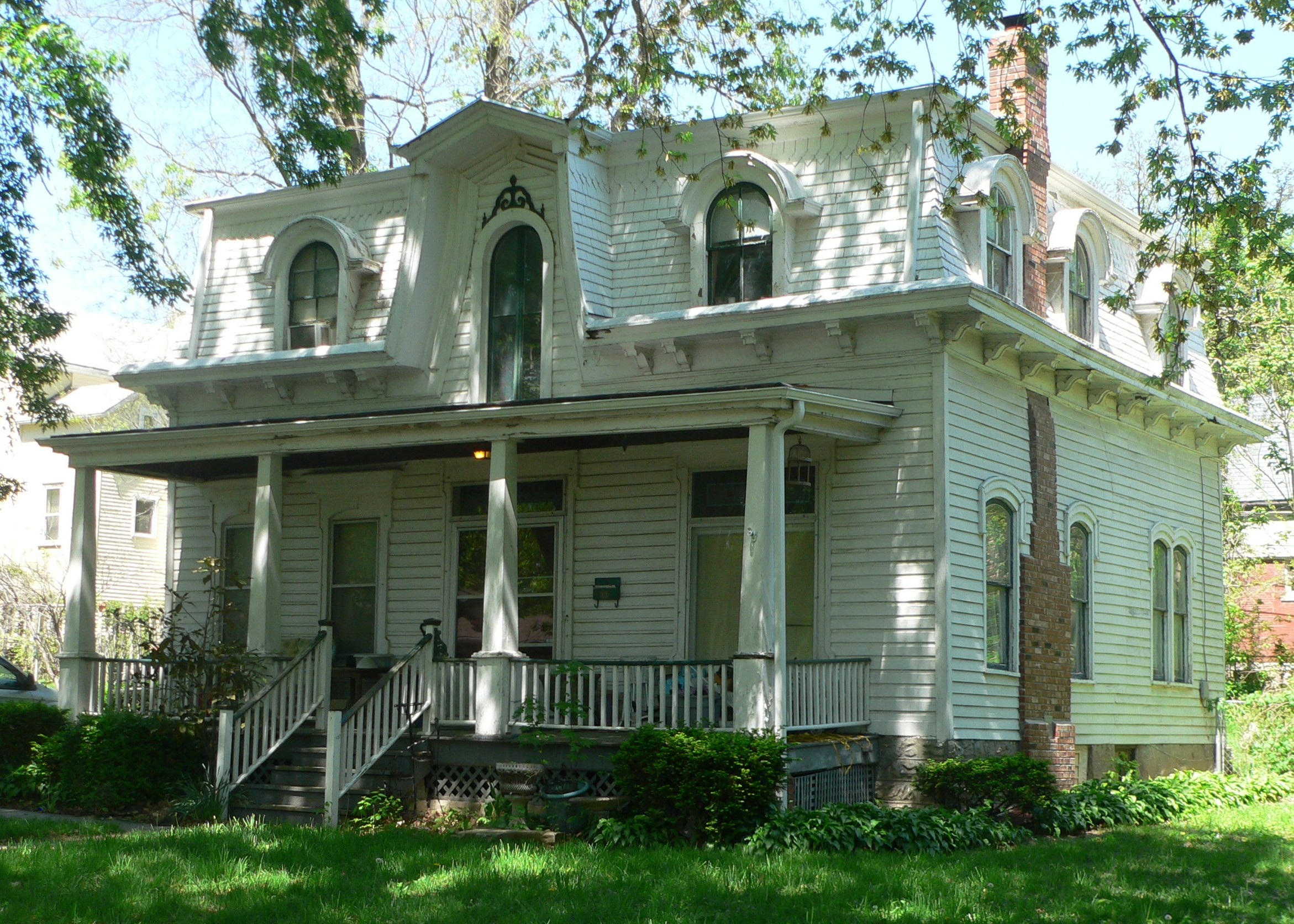
- The Balie P. Waggener House in 2015

- Location within Kansas
- Location: 415 W. Riley St., Atchison, Kansas
- Coordinates: 39°34′16″N 95°07′05″W
- Area: less than one acre
- Built: 1879
- Architectural style: Second Empire
- NRHP reference No.: 06000388
- Added to NRHP: May 17, 2006

The Balie P. Waggener House is a historic house in Atchison, Kansas. It was built in 1879 for the general counsel of the Missouri Pacific Railroad. It is listed on the National Register of Historic Places.

== History ==
The house was built in 1879 for Balie Payton Waggener, an attorney, and his wife, Emma L. Hetherington, whose father, William W. Hetherington, was the president of Atchison's Exchange National Bank. Waggener was the general counsel of the Missouri Pacific Railroad.

== Architectural significance ==
The house was designed in the Second Empire architectural style. It has been listed on the National Register of Historic Places since May 17, 2006.
