= Edgar W. Howe House =

Historic house in Kansas, United States

- U.S. National Register of Historic Places
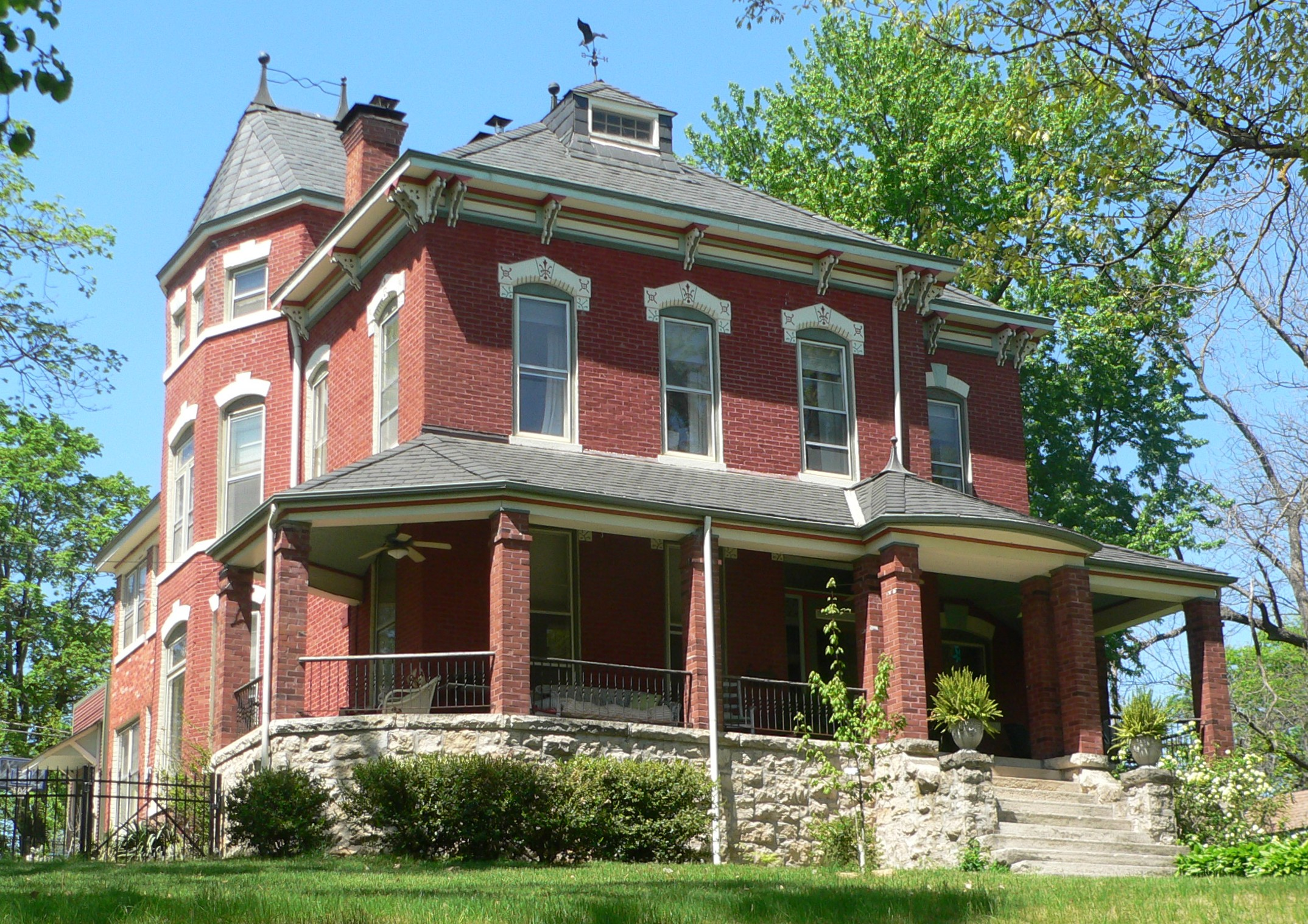
- The Edgar W. Howe House in 2015

- Location within Kansas
- Location: 1117 North 3rd Street, Atchison, Kansas
- Coordinates: 39°34′28″N 95°07′01″W
- Area: 2 acres (0.81 ha)
- Built: 1882
- Architectural style: Renaissance
- NRHP reference No.: 72000485
- Added to NRHP: March 16, 1972

The Edgar W. Howe House is a historic house in Atchison, Kansas. It was built for a newspaper editor. It is listed on the National Register of Historic Places.

== History ==
The house was built in 1882 for Edgar Watson Howe, the editor of the Atchison Daily Globe newspaper. Howe became known as "the best smalltown newspaper reporter in the nation." He died in 1937.

== Architectural significance ==
The house was designed in the Renaissance architectural style. It has been listed on the National Register of Historic Places since March 16, 1972.
