= Jansen House =

Historic house in Kansas, United States

- U.S. National Register of Historic Places
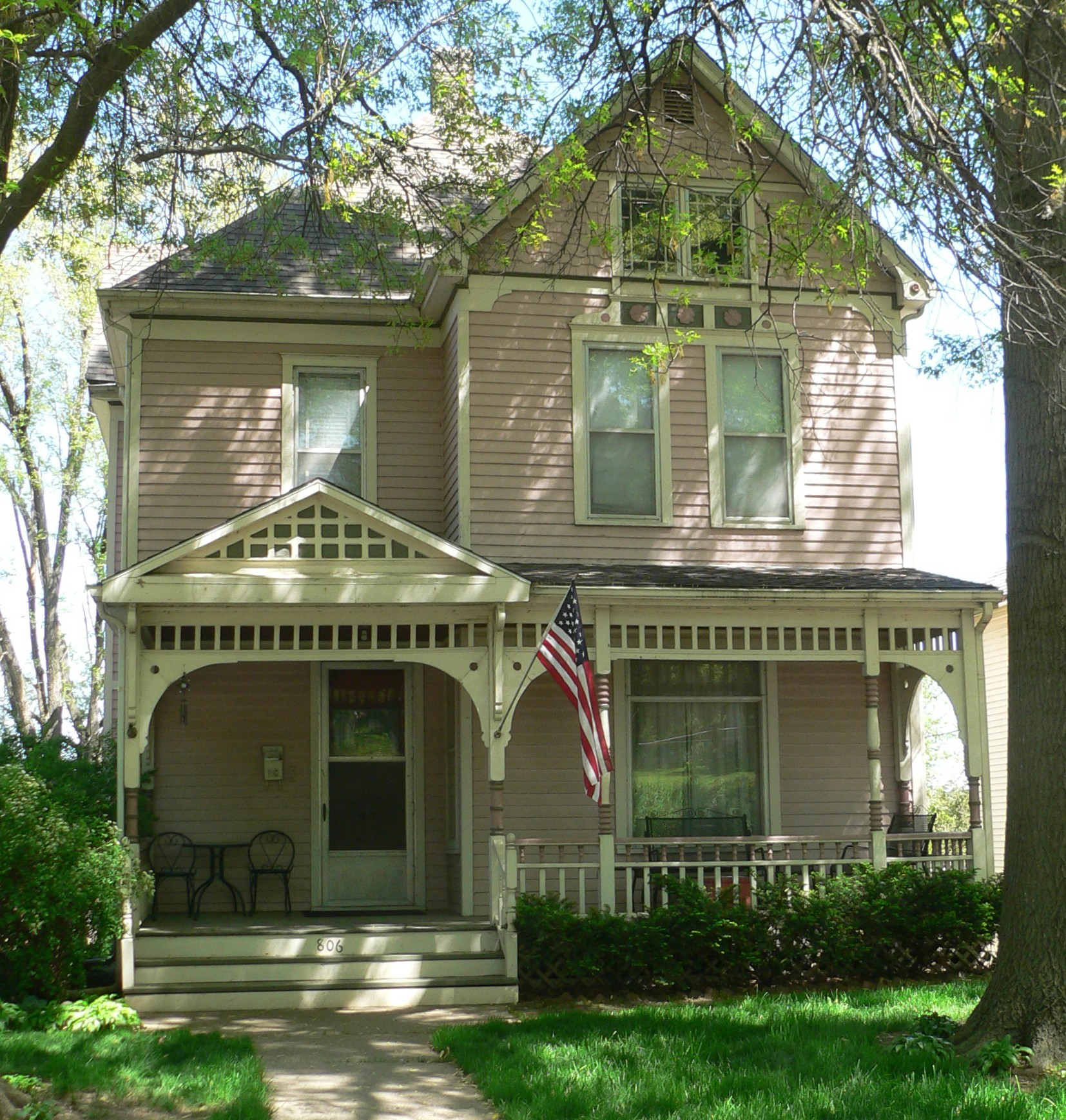
- The Jansen House in 2015

- Location within Kansas
- Location: 806 North 3rd Street, Atchison, Kansas
- Coordinates: 39°34′11″N 95°06′56″W
- Area: less than one acre
- Built: 1900
- Architectural style: Queen Anne
- NRHP reference No.: 05001360
- Added to NRHP: December 6, 2005

The Jansen House is a historic house in Atchison, Kansas. It was built in 1900 for John M. Price, a politician. It was acquired by Helen Jansen in 1903, and it remained in the same family until 1927. It belonged to the Linville-Leacy family from 1928 to 1983.

The house was designed in the Queen Anne architectural style. It has been listed on the National Register of Historic Places since December 6, 2005.
