= A. J. Harwi House =

Historic house in Kansas, United States

- U.S. National Register of Historic Places
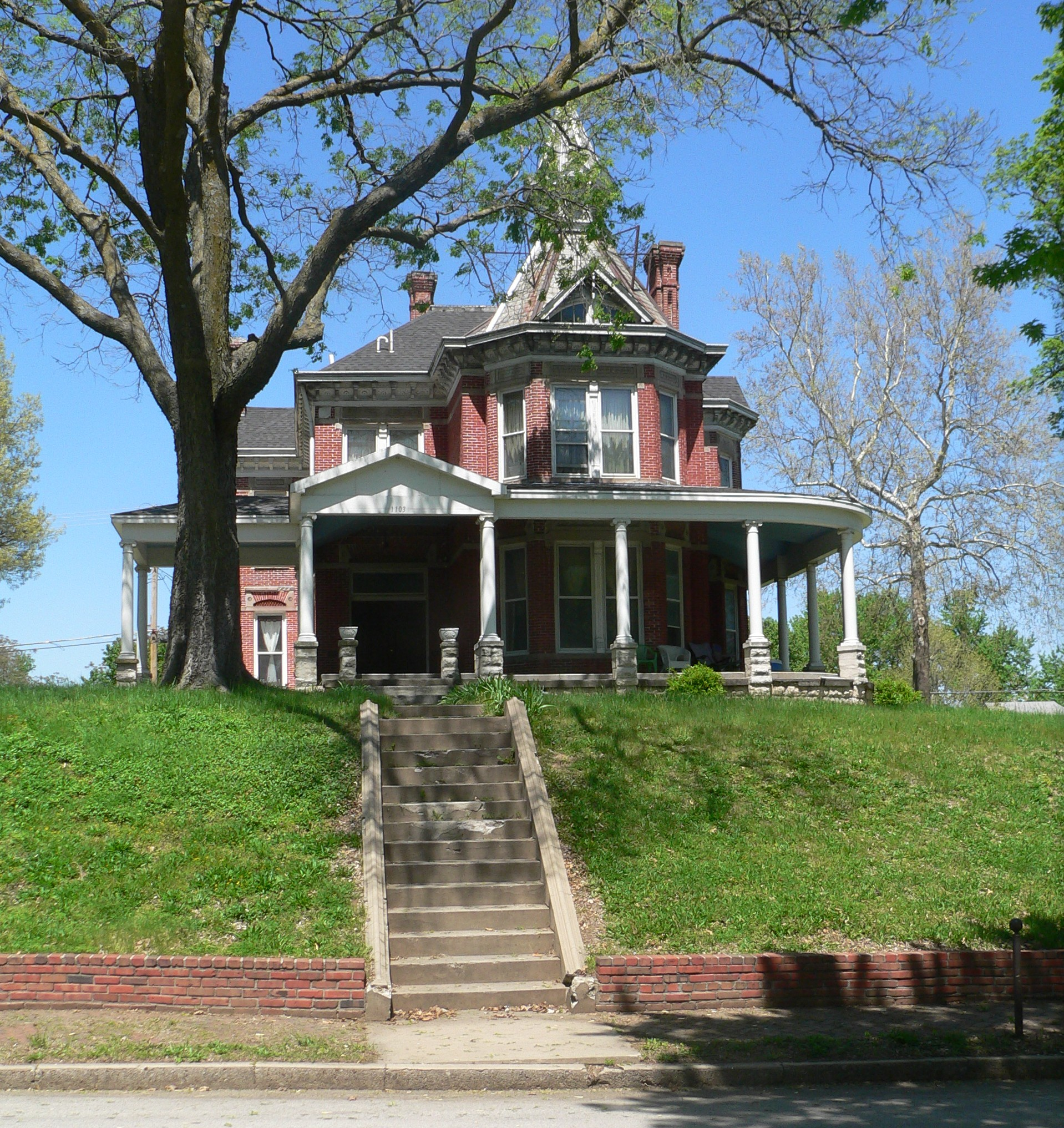
- The Harwi House in 2015

- Location within Kansas
- Location: 1103 Atchison Street, Atchison, Kansas
- Coordinates: 39°33′55″N 95°07′46″W
- Area: 1 acre (0.40 ha)
- Built: 1886
- Architectural style: Late Victorian
- NRHP reference No.: 75000706
- Added to NRHP: May 6, 1975

The A. J. Harwi House is a historic two-story house in Atchison, Kansas. It was built in 1886 for Alfred Jonathan Harwi, the founder of the A. J. Harwi Hardware and vice president of Atchison's Exchange National Bank. His son Frank purchased the Francis and Harriet Baker House, also listed on the NRHP.

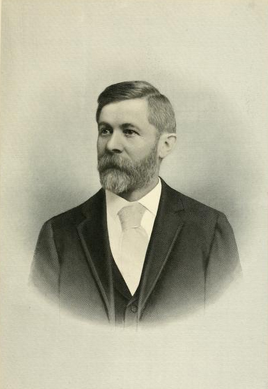
Alfred Jonathan Harwi (1916)

The house was designed in the Victorian architectural style. It has been listed on the National Register of Historic Places since May 6, 1975.
