= Price Villa =

Historic house in Kansas, United States

- U.S. National Register of Historic Places
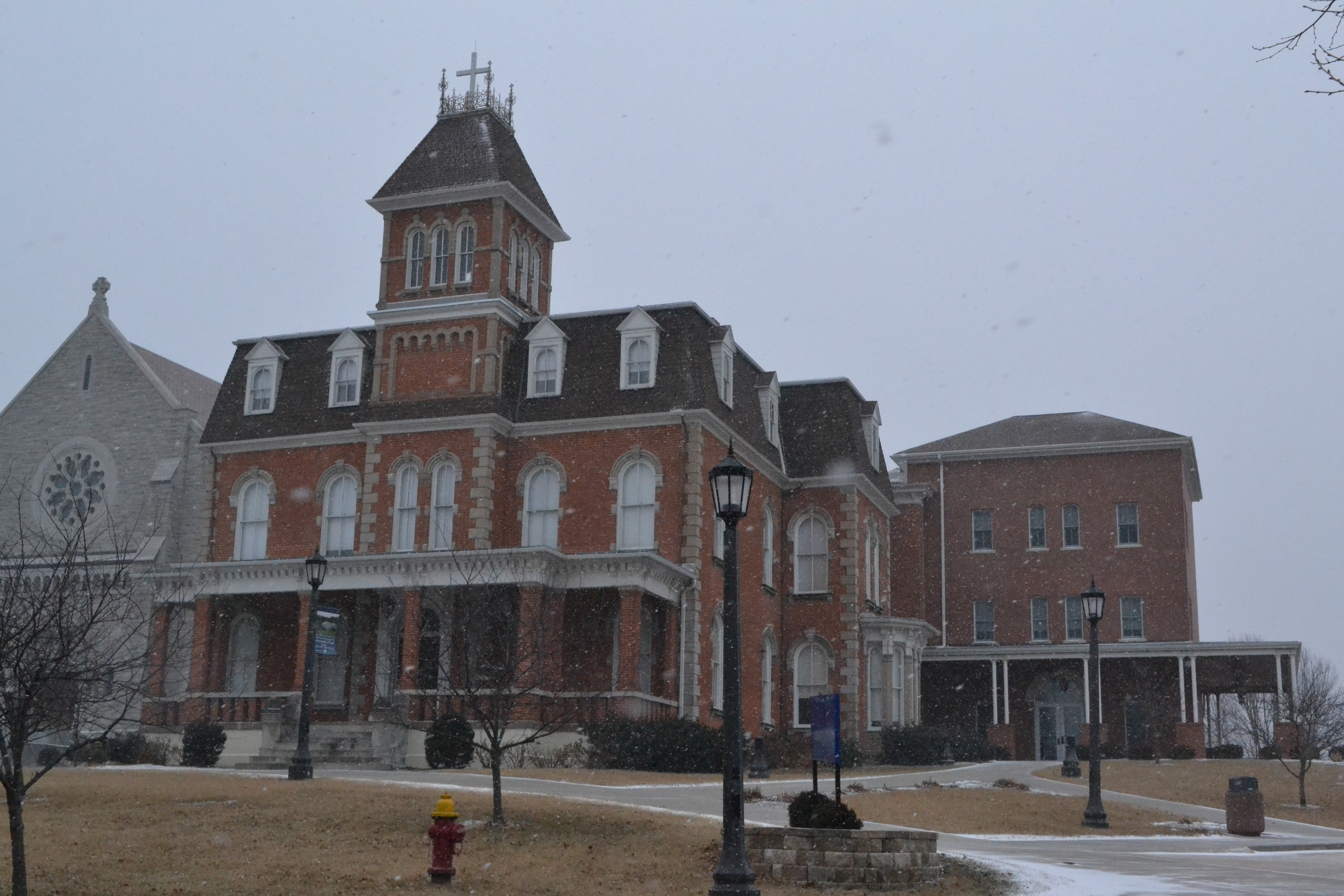
- The Price Villa in 2018

- Location within Kansas
- Location: 801 South 8th Street, Atchison, Kansas
- Coordinates: 39°33′13″N 95°07′30″W
- Area: 1 acre (0.40 ha)
- Built: 1872
- Architectural style: Renaissance
- NRHP reference No.: 72000487
- Added to NRHP: March 16, 1972

The Price Villa is a historic house in Atchison, Kansas. It was built in 1872 for John M. Price, a politician. It was acquired by the Benedictine Sisters of Mount St. Scholastica in 1877, and it became home to Mount St. Scholastica College's Music department.

The house was designed by architects Thomas Wise and F. W. MeLaughlif in the Renaissance style. It has been listed on the National Register of Historic Places since March 16, 1972.
