= W. W. Hetherington House =

Historic house in Kansas, United States

- U.S. National Register of Historic Places
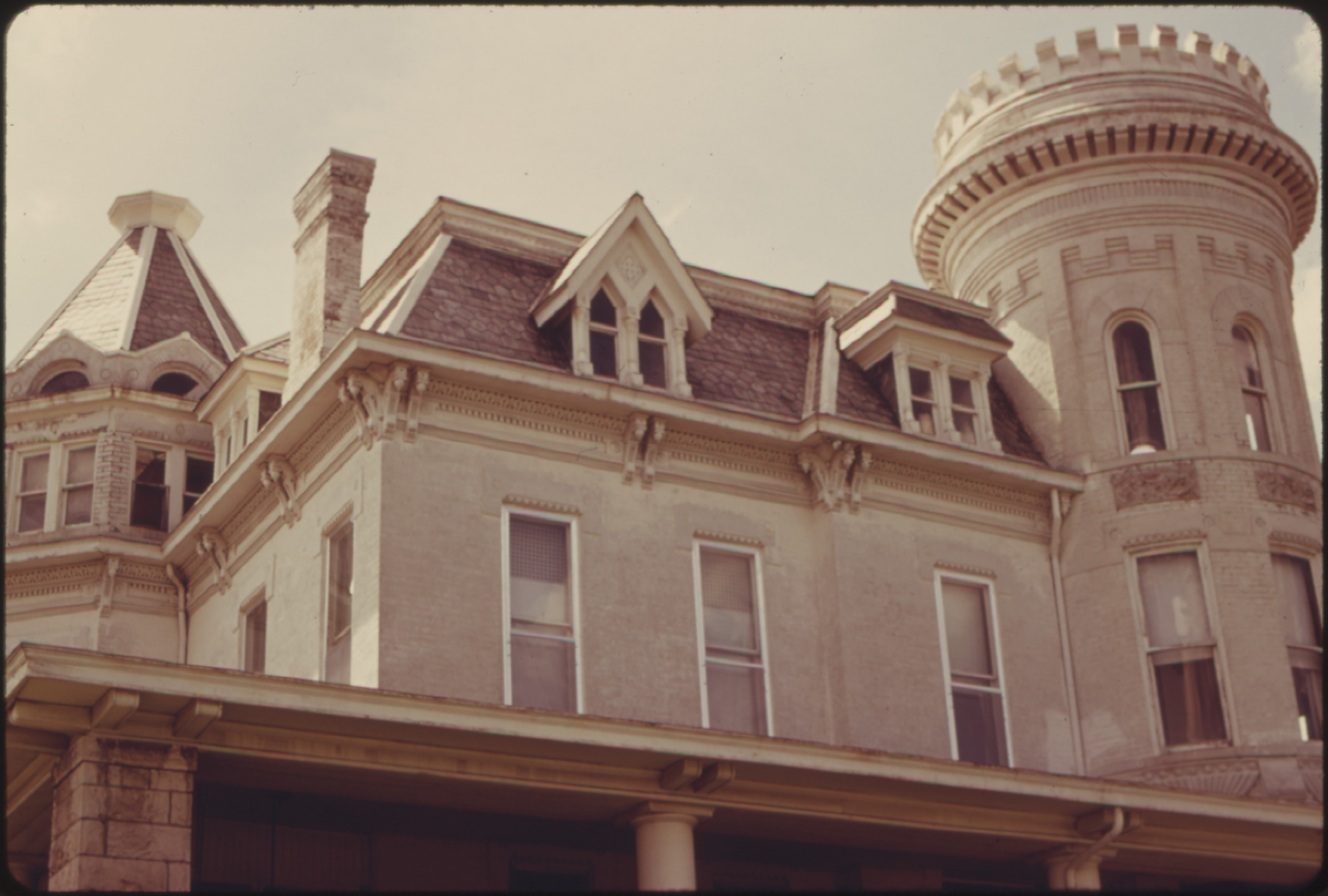

- Location within Kansas
- Location: 805 North 5th Street, Atchison, Kansas
- Coordinates: 39°33′49″N 95°07′08″W
- Area: 1 acre (0.40 ha)
- Built: 1879
- Architect: Alfred Meier
- NRHP reference No.: 74000818
- Added to NRHP: July 12, 1974

The W. W. Hetherington House is a historic house in Atchison, Kansas. It was built in 1879 for Webster Wirt Hetherington, the second president of Atchison's Exchange National Bank, founded by his father William.

The house was designed in the Romanesque architectural style by Alfred Meier. It has been listed on the National Register of Historic Places since July 12, 1974.
