= J. P. Brown House =

Historic house in Kansas, United States

- U.S. National Register of Historic Places
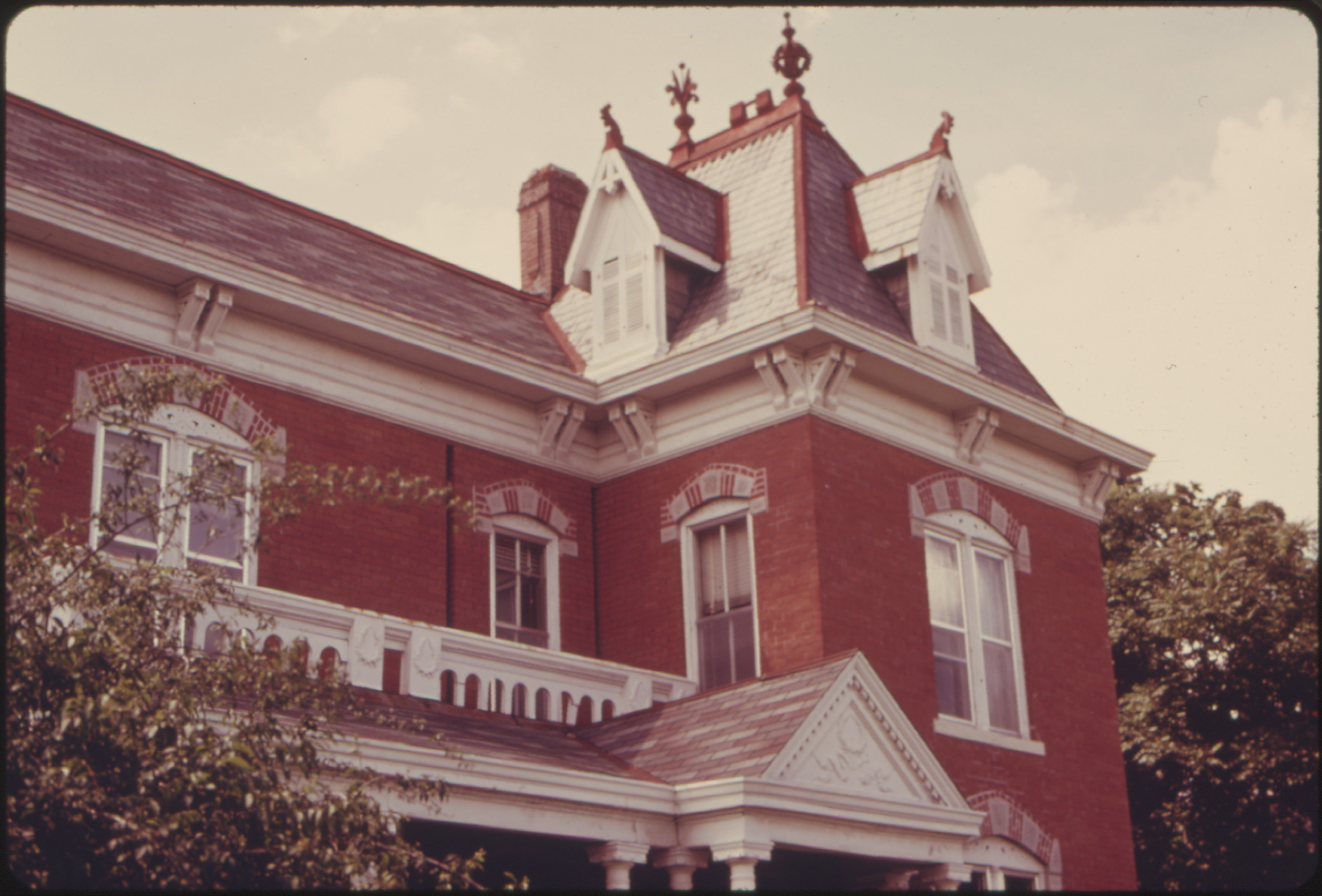

- Location within Kansas
- Location: 805 North 4th Street, Atchison, Kansas
- Coordinates: 39°34′10″N 95°07′05″W
- Area: 1.5 acres (0.61 ha)
- Built: 1880
- NRHP reference No.: 75000705
- Added to NRHP: April 14, 1975

The J. P. Brown House is a historic house in Atchison, Kansas. It was built in 1880 for John P. Brown, an Irish-born contractor for the Central Branch Union Pacific Railroad and one of Atchison's Exchange National Bank's largest shareholders. It has been listed on the National Register of Historic Places since April 14, 1975.
