= H. E. Muchnic House =

United States historic place and art gallery

- U.S. National Register of Historic Places
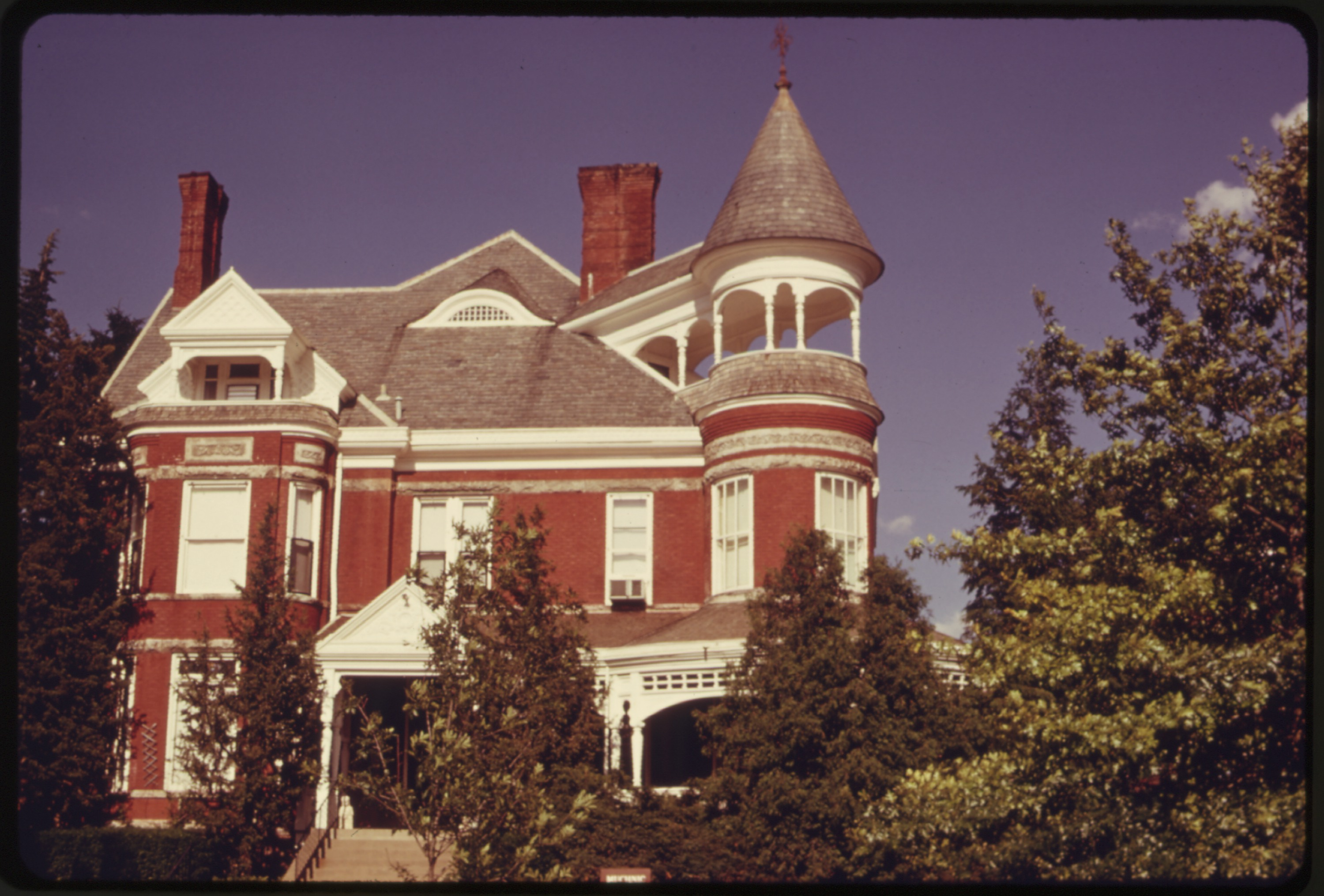

- Location within Kansas Location within the United States
- Location: 704 North 4th Street, Atchison, Kansas
- Coordinates: 39°34′07″N 95°07′02″W
- Area: 1 acre (0.40 ha)
- Built: 1887
- Built by: George W. Houghton, C.W. Benning (mason)
- Architect: W.F. Wood
- Architectural style: Late Victorian
- NRHP reference No.: 74000819
- Added to NRHP: July 12, 1974

The H. E. Muchnic House is a historic house in Atchison, Kansas. It was built in 1887-1888 for George W. Howell, a lumber dealer. It was purchased by Harry E. Muchnic, the founder of Locomotive Finished Material Company, in 1922. The company later merged with Rockwell International.

The house was designed in the Victorian architectural style. It has been listed on the National Register of Historic Places since July 12, 1974.
