= Donnelly College =

Private college in Kansas City, Kansas, U.S.

- Motto: "Lux Vera"
- Motto in English: "True Light" (John 1:9)
- Type: Private college
- Established: 1949
- Religious affiliation: Roman Catholic
- Endowment: $6,534,561
- President: Stuart Swetland
- Administrative staff: 111
- Students: 304
- Undergraduates: 294 total 179 full-time
- Location: Kansas City, Kansas, U.S.
- Campus: Urban
- Website: www.donnelly.edu

Donnelly College is a private Catholic college in Kansas City, Kansas. The college offers bachelor's, associate degrees, and Nursing certifications. It is the only college or university in the state designated as a Hispanic-serving institution (HSI) and a minority-serving institution (MSI).

== History ==
Donnelly College was established in 1949 by the Benedictine Sisters of Mount St. Scholastica and George Joseph Donnelly, Bishop of Kansas City, Kansas. The Benedictine Sisters provided the faculty for the college, which initially served as a two-year college.

Donnelly launched its first bachelor's degree program, Organizational Leadership, in 2006, and it is now known Business Leadership. Since then the college has added an additional bachelor's degrees in Information Systems.

In the fall of 2020 Donnelly transitioned into a new academic building.

Since 2001, Donnelly College has led a college in prison program. As of 2023, over 30 men have graduated from the Donnelly College in Prison program.
