= Benedictine Sisters of Mount St. Scholastica =

Benedictine educational community in Kansas

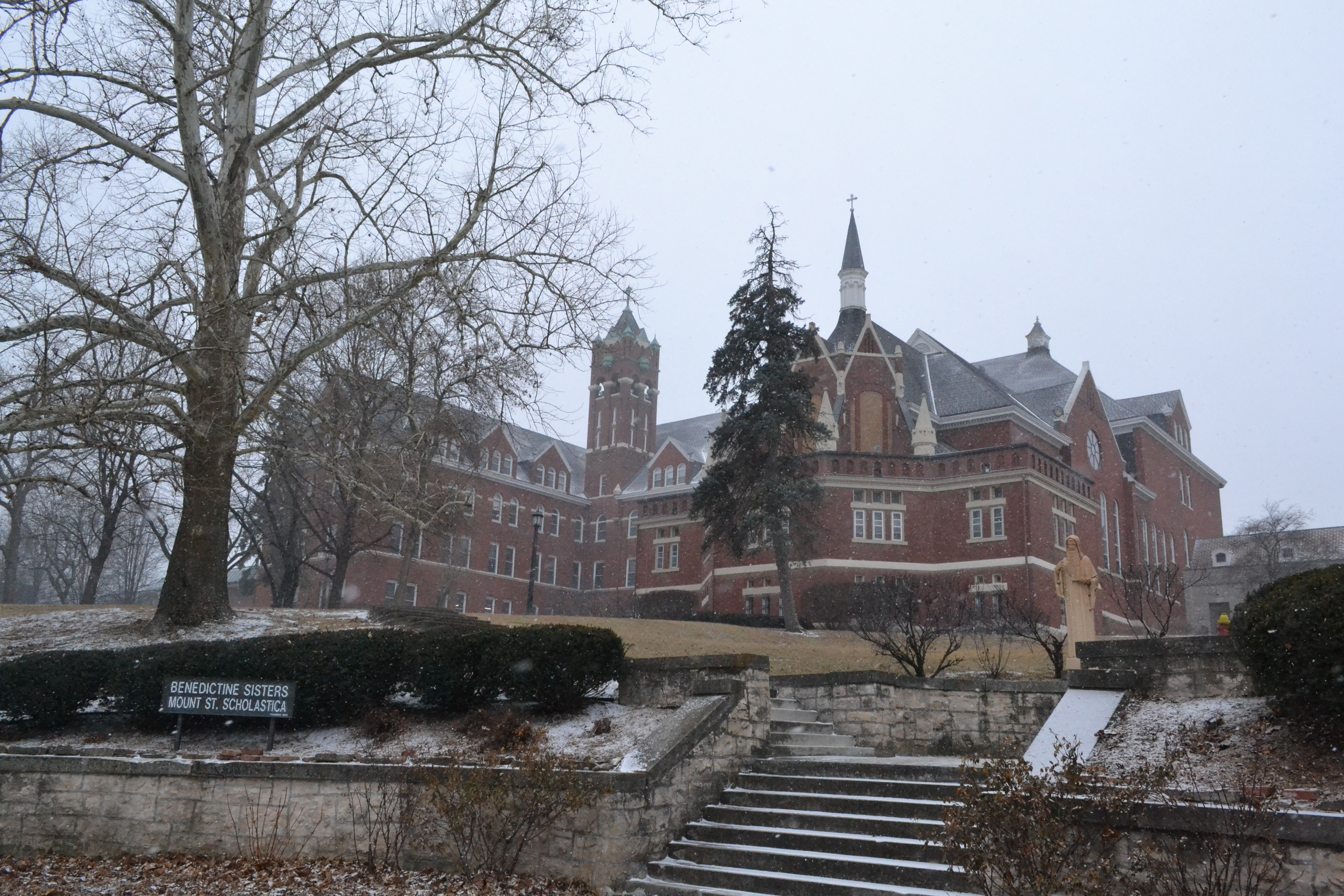
- Mount St. Scholastica in Atchison, Kansas
- Formation: November 11, 1863; 162 years ago
- Type: Catholic religious order
- Headquarters: Atchison, Kansas, U.S.
- Website: https://www.mountosb.org

The Benedictine Sisters of Mount St. Scholastica are an education-focused Benedictine religious community in Atchison, Kansas. The monastery founded Mount St.Scholastica College, a women's college which merged with St. Benedict's College in 1971, forming what is now Benedictine College.

== History ==
On November 11, 1863, Mother Evangelista Kremmeter and six other Benedictine sisters from the Sisters of St. Joseph in St. Cloud, Minnesota, arrived in Atchison by ferry at the request of Father Augustine Wirth. They took up lodging beside Atchison's Benedictine monks, who had established a monastery in the town in 1856 and had built a small convent for the sisters. In April 1865, two more sisters joined the group, arriving after being delayed in Hannibal, Missouri by Abraham Lincoln's funeral procession.

In 1877, the sisters, then numbered 28, moved to their current site after purchasing Price Villa at public auction, which they renamed St. Cecilia’s. The new location on 28 acres of land in South Atchison housed both the academy and the monastery. In the next decade, the sisters continued outreach in Kansas, as well as the states of Colorado, Iowa, Missouri, and Nebraska.

The monastery took in eight French sisters between 1904 and 1906, who had fled France due to the anti-Catholic policies of the Emile Combes-led Third Republic. By 1912, the community was home to about 300 nuns.

In 1963, the sisters built a convent in Kansas City, across the street from Lillis High School, which they helped run. Following the school's closure in 1979, they continued to use the convent, which as of 2013 was called the Peace House and was the residence of five sisters. The school building was rented out from 1971 to 1991, when it was purchased from the sisters.

The Benedictine Sisters of Mount St. Scholastica has had four daughterhouses, three of which are now independent. Former daughter houses were in Monasterio de San Benito, Mexico City (established 1944, became independent 1950), St. Lucy’s Priory, Glendora, California (established 1952, became independent 1956) and Benet Hill Priory, Colorado Springs (established 1960, became independent by 1965). Their only current dependent priory is Mosteiro Santa Maria Mãe de Deus in Mineiros, Goias, Brazil, which was established in 1964.

In 2009, the Benedictine Sisters of the Red Plains Monastery in Piedmont, Oklahoma joined the sisters at Mount St. Scholastica.

In 2010, the monastery undertook renovations on St. Cecilia's, making it into housing for guests. As of 2019, 111 sisters lived at Mount St. Scholastica, and the community had "three times as many lay associates".

== Schools ==
On December 1, 1863, they opened St. Scholastica’s Academy, a girls' school which served 44 students. In 1924, they established Mount St. Scholastica Junior College, which in 1934 received full accreditation from North Central Association. The sisters have remained involved with Benedictine College following the merger of Mount St. Scholastica College. Since 1980, they have participated in a prayer partner program, which matches sisters with Benedictine College students.

In 1949, the sisters opened Donnelly College in Kansas City, Kansas.

In addition to St. Scholastica's, the sisters were involved in the operation of multiple other schools over the years. By 1912, 148 sisters were teaching in 31 parochial schools. In 1962, sisters were working in 18 high school and 54 grade schools. Some of the schools served by the Benedictine Sisters of Mount St. Scholastica have included:

- Our Lady of Sorrows Parish school, Kansas City, Missouri (January 1891-1899)
- Immaculate Conception School, Higginsville, Missouri (1897-1899)
- Guardian Angels School, Kansas City (1910-1990)
- St. Patrick’s Parish school, Maryville, Missouri (1910-1959)
- St. Mary’s Parish school, Maryville (1911-1959)
- St. James School, St. Joseph, Missouri (1914-1998)
- Immaculate Conception parish school, Montrose, Missouri (1917-1970)
- St. Benedict’s Parish school, Clyde, Kansas (1920-1950)
- St. Joseph Cathedral School (1920-1987)
- Lillis High School, Kansas City (1941-1979)
- St. Ludger’s Parish School, Germantown, Missouri (1944-1959)
- Bishop LeBlond High School, St. Joseph (1962-1994)
- St. Bernadette’s School (1962-1986)
- St. Gregory Barbarigo Parish grade school, Maryville (1963-1992)

== Activism ==
In 2003, the sisters opened the Keeler Women's Center, which hosts support groups and offers classes to members of the Kansas City community.

Since the late 2010s, the sisters have sent several sisters and oblate volunteers to the Mexican-American border to work with migrants through Catholic Charities-affiliated organizations.

In May 2024, the sisters criticized the remarks of football player Harrison Butker during his address at the Benedictine College commencement ceremony. In their released statement, the sisters said the remarks "fostered division" and "do not...represent the Catholic, Benedictine, liberal arts college that our founders envisioned and in which we have been so invested". They also specifically drew attention to "the assertion that being a homemaker is the highest calling for a woman," noting that the women the group has taught over the years "have made a tremendous difference in the world in their roles as wives and mothers and through their God-given talents in leadership, scholarship and their careers".
