= Frederick W. Stein House =

Historic house in Kansas, United States

- U.S. National Register of Historic Places
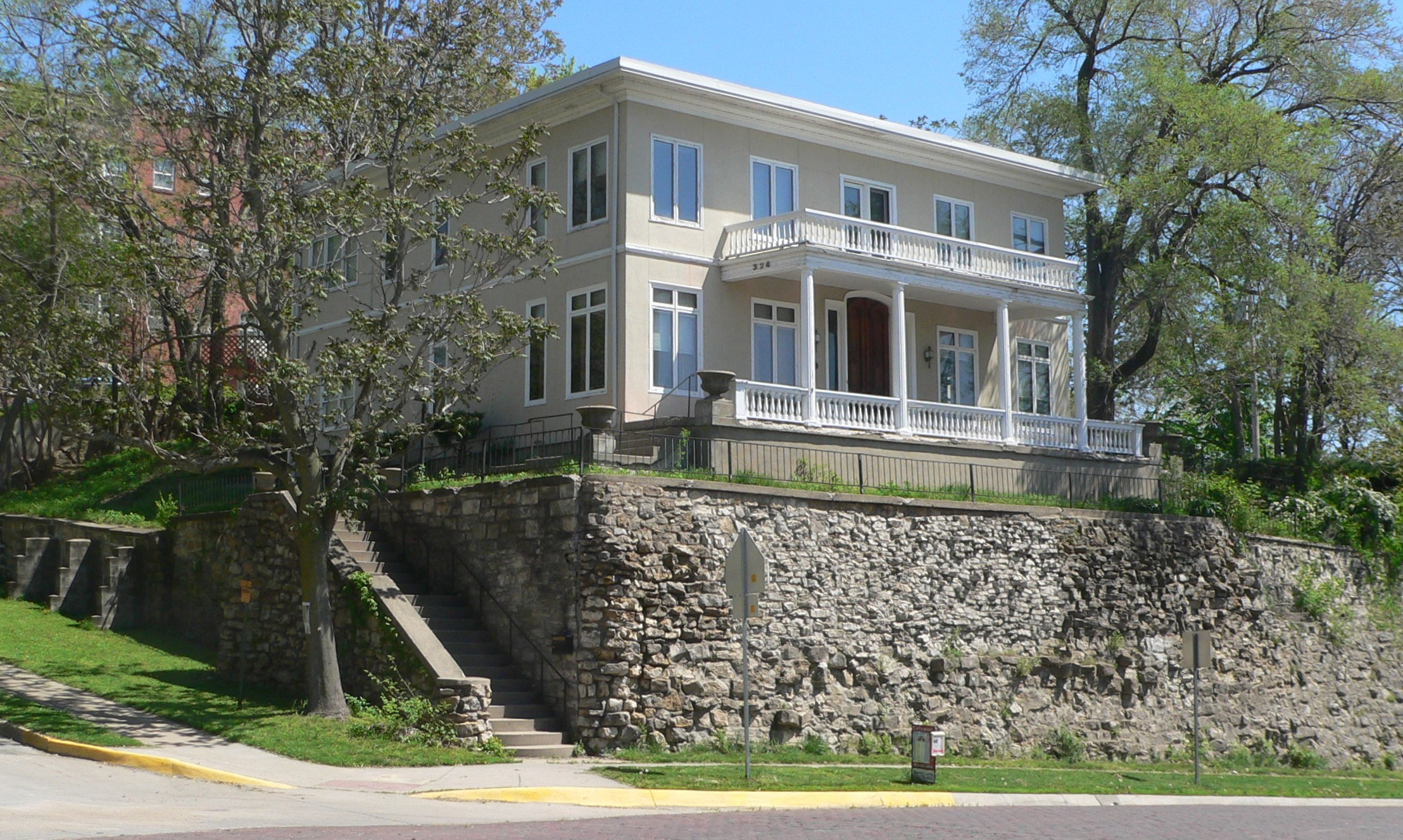
- The Frederick W. Stein House in 2015

- Location within Kansas
- Location: 324 Santa Fe, Atchison, Kansas
- Coordinates: 39°33′51″N 95°07′00″W
- Area: less than one acre
- Built: 1948
- Architect: George J. Davidson & G. Alden Krider
- Architectural style: Classical Revival
- NRHP reference No.: 03001391
- Added to NRHP: January 14, 2004

The Frederick W. Stein House is a historic house in Atchison, Kansas. It was built in 1948 for Frederick W. Stein, the founder and president of the Steinlite Corporation, and his wife, née Helen Moore. Stein's company sold the Steinlite Moisture Tester. By the late 1940s, Stein served as Atchison's mayor.

The house was designed by George J. Davidson and G. Alden Krider in the Classical Revival architectural style. It has been listed on the National Register of Historic Places since January 14, 2004.
