= St. Patrick's Catholic Church (Atchison, Kansas) =

Historic church in Kansas, United States

- U.S. National Register of Historic Places
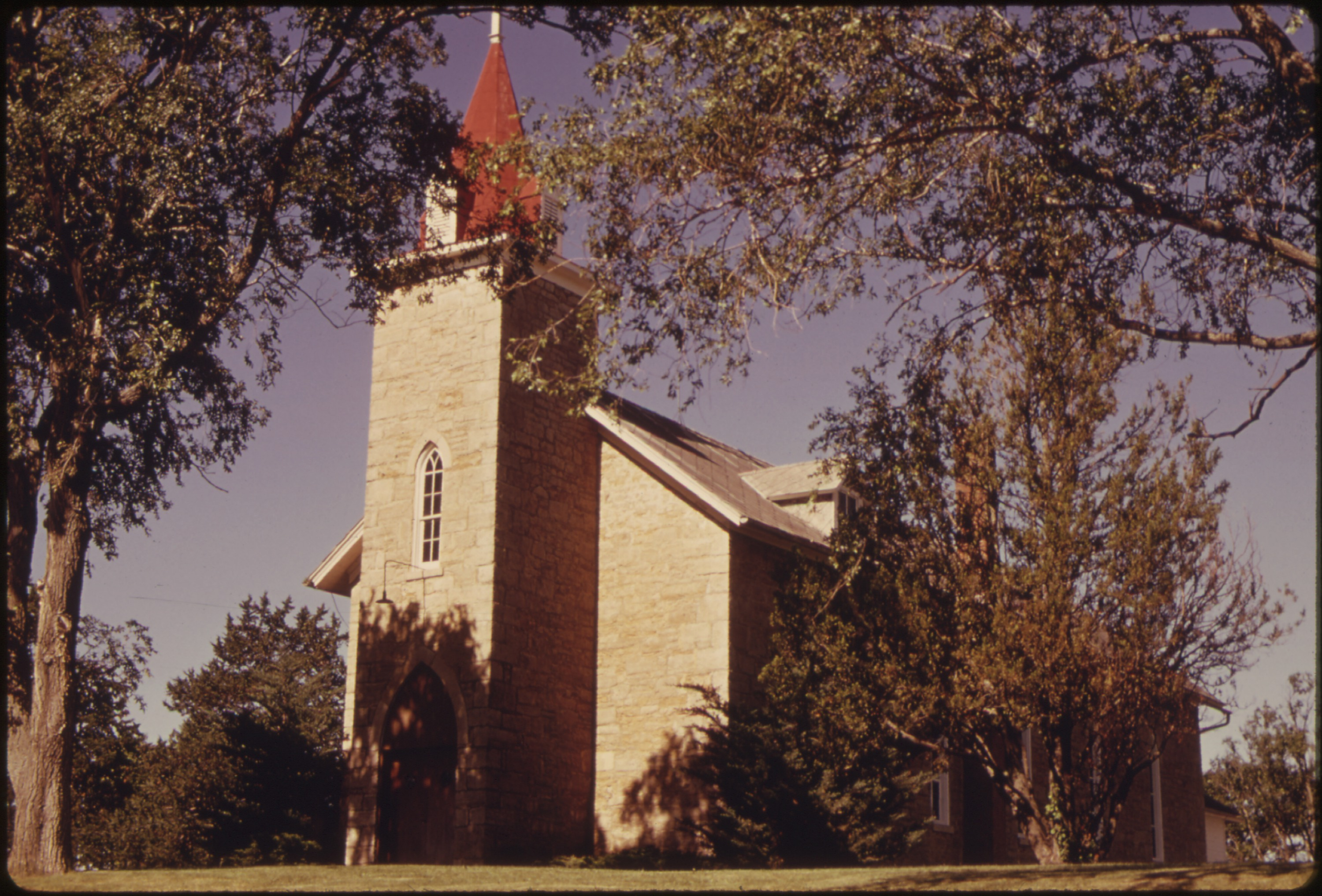
- St. Patrick's Catholic Church in 1974

- Location within Kansas Location within the United States
- Nearest city: Atchison, Kansas
- Coordinates: 39°28′10″N 95°7′17″W
- Area: Less than one acre
- Built: 1866
- Architects: McCourt, Edward; Wallace, Thomas
- Architectural style: Gothic
- NRHP reference No.: 98001358
- Added to NRHP: November 25, 1998

St. Patrick's Catholic Church is a historic Roman Catholic church in Atchison, Kansas. The stone church was built in 1866 and listed on the National Register of Historic Places in 1998.

It was described as "an example of the gable front, one-story, one-room native limestone building that stands in almost every county in Kansas."
